= Kamakhya–Arrah Junction Capital Express =

Train in the East Central Railway zone, India

Kamakhya - Ara Capital Express

Overview
- Service type: Express
- Locale: Assam, West Bengal, Bihar
- Current operator: East Central Railway zone

Route
- Termini: Ara Junction; Kamakhya
- Stops: 28
- Distance travelled: 949 km (590 mi)
- Average journey time: 22h 45m
- Service frequency: Four days (Note: Runs four days in a week for every direction.)
- Train number: 13247/13248
- Lines used: New Jalpaiguri–Alipurduar–Samuktala Road line; Katihar–Siliguri line; Barauni–Guwahati line; Barauni–Katihar line; New Delhi–Howrah main line

On-board services
- Classes: AC First, AC 2 tier, AC 3 tier, AC 3 Tier Economy, Sleeper class, General Unreserved
- Seating arrangements: No
- Sleeping arrangements: Yes
- Catering facilities: On-board catering E-catering
- Observation facilities: LHB coach
- Entertainment facilities: No
- Baggage facilities: Below the seats

Technical
- Rolling stock: 2
- Track gauge: 1,676 mm (5 ft 6 in)
- Operating speed: 42 km/h (26 mph), including halts

The Kamakhya–Ara Junction Capital Express is an Capital Express set of train belonging to East Central Railway zone that runs between Kamakhya Junction, Assam and Ara Junction, Bihar in India. It is currently operated with 13247/13248 train numbers four days per week.

== Service ==
The 13247/Capital Express has an average speed of 42 km/h and covers 949 km in 22h 45m. The 13248/Capital Express has an average speed of 40 km/h and covers 949 km in 24h.

== Routes and halts ==
Routes and halts of Kamakhya - Arrah Capital Express:
13247 KYQ → ARA	13248 ARA → KYQ
Kamakhya Junction	Arrah Junction
Goalpara	Danapur
New Bongaigaon	Patna Junction
Alipurduar Junction	Rajendra Nagar Terminal
Hasimara	Patna Sahib
Binnaguri	Banka Ghat
New Mal Junction	Fatuha Junction
Siliguri Junction	Bakhtiyarpur Junction
Bagdogra	Barh
Galgalia	Barauni Junction
Thakurganj	Begusarai
Kishanganj	Mansi Junction
Barsoi Junction	Naugachia
Dalkhola	Katihar
Katihar	Dalkhola
Naugachia	Kishanganj
Mansi Junction	Aluabari Road
Begusarai	Thakurganj
Barauni Junction	Galgalia
Barh	Bagdogra
Bakhtiyarpur Junction	Siliguri Junction
Fatuha Junction	New Mal Junction
Banka Ghat	Binnaguri
Patna Sahib	Hasimara
Rajendra Nagar Terminal	Alipurduar Junction
Patna Junction	New Bongaigaon
Danapur	Goalpara
Arrah Junction	Kamakhya Junction

== Coach composition ==
The train has standard LHB rakes with a maximum speed of 130 km/h. The train consists of 21 coaches:

- 1 AC First-class
- 2 AC II Tier
- 3 AC III Tier
- 7 Sleeper coaches
- 6 General
- 2 Seating cum Luggage Rake

== Traction ==
From Kamakhya to Arrah Junction, the train is hauled by an Gomoh Loco Shed or Siliguri Loco Shed -based WAP-7 locomotive and vice versa.

== Reversal ==
The train reverses direction in Siliguri Junction.

== Rake sharing ==
Train shares its rake with 13245/13246 New Jalpaiguri-Arrah Junction Capital Express.

== See also ==
- New Jalpaiguri-Rajendra Nagar Capital Express
- Rajendra Nagar Terminal railway station
- Guwahati Junction railway station
- Indore–Guwahati Weekly Express
- Capital Express
