= New Jalpaiguri–Arrah Junction Capital Express =

Train in India

New Jalpaiguri-Ara Junction Capital Express

Overview
- Service type: Express
- Locale: Bihar & West Bengal.
- Current operator: East Central Railway

Route
- Termini: Ara Junction; New Jalpaiguri (NJP)
- Stops: 32
- Distance travelled: 490 km (304 mi)
- Average journey time: 13 hours 10 minutes
- Service frequency: 3 days a week
- Train number: 13245 / 13246
- Lines used: Katihar–Siliguri line; Barauni–Guwahati line; Barauni–Katihar section; New Delhi–Howrah main line

On-board services
- Classes: AC First Class (H), AC 2 Tier (A), AC 3 Tier (B), AC 3 Tier Economy (M), Sleeper class (SL), General Unreserved (UR)
- Seating arrangements: Yes
- Sleeping arrangements: Yes
- Catering facilities: E-catering
- Observation facilities: Large windows
- Baggage facilities: Available
- Other facilities: Below the seats

Technical
- Rolling stock: LHB coach
- Track gauge: Broad gauge
- Operating speed: 39 km/h (24 mph) average including halts.
Route map
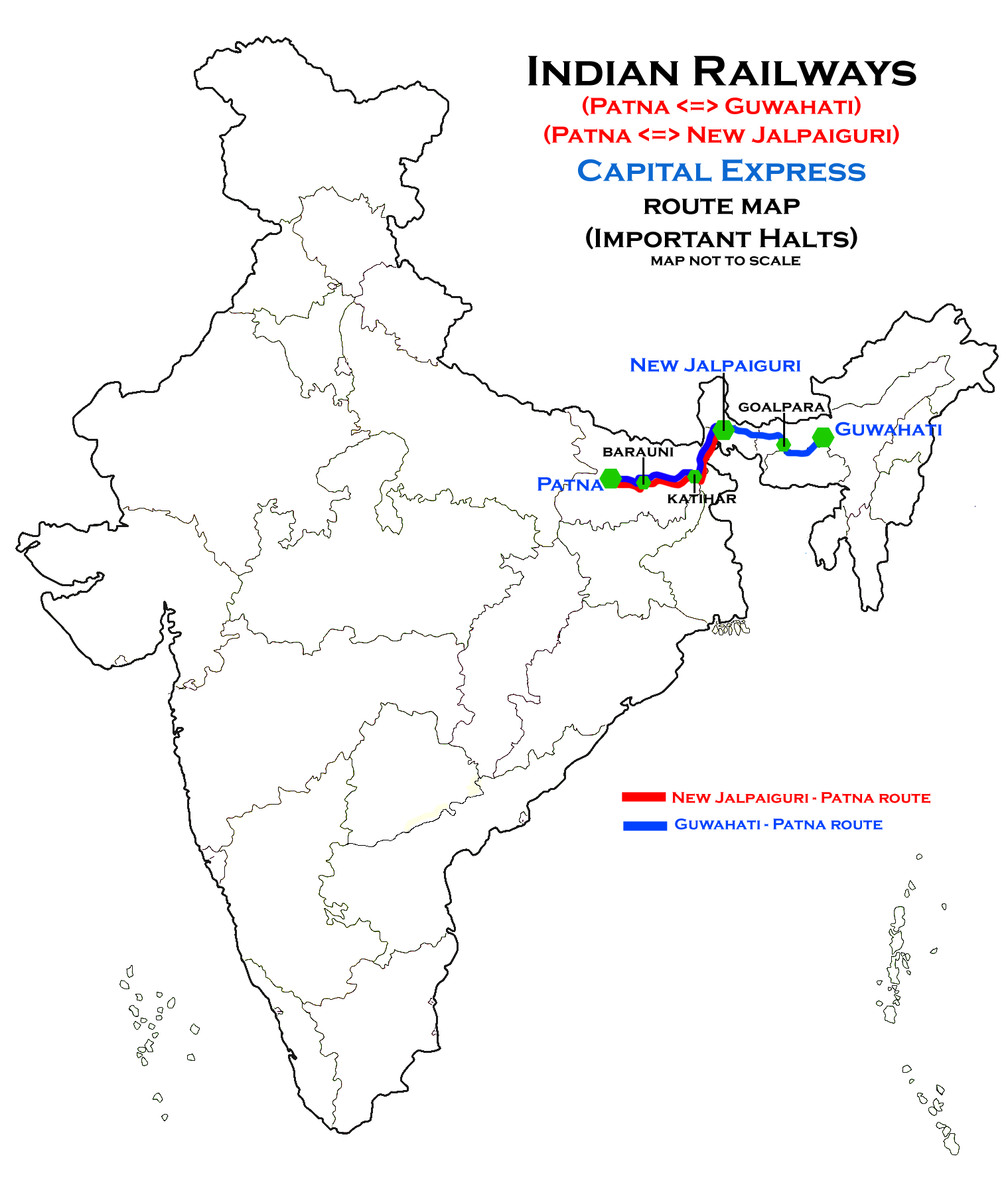
- New Jalpaiguri–Rajendra Nagar Capital Express map

The 13245 / 13246 New Jalpaiguri–-Ara Junction Capital Express is the Capital Express set of train belonging to East Central Railway zone that runs between New Jalpaiguri Junction Siliguri, West Bengal and Ara Junction, Bihar in India. It is operated with 13245/46 train numbers on three days each week.

== Coach composition ==
The train has LHB coach. The train consists of 23 coaches:

- 1 AC First (1AC) (H1)
- 2 AC II Tier (2AC) (A1–A2)
- 4 AC III Tier (3AC) (B1–B4)
- 1 AC III Economy (3E) (M1)
- 8 Sleeper coaches (SL) (S1–S8)
- 3 General (UR)
- 2 EOG rake (EOG)

== Routes and halts ==
Routes and halts of New Jalpaiguri–Arrah Express :
13245 NJP → ARA	13246 ARA → NJP
New Jalpaiguri Junction	Arrah Junction
Siliguri Junction	Danapur
Bagdogra	Patna Junction
Galgalia	Rajendra Nagar Terminal
Thakurganj	
Kishanganj	Patna Sahib
Barsoi Junction	Banka Ghat
Dalkhola	Fatuha Junction
Katihar	Bakhtiyarpur Junction
Naugachia	Barh
Mansi Junction	Barauni Junction
Begusarai	Begusarai
Barauni Junction	Mansi Junction
Barh	Naugachia
Bakhtiyarpur Junction	Katihar
Fatuha Junction	Dalkhola
Banka Ghat	Kishanganj
Rajendra Nagar Terminal	Aluabari Road Junction
Patna Sahib	Thakurganj
Patna Junction	Galgalia
Danapur	Bagdogra
Arrah Junction	Siliguri Junction
	New Jalpaiguri Junction

== Traction ==
From New Jalpaiguri to Arrah Junction the train is hauled by an Electric Loco Shed, Gomoh or Diesel Loco Shed, Siliguri -based WAP-7 locomotive and vice versa.

== Rake sharing ==
- 13245 / 13246 New Jalpaiguri–Rajendra Nagar Terminal Capital Express shares its rake with 13247 / 13248 Kamakhya–Arrah Junction Capital Express.
