= Capital Express (India) =

Train in India

Overview
- Service type: Express
- Locale: Bihar, West Bengal & Assam
- Current operator: East Central Railway

Route
- Termini: Ara Junction (ARA); Kamakhya Junction (KYQ) New Jalpaiguri Junction (NJP)
- Stops: 42
- Distance travelled: 953 km (592 mi)
- Average journey time: 22 hours 10 minutes
- Service frequency: 4 days a week (13247/48); 3 days a week (13245/46)
- Train number: 13247 / 13248 / 13245/ 13246

On-board services
- Classes: AC 2 Tier, AC 3 Tier, Sleeper Class, General Unreserved
- Seating arrangements: Yes
- Sleeping arrangements: Yes
- Catering facilities: E-catering
- Observation facilities: Large windows
- Baggage facilities: Available
- Other facilities: Below the seats

Technical
- Rolling stock: LHB coach
- Track gauge: Broad Gauge
- Operating speed: 43 km/h (27 mph) average including halts.
Route map
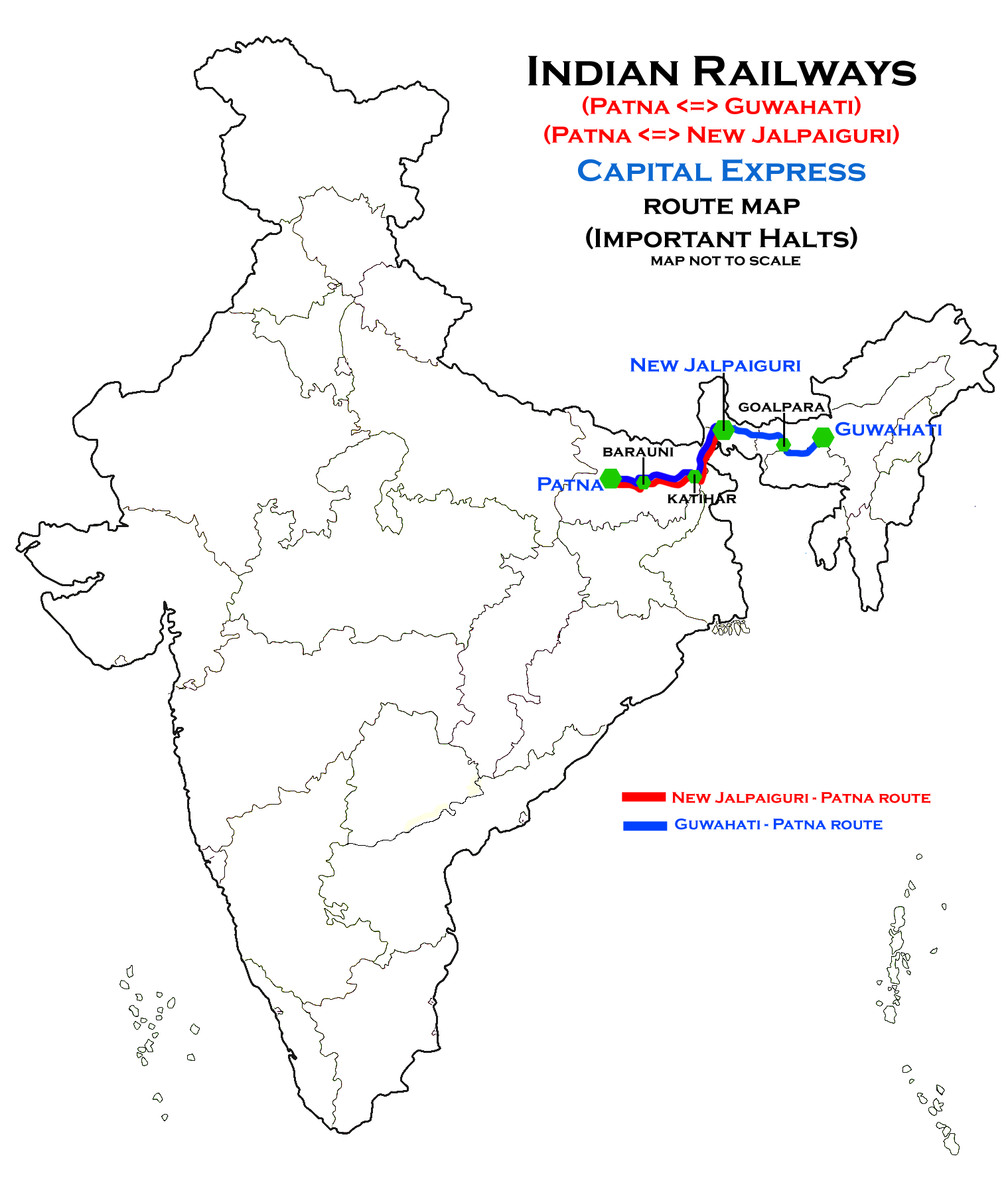
- Kamakhya-Rajendra Nagar Capital Express map

The 13247 / 13248 Kamakhya–Arrah Junction Capital Express and 13245/13246 New Jalpaiguri-Arrah Junction Capital Express are the set of Capital express train belonging to East Central Railway zone that runs between Kamakhya Junction, New Jalpaiguri Junction and Ara Junction in India.

== Service ==
The 13245/46 Capital Express has average speed of 35 km/h and covers 490 km in 14h. The 13247/48 Capital Express has average speed of 39 km/h and covers 942 km in 24h.

== Halts ==
Routes and halts of New Jalpaiguri - Arrah Express :
13245 NJP → ARA	13246 ARA → NJP
New Jalpaiguri Junction	Arrah Junction
Siliguri Junction	Danapur
Bagdogra	Patna Junction
Galgalia	Rajendra Nagar Terminal
Thakurganj	
Kishanganj	Patna Sahib
Barsoi Junction	Banka Ghat
Dalkhola	Fatuha Junction
Katihar	Bakhtiyarpur Junction
Naugachia	Barh
Mansi Junction	Barauni Junction
Begusarai	Begusarai
Barauni Junction	Mansi Junction
Barh	Naugachia
Bakhtiyarpur Junction	Katihar
Fatuha Junction	Dalkhola
Banka Ghat	Kishanganj
Rajendra Nagar Terminal	Aluabari Road
Patna Sahib	Thakurganj
Patna Junction	Galgalia
Danapur	Bagdogra
Arrah Junction	Siliguri Junction
	New Jalpaiguri Junction

Routes and halts of Kamakhya - Arrah Capital Express :
13247 KYQ → ARA	13248 ARA → KYQ
Kamakhya Junction	Arrah Junction
Goalpara	Danapur
New Bongaigaon	Patna Junction
Alipurduar Junction	Rajendra Nagar Terminal
Hasimara	Patna Sahib
Binnaguri	Banka Ghat
New Mal Junction	Fatuha Junction
Siliguri Junction	Bakhtiyarpur Junction
Bagdogra	Barh
Galgalia	Barauni Junction
Thakurganj	Begusarai
Kishanganj	Mansi Junction
Barsoi Junction	Naugachia
Dalkhola	Katihar
Katihar	Dalkhola
Naugachia	Kishanganj
Mansi Junction	Aluabari Road
Begusarai	Thakurganj
Barauni Junction	Galgalia
Barh	Bagdogra
Bakhtiyarpur Junction	Siliguri Junction
Fatuha Junction	New Mal Junction
Banka Ghat	Binnaguri
Patna Sahib	Hasimara
Rajendra Nagar Terminal	Alipurduar Junction
Patna Junction	New Bongaigaon
Danapur	Goalpara
Arrah Junction	Kamakhya Junction

== Coach composition ==
Both trains has LHB coach. The train consists of 22 coaches:

- 1 AC First Cum 2 Ac-class
- 4 AC II Tier
- 4 AC III Tier
- 8 Sleeper Coaches
- 3 General
- 2 EOG Rake

== Traction ==
Both Capital Express are hauled by a Samastipur Loco Shed / Siliguri Loco Shed / Gomoh Loco Shed-based WAP-7 electric locomotive on its entire journey.

== Reversal ==
13247/48 train reverses direction at Siliguri Junction.

13245/46 train has no reversals.

== Rake sharing ==
- 13245 / 13246 New Jalpaiguri-Arrah Junction Capital Express shares its rake with 13247 / 13248 Kamakhya–Arrah Junction Capital Express and vice versa.

== See also ==
- Rajendra Nagar Terminal railway station
- New Jalpaiguri Junction railway station
- Indore–Guwahati Weekly Express
- Guwahati–Rajendra Nagar Capital Express
