= New Jalpaiguri–Ranchi Weekly Express =

Train belonging to Indian Railways

New Jalpaiguri - Ranchi Express
Overview
- Service type: Express
- First service: 13 February 2015; 11 years ago
- Current operator: South Eastern Railway zone

Route
- Termini: Ranchi Junction (RNC); New Jalpaiguri (NJP)
- Stops: 19
- Distance travelled: 839 km (521 mi)
- Average journey time: 22 hours 05 mins
- Service frequency: Weekly
- Train number: 18630/18629

On-board services
- Classes: AC 2 Tier, AC 3 Tier, Sleeper 3 Tier, Unreserved
- Seating arrangements: Yes
- Sleeping arrangements: Yes
- Catering facilities: Yes
- Observation facilities: LHB coach
- Entertainment facilities: No
- Baggage facilities: Available

Technical
- Rolling stock: 2
- Track gauge: 1,676 mm (5 ft 6 in)
- Operating speed: 37 km/h (23 mph)

New Jalpaiguri–Ranchi Weekly Express is an Express train of the Indian Railways connecting Ranchi Junction in Jharkhand and New Jalpaiguri in Siliguri, West Bengal. It is currently being operated with 18630/18629 train numbers on twice in week basis. The train passes through Jharkhand, Bihar, and West Bengal.

== Timings ==
The train starts from Platform Number 01 of Ranchi at 05:45 on every Thursday and reaches Platform Number 1/4/2 of New Jalpaiguri at 04:00 on Friday.

The train starts from Platform Number 1/4/2 of New Jalpaiguri at 05:25 every Friday and reaches Platform Number 02 Ranchi at 03:30 on Saturday.

The train covers total distance of 829 kilometres in 22 hours 15 minutes.

== Locomotive ==
The train is hauled by WAP-5 /WAP-7 locomotive of Electric Loco Shed, Asansol for the entire journey and vice versa.

== Coach composition ==
The train contains 6 General Coaches, 1 AC Second Tier, 3 AC Third Tier, 6 Sleeper Coaches and 2 Second Sitting Coaches.

== Route ==
1. New Jalpaiguri (Starts)
2. Siliguri Junction
3. Thakurganj
4. Aluabari Road Junction
5. Kishanganj
6. Barsoi Junction
7. Katihar
8. Naugachia
9. Khagaria Junction
10. Begusarai
11. Barauni Junction
12. Kiul Junction
13. Jhajha
14. Jasidih Junction
15. Madhupur Junction
16. Chittaranjan
17. Dhanbad Junction
18. Chandrapura
19. Bokaro Steel City
20. Muri Junction
21. Ranchi Junction (Ends)

== Loco reversal ==
The train reverses its direction in Barauni Junction.

== See also ==
- Ranchi–Kamakhya Express
