= Kamakhya–Rohtak Amrit Bharat Express =

Amrit Bharat Express train route in India

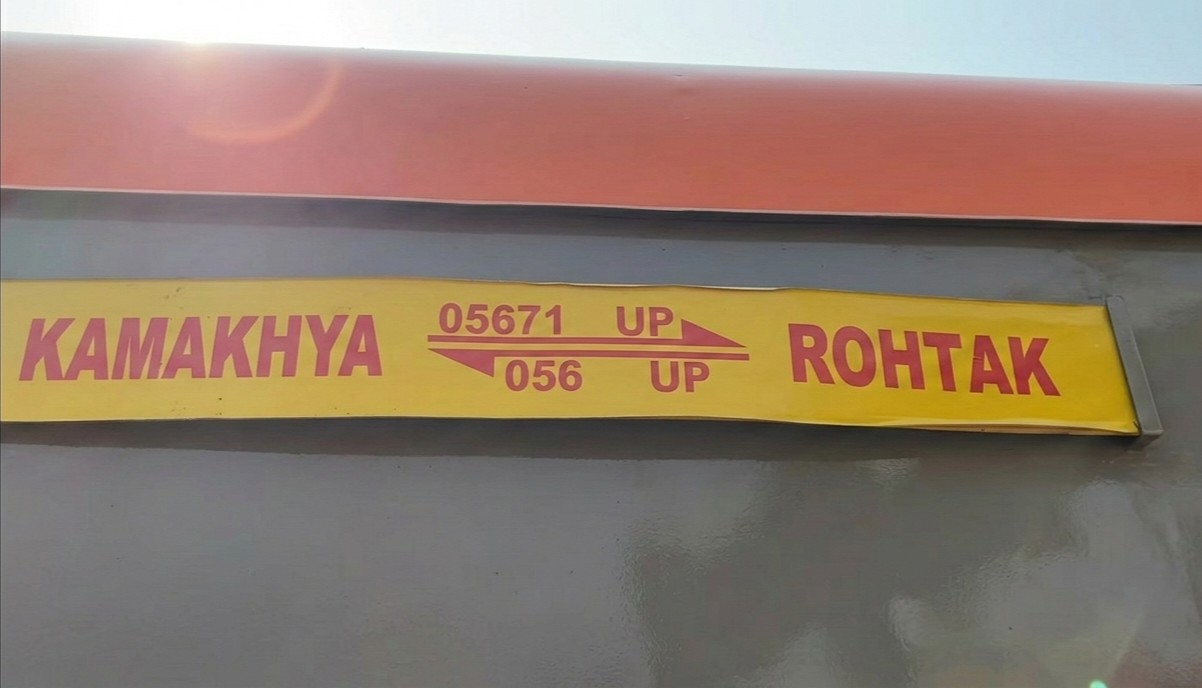

Overview
- Service type: Amrit Bharat Express, Superfast
- Status: Active
- Locale: Assam, West Bengal, Uttar Pradesh, Delhi, Bihar and Haryana
- First service: 18 January 2026 (Inaugural)
- Current operator: Northeast Frontier Railways (NFR)

Route
- Termini: Kamakhya (KYQ); Rohtak Junction (ROK)
- Stops: 30
- Distance travelled: 1,940 km (1,205 mi)
- Average journey time: 40 hrs 30 mins
- Service frequency: Weekly
- Train number: 15671/15672
- Lines used: Kamakhya –Rangiya–New Bongaigaon line; New Jalpaiguri–New Bongaigaon Line; New Jalpaiguri–Barauni line towards ( Kishanganj, Barsoi Junction, Katihar Junction ); Hajipur–Chhapra line; Varanasi–Prayagraj line; Kanpur–Delhi section Towards ( Ghaziabad Junction, Delhi Junction); Delhi–Rohtak line

On-board services
- Class: Sleeper class coach (SL) General unreserved coach (GS)
- Seating arrangements: Yes
- Sleeping arrangements: Yes
- Auto-rack arrangements: Upper
- Catering facilities: On-board catering
- Observation facilities: Saffron-grey
- Entertainment facilities: Electric outlets; Reading lights; Bottle holder
- Other facilities: CCTV cameras; Bio-vacuum toilets; Foot-operated water taps; Passenger information system

Technical
- Rolling stock: Modified LHB coaches
- Track gauge: Indian gauge
- Electrification: 25 kV 50 Hz AC overhead line
- Operating speed: 47 km (29 mi) (Avg.)
- Track owner: Indian Railways
- Rake sharing: No

The 15671/15672 Kamakhya–Rohtak Amrit Bharat Express is India's 20th non-AC Superfast Amrit Bharat Express train, which runs across the states of Assam, West Bengal, Bihar, Uttar Pradesh, New Delhi and Haryana by connecting the city of temples Kamakhya Junction with Rohtak Junction the heart city of Haryana.

The express train is inaugurated on 18 January 2026 by Honorable Prime Minister Narendra Modi through video conference.

== Overview ==
The train is operated by Indian Railways, connecting Kamakhya Junction and Rohtak Junction. It is currently operated with train numbers 15671/15672 on weekly basis.

== Schedule ==
Train Schedule: Kamakhya ↔ Rohtak Amrit Bharat Express
Train no.	Station code	Departure station	Departure time	Departure day	Arrival station	Arrival hours
15671	KYQ	Kamakhya	10:00 PM	2:45 PM	Rohtak Junction	40h 45m
15672	ROK	Rohtak Junction	10:10 PM	12:15 PM	Kamakhya	38h 5m

== Routes and halts ==
Routes and halts of Kamakhya–Rohtak Amrit Bharat Express :
15671 KYQ → ROK	15672 ROK → KYQ
Kamakhya Junction	Rohtak Junction
Rangiya Junction	Bahadurgarh
Barpeta Road	Delhi Junction
New Bongaigaon Junction	Ghaziabad Junction
Kokrajhar	Tundla Junction
New Cooch Behar	Govindpuri
New Jalpaiguri Junction	Prayagraj Junction
Kishanganj	Prayagraj Rambagh
Barsoi Junction	Gyanpur Road
Katihar Junction	Varanasi Junction
Naugachia	Aunrihar Junction
Mansi Junction	Ghazipur City
Khagaria Junction	Ballia
Begusarai	Chhapra Junction
Barauni Junction	Sonpur Junction
Hajipur Junction	Hajipur Junction
Sonpur Junction	Barauni Junction
Chhapra Junction	Begusarai
Ballia	Khagaria Junction
Ghazipur City	Mansi Junction
Aunrihar Junction	Naugachia
Varanasi Junction	Katihar Junction
Gyanpur Road	Barsoi Junction
Prayagraj Rambagh	Kishanganj
Prayagraj Junction	New Jalpaiguri Junction
Govindpuri	New Cooch Behar
Tundla Junction	Kokrajhar
Ghaziabad Junction	New Bongaigaon Junction
Delhi Junction	Barpeta Road
Bahadurgarh	Rangiya Junction
Rohtak Junction	Kamakhya Junction

== Rakes ==
It is the 20th Amrit Bharat 2.0 Express train in which the locomotives were designed by Chittaranjan Locomotive Works (CLW) at Chittaranjan, West Bengal and the coaches were designed and manufactured by the Integral Coach Factory at Perambur, Chennai under the Make in India initiative.

== Coach composition ==
Coach Composition
Category	Coaches	Total
SLRD (Divyangjan Coach)	SLRD, SLRD	2
General Unreserved (GEN)	GEN1, GEN2, GEN3, GEN4, GEN5, GEN6, GEN7	7
Sleeper class (SL)	S8, S7, S6, S5, S4, S3, S2, S1	8
Pantry car (PC)	PC	1
General Unreserved (GEN)	GEN8, GEN9, GEN10, GEN11, GEN12	5
SLRD (Divyangjan Coach)	SLRD	1
Total Coaches		22

== See also ==
- Amrit Bharat Express
- Vande Bharat Express
- Tejas Express
- Kamakhya
- Rohtak Junction

== Notes ==
a. Runs a day in a week with both directions.
