= North East Express =

Train in India

Overview
- Service type: Superfast Express
- Locale: Assam, West Bengal, Bihar, Uttar Pradesh & Delhi
- First service: 1 April 1986; 40 years ago
- Current operator: Northeast Frontier Railway

Route
- Termini: Kamakhya Junction (KYQ); Anand Vihar Terminal (ANVT)
- Stops: 28
- Distance travelled: 1,856 km (1,153 mi)
- Average journey time: 33 hours 18 minutes
- Service frequency: Daily
- Train number: 12505 / 12506

On-board services
- Classes: AC First Class, AC 2 Tier, AC 3 Tier, Sleeper Class, General Unreserved
- Seating arrangements: Yes
- Sleeping arrangements: Yes
- Catering facilities: Available
- Observation facilities: Large windows
- Baggage facilities: No
- Other facilities: Below the seats

Technical
- Rolling stock: LHB coach
- Track gauge: 1,676 mm (5 ft 6 in)
- Operating speed: 59 km/h (37 mph) average including halts.
Route map
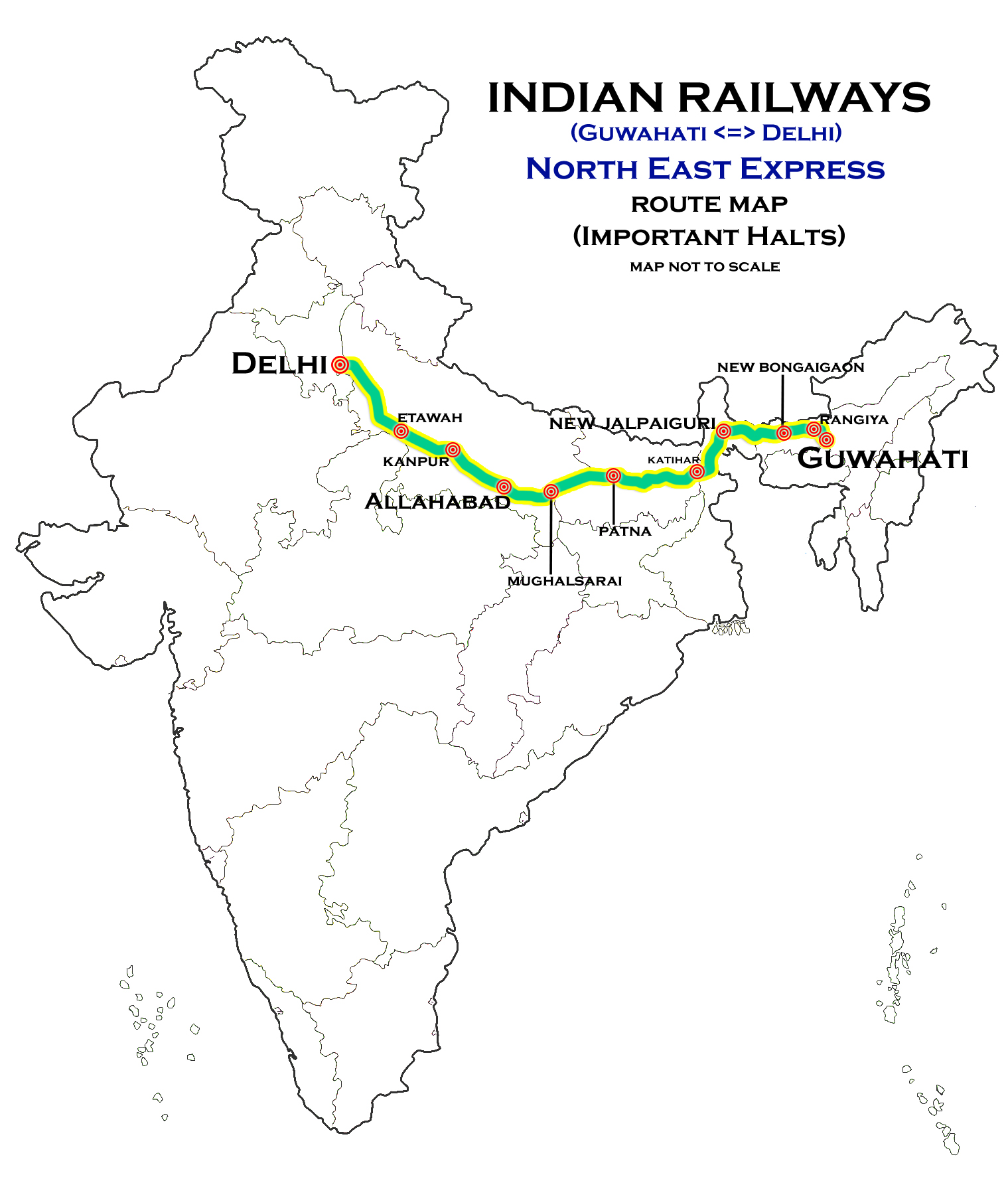

The 12505 / 12506 North East Express is a Daily express train of Indian Railways that runs between Kamakhya Junction in Guwahati, Assam and Anand Vihar Terminal near New Delhi, connecting northeastern India to New Delhi. The train belongs to the Northeast Frontier Railway zone of Indian Railways, while the coaches belong to the Kamakhya coaching depot of the Lumding railway division.

The North East Express succeeded the Assam Mail in 1986. The train runs along the Barauni–Guwahati line, Mokama–Barauni section, and the Howrah–Delhi main line.

== Service ==
The train is numbered as 12505/12506. Originally, the North East Express was not a Superfast Express (broad gauge trains with an average speed of at least 55 km/h) and used service numbers 921 and 922 when introduced in 1986. In 1988, the train was reassigned with 2521 and 2522, later replaced with 5621 and 5622. It used to run between Guwahati and New Delhi. In the railway budget of 2005–2006, it was sped up to the broad gauge Superfast category without the removal of any stops. The new numbers assigned in the Superfast category were 2505 from Guwahati and 2506 from New Delhi. With the new five-digit numbering scheme introduced during the tenure of Mamata Banerjee as railway minister, the service numbers were changed to 12505 and 12506. The train now starts from Kamakhya Junction railway station at Maligaon and runs up to Anand Vihar Terminal instead of Guwahati and New Delhi.

== Coaches ==
The train has air-conditioned as well as non-air-conditioned coaches. The composition of the train is 2A – 1 (A-1), 3A – 3 (B-1, B-2, B-3), SL – 14 (S-1 to S-14), PC – 1, GENL – 3 & SLR – 2. The total rake length is 24 coaches. New LHB rakes were introduced on 3 October 2019.

== Stations ==
=== Delhi to Guwahati ===
==== List of stops on the North East Express from Delhi to Guwahati ====
State	Town/City	Station	Distance (km)
Delhi	Delhi	Anand Vihar Terminal	0
Uttar Pradesh	Aligarh	Aligarh Junction	126
Uttar Pradesh	Tundla	Tundla Junction	204
Uttar Pradesh	Etawah	Etawah Junction	296
Uttar Pradesh	Kanpur	Kanpur Central	435
Uttar Pradesh	Fatehpur	Fatehpur	513
Uttar Pradesh	Prayagraj	Prayagraj Junction	629
Uttar Pradesh	Pandit Deen Dayal Upadhyaya Nagar	Pandit Deen Dayal Upadhyaya Junction	778
Bihar	Buxar	Buxar	872
Bihar	Arrah	Ara Junction	941
Bihar	Danapur	Danapur	980
Bihar	Patna	Patliputra Junction	986
Bihar	Barauni	Barauni Junction	1095
Bihar	Begusarai	Begusarai	1110
Bihar	Khagaria	Khagaria Junction	1150
Bihar	Mansi	Mansi Junction	1159
Bihar	Naugachia	Naugachia	1217
Bihar	Katihar	Katihar Junction	1274
Bihar	Barsoi	Barsoi Junction	1313
Bihar	Kishanganj	Kishanganj	1371
West Bengal	Siliguri	New Jalpaiguri Junction	1458
West Bengal	Jalpaiguri	Jalpaiguri Road	1491
West Bengal	Cooch Behar	New Cooch Behar Junction	1584
West Bengal	Alipurduar	New Alipurduar	1603
Assam	Gossaigaon	Gossaigaon Hat	1645
Assam	Kokrajhar	Kokrajhar	1681
Assam	Bongaigaon	New Bongaigaon Junction	1709
Assam	Bijni	Bijni	1724
Assam	Barpeta	Barpeta Road	1751
Assam	Rangia	Rangiya Junction	1819
Assam	Maligaon	Kamakhya Junction	1856

=== Guwahati to Delhi ===
==== List of stops on the North East Express from Guwahati to Delhi ====
State	Town/City	Station	Distance (km)
Assam	Maligaon	Kamakhya Junction	0
Assam	Rangia	Rangiya Junction	48
Assam	Barpeta	Barpeta Road	105
Assam	Bijni	Bijni	133
Assam	Bongaigaon	New Bongaigaon Junction	157
Assam	Kokrajhar	Kokrajhar	185
Assam	Gossaigaon	Gossaigaon Hat	210
West Bengal	Alipurduar	New Alipurduar	264
West Bengal	Cooch Behar	New Cooch Behar Junction	283
West Bengal	Jalpaiguri	Jalpaiguri Road	375
West Bengal	Siliguri	New Jalpaiguri Junction	409
Bihar	Kishanganj	Kishanganj	496
Bihar	Barsoi	Barsoi Junction	553
Bihar	Katihar	Katihar Junction	593
Bihar	Naugachia	Naugachia	650
Bihar	Mansi	Mansi Junction	708
Bihar	Khagaria	Khagaria Junction	716
Bihar	Begusarai	Begusarai	757
Bihar	Barauni	Barauni Junction	772
Bihar	Patna	Patliputra Junction	880
Bihar	Danapur	Danapur	886
Bihar	Arrah	Ara Junction	926
Bihar	Buxar	Buxar	994
Uttar Pradesh	Pandit Deen Dayal Upadhyaya Nagar	Pandit Deen Dayal Upadhyaya Junction	1088
Uttar Pradesh	Prayagraj	Prayagraj Junction	1237
Uttar Pradesh	Fatehpur	Fatehpur	1354
Uttar Pradesh	Kanpur	Kanpur Central	1432
Uttar Pradesh	Etawah	Etawah Junction	1571
Uttar Pradesh	Tundla	Tundla Junction	1663
Uttar Pradesh	Aligarh	Aligarh Junction	1741
Uttar Pradesh	Ghaziabad	Ghaziabad Junction	1844
Delhi	Delhi	Anand Vihar Terminal	1856

== Traction ==
It is hauled by a Ghaziabad Loco Shed-based WAP-7 electric locomotive from end to end.

== Accidents and incidents ==
On 11 October 2023 at 21:35 IST, 23 coaches of the eastbound 12506 train derailed near Raghunathpur Railway Station in the Buxar district of Bihar. Five people were killed in the crash and more than 70 others were injured. The East Central Railway zone facilitated relief trains to ferry the remaining passengers to their destination. A preliminary investigation report cited an issue with the track.
