= Sikkim Mahananda Express =

Train in India

Overview
- Service type: Express
- Locale: West Bengal, Bihar, Uttar Pradesh & Delhi
- First service: 5 May 1989; 37 years ago
- Current operator: Northeast Frontier Railway

Route
- Termini: Alipurduar (APDJ); Old Delhi (DLI)
- Stops: 61
- Distance travelled: 1,669 km (1,037 mi)
- Average journey time: 37 hrs 15 mins
- Service frequency: Daily
- Train number: 15483 / 15484

On-board services
- Classes: AC First Class, AC 2 Tier, AC 3 Tier, AC 3 Tier economy, Sleeper Class, General Unreserved
- Seating arrangements: Yes
- Sleeping arrangements: Yes
- Auto-rack arrangements: No
- Catering facilities: Available
- Observation facilities: Large windows
- Baggage facilities: Available
- Other facilities: Below the seats

Technical
- Rolling stock: LHB coach
- Track gauge: 1,676 mm (5 ft 6 in) broad gauge
- Operating speed: 44.8 km/h (28 mph) average including halts.
Route map
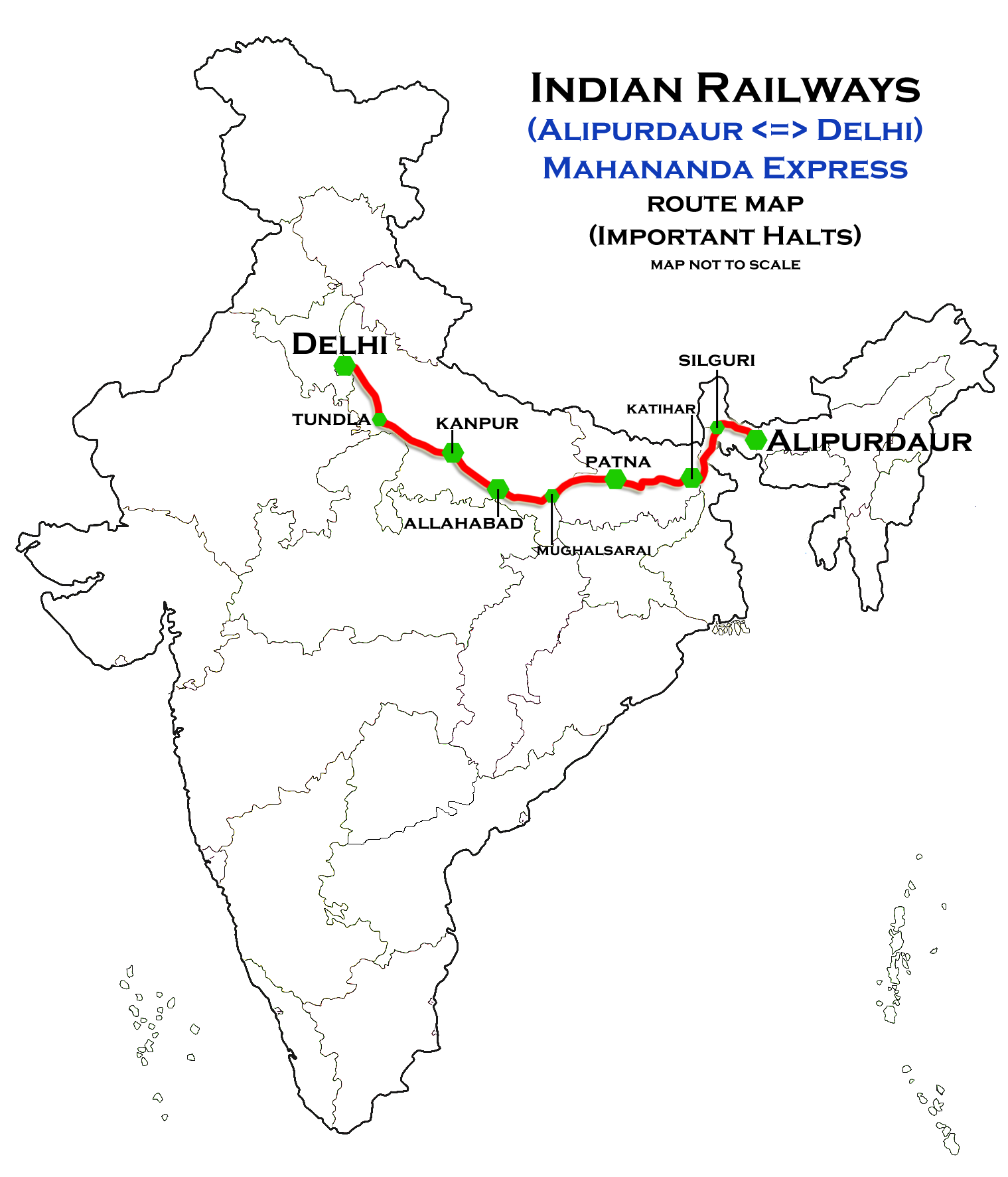

The 15483 / 15484 Sikkim Mahananda Express is an express train connecting the cities of Delhi and Alipurduar. This is a direct train origination from Old Delhi to Alipurduar Junction. The train connects the Eastern and Northern regions, as well as parts of India in the Bihar & Uttar Pradesh areas.

The name of the train is derived from the Mahananda River, which runs through North Bengal, Eastern Bihar and Bangladesh.

As the entire route is not electrified, the train runs with both an electric and diesel locomotive. Usually the train gets a WDP-4/WDP-4B from the Siliguri Diesel Loco Shed for the non-electrified territory and a WAP-4 electric locomotive in the electrified section. Now this train is hauled by WAP-7 locomotive from start to end of journey.

On 16 February 2026, the Sikkim Mahananda Express was flagged off from Sivok railway station in Sevoke townfor the first time, marking the station’s first long-distance express service.

The extension is expected to improve direct rail connectivity between the Darjeeling–Dooars region of North Bengal and Delhi via Alipurduar.

== History ==
The train when introduced used to run from Katihar Junction to Delhi as train number(s) 983/984. This train was later extended to New Jalpaiguri with train number(s) 4083/4084. Finally the train was extended to Alipurduar Junction.

== Route and halts ==
The important stops of this train are;

1. Delhi Junction
2. Ghaziabad Junction
3. Aligarh Junction
4. Tundla Junction
5. Kanpur Central
6. Prayagraj Junction
7. Pt. Deen Dayal Upadhyaya Junction
8. Buxar
9. Ara Junction
10. Patna Junction
11. Bakhtiyarpur Junction
12. Mokama
13. New Barauni Junction
14. Begusarai
15. Khagaria Junction
16. Mansi Junction
17. Naugachia
18. Katihar Junction
19. Azamnagar Road
20. Barsoi Junction
21. Dalkhola
22. Kishanganj
23. Aluabari Road Junction
24. Thakurganj
25. Galgalia
26. Naxalbari
27. Bagdogra
28. Siliguri Junction (Loco reversal)
29. Sivok
30. New Mal Junction
31. Nagrakata
32. Binnaguri
33. Dalgaon
34. Hasimara
35. Alipurduar Junction

== Traction ==
Both trains are hauled by a Ghaziabad Loco Shed-based WAP-7 electric locomotive from Old Delhi to Alipurduar Junction and vice versa.

== Trivia ==
In a rare occurrence Sikkim Mahananda Express crosses the Mahananda River five times. The train is named after this river.

== Train schedule ==
Train No.15484 leaves Delhi (DLI) at 07:35 AM and reach to the destined stop Alipurduar Junction (APDJ) at 08:20 PM on day after another. Train No.15483 leaves Alipurduar Junction (APDJ) at 10:30 AM and reach to the destined stop Delhi (DLI) at 09:45 PM on day after another. During the journey of approximately 38 hours the train goes via 56 stations before reaching its destination.

== Accommodations ==
This train comprises 1 first AC [2-Tiers+3-Tiers], 10 AC 3-Tiers, 4 Sleeper class, 2Unreserved General Compartment, 1 Pantry car & 1 Luggage/Parcel and engine generator car is provided with the Guards' cabin. Total coach composition is 24.

== Incidents ==
- "Goons test guns on train kill Chief Ticket Inspector in Ghaziabad". Hindustan Times.
- "Crowd torches Mahananda Express in Hathras". The Indian Express. October 2009.

== See also ==
- New Jalpaiguri–New Delhi Superfast Express
