= Capital Express =

Capital Express may refer to:

- Capital Express (Turkey), a train service that runs between Istanbul and Ankara
- Capital Express (India), a train service that runs between New Jalpaiguri Junction and Rajendra Nagar Terminal
