= Araria–Thakurganj–Galgalia railway line =

Railway line in India

Overview
- Status: Operational
- Owner: Indian Railways
- Locale: Bihar
- Termini: Araria; Galgalia
- Stations: 17

Service
- Operator: Northeast Frontier Railway

History
- Opened: 2025

Technical
- Line length: 111 kilometres (69 mi)
- Track gauge: 1,676 mm (5 ft 6 in) 5 ft 6 in (1,676 mm) broad gauge

Araria–Thakurganj–Galgalia railway line is a railway line in Bihar. The line traverses out from Katihar–Siliguri line in Galgalia, and goes towards Thakurganj Junction and ends in Araria.

== Route ==
The Araria–Thalurganj line acts as an alternate route between Kosi region of Bihar with northern part of West Bengal. The 111 kilometres (69 mi) lines has 17 stations en route. The line has 12 major bridges, notably on Mechi River, Kankai River & Ratua River. The Kankai River railway bridge is the longest in this line stretching to 900.25 metres (2,953.6 ft) length.

== See also ==
- Katihar–Siliguri Intercity Express (via Purnea)
- New Jalpaiguri–Alipurduar–Samuktala Road line
- Katihar–Siliguri line
