= KOJ =

KOJ may refer to:

- Kagoshima Airport (IATA: KOJ), Kirishima, Kagoshima Prefecture, Japan
- Kokrajhar railway station (Indian Railways station code: KOJ), Assam, India
