= Patna Ghat railway station =

Railway station in Bihar

General information
- Location: Maruf Ganj, Patna, Bihar; India
- Coordinates: 25.5874°N 85.2379°E
- Elevation: 56 metres (184 ft)
- System: Indian Railways station
- Owner: Indian Railways
- Operator: East Central Railway
- Platforms: 1
- Tracks: 4
- Connections: Auto stand

Construction
- Structure type: Standard (on-ground station)
- Parking: No
- Cycle facilities: No

Other information
- Status: Closed
- Station code: PTG
- Zone(s): East Central Railway
- Division(s): Danapur

Services
Preceding station	Indian Railways	Following station
Patna Sahib towards ?	East Central Railway zone Patna Saheb–Fatuha section	Deedarganj towards ?
Location
- Location within India Location within Bihar

Patna Ghat railway station (station code: PTG) was a small railway station located in Patna City in Patna. It is located near Marufganj, Patna City, Patna district, of the Indian state of Bihar. The railway station as of now is not in use by the Indian Railways. It serves Patna city. The station consists of a single platform.
