= Katihar–Siliguri Intercity Express (via Purnea) =

Indian railways express train

Overview
- Service type: Express
- First service: 16 September 2025; 3 months ago
- Current operator: Northeast Frontier Railway

Route
- Termini: Katihar; Siliguri Junction
- Stops: 16
- Distance travelled: 229 km (142 mi)
- Average journey time: 5 hrs 30 mins
- Service frequency: Daily
- Train number: 15701 / 15702

On-board services
- Class: General Unreserved (UR)
- Seating arrangements: Yes
- Catering facilities: No
- Observation facilities: Large windows
- Baggage facilities: No
- Other facilities: Below the seats

Technical
- Rolling stock: LHB coach
- Track gauge: 1,676 mm (5 ft 6 in)
- Operating speed: 42 km/h (26 mph) average including halts.

The 15701 / 15702 Katihar–Siliguri Intercity Express (via Purnea) is an express train belonging to Indian Railways Northeast Frontier Railway that runs between Katihar Junction of Bihar and Siliguri Junction of West Bengal in India.

== Operation ==
It operates as train number 15701 from Platform 3 of Katihar Junction and reaches Platform 5 of Siliguri Junction and as train number 15702 in the reverse direction serving the states of Bihar & West Bengal. This train runs on Araria-Thakurganj-Galgalia railway line and Katihar–Siliguri line.

== Coaches ==
15701 / 15702 Katihar–Siliguri Intercity Express (via Purnea) runs with 11 LHB Coaches in the following composition:

- 9 General Unreserved (UR)
- 1 Second Seating Luggage and Brake Van (2S)
- 1 Generator Luggage and Brake Van (EOG)

Katihar–Siliguri Intercity Express (via Purnea) is run with one rake and is maintained at the New Coaching Depot, located at Katihar.

As is customary with most train services in India, coach composition may be amended at the discretion of Indian Railways depending on demand.

== Routing ==
The 15701 / 02 Katihar - Siliguri Junction Intercity Express runs from

- Siliguri Junction via
- Bagdogra
- Naksalbari
- Thakurganj
- Araria
- Purnea Junction to
- Katihar Junction.

== Traction ==
The train is hauled by WDP-4D/WDP-4/WDP-4B Locomotive of Diesel Loco Shed, Siliguri for its entire journey from Siliguri Junction to Katihar.

== See also ==
- Katihar–Siliguri Intercity Express (via Barsoi)
- Jogbani–Siliguri Town Intercity Express
