= Jogbani–Siliguri Town Intercity Express =

Indian railways express train

Jogbani - Siliguri Town Intercity Express

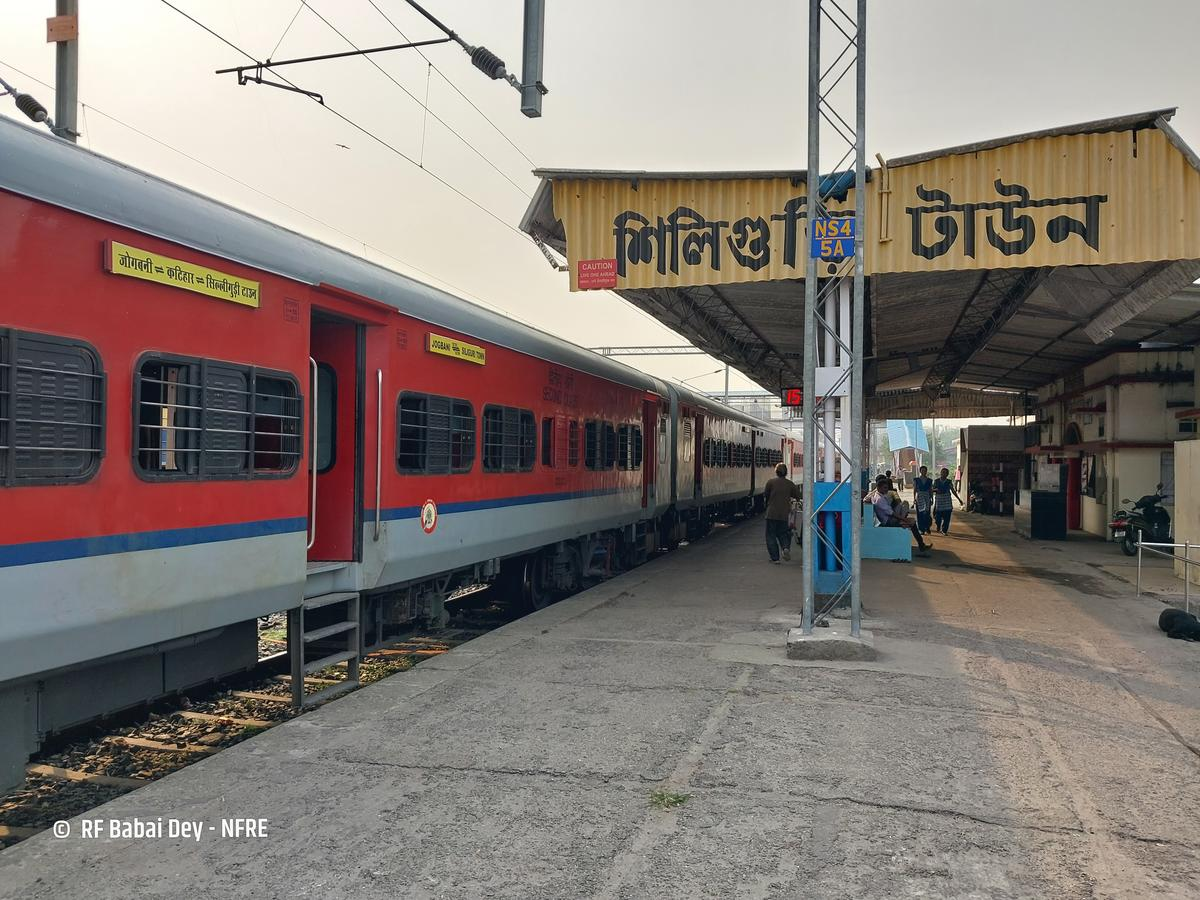
- Jogbani Siliguri Express is standing at Siliguri Town

Overview
- Service type: Express
- First service: 2 March 2024; 2 years ago
- Current operator: Northeast Frontier Railway

Route
- Termini: Jogbani; Siliguri Town
- Stops: 14
- Distance travelled: 314 km (195 mi)
- Average journey time: 7 hours
- Service frequency: Monday, Tuesaday, Thursday, Friday and Saturday
- Train number: 15723 / 15724

On-board services
- Classes: AC Chair Car, Non AC Chair Car, General Unreserved (UR)
- Seating arrangements: Yes
- Catering facilities: Yes ( E - catering available at some stations)

Technical
- Rolling stock: LHB coach
- Track gauge: 1,676 mm (5 ft 6 in)
- Operating speed: 45 km/h (28 mph)

The 15723 / 24 Jogbani - Siliguri Town Intercity Express is an express train belonging to Indian Railways Northeast Frontier Railway that runs between Jogbani of Bihar and Siliguri Town of West Bengal in India.

== Coaches ==
15723/24 Jogbani - Siliguri Town Intercity Express runs with 18 LHB Coaches in the following composition:

- 1 AC Chair Car (CC)
- 3 Second Seating (2S)
- 12 General Unreserved (UR)
- 1 Second Seating Luggage and Brake Van (2S)
- 1 Generator Luggage and Brake Van (EOG)

Jogbani - Siliguri Town Intercity is run with one rake and is maintained at the New Coaching Depot, located at Katihar.

As is customary with most train services in India, coach composition may be amended at the discretion of Indian Railways depending on demand.

== Service ==
The 15723 Jogbani - Siliguri Town Intercity Express covers the distance of 314 km (195 mi) in seven hours (45 km/h) and in six hours 45 mins as the 15724 Siliguri Town - Jogbani Intercity Express (47 km/h).

As the average speed of the train is lower than 55 km/h (34 mph), as per railway rules, its fare doesn't includes a Superfast surcharge.

== Routing ==
The 15723 / 24 Jogbani - Siliguri Town Intercity Express runs from

- Jogbani via
- Forbesganj
- Araria
- Purnia Junction
- Katihar Junction
- Barsoi Junction
- Dalkhola
- Kishanganj
- Aluabari Road Junction
- Thakurganj
- Bagdogra
- Siliguri Junction to
- Siliguri Town.

== Traction ==
As the entire route is fully electrified, a Siliguri,-based WAP-7 locomotive powers the train for its entire journey.

== See also ==
- Katihar–Siliguri Intercity Express (via Purnea)
- Katihar–Siliguri Intercity Express (via Barsoi)
