= Khagaria Junction railway station =

Railway station in Khagaria, Bihar, India

KHAGARIA JUNCTION

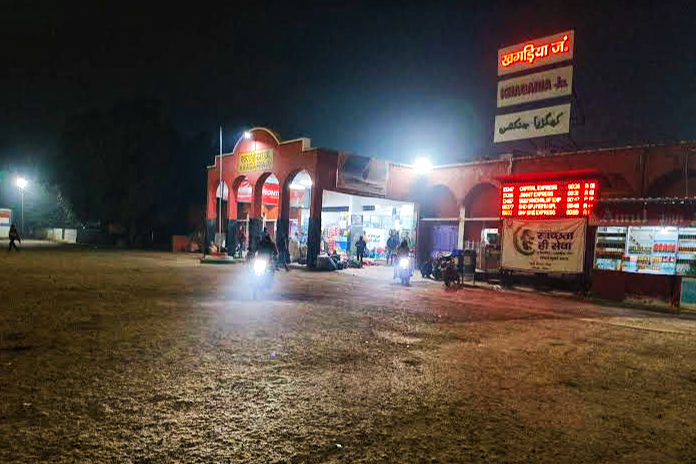
- Khagaria Junction Railway station

General information
- Location: Khagaria, Khagaria district, Bihar; India
- Coordinates: 25°30′0″N 86°28′0″E
- Elevation: 36 metres (118 ft)
- System: Indian Railways station
- Owner: Indian Railways
- Operator: East Central Railways
- Lines: Barauni–Guwahati line; Barauni–Katihar section; Samastipur–Khagaria Loop Line
- Platforms: 3
- Tracks: 6

Construction
- Structure type: Standard on ground
- Parking: Available
- Accessible: Available

Other information
- Status: Functioning
- Station code: KGG
- Zone(s): East Central Railway
- Division(s): Sonpur

History
- Former names: East Indian Railway
Services
Preceding station	Indian Railways	Following station
East Central Railway zone
Samastipur towards Katihar Junction	Barauni–Katihar section Towards Saharsa and Purnia	Mansi towards Barauni Junction
Begusarai towards Katihar Junction	Barauni–Katihar section	Katihar towards Barauni Junction
Munger towards ?	Munger Ganga Bridge Towards Jamalpur and Bhagalpur	Terminus
Route map
Location
- Location within Bihar Location within India
- Interactive map

Khagaria Junction railway station (station code: KGG) is a railway station in the Sonpur railway division of East Central Railway. Khagaria Station is located in Khagaria block in Khagaria district in the Indian state of Bihar.

As of 2024, Khagaria Junction station is one of six stops along the route of Indian Railways' new Jalpaiguri-Patna Vande Bharat Express train.

== Trains ==
- Jogbani–Danapur Vande Bharat Express
- Dibrugarh Rajdhani Express
- Champaran Humsafar Express
