= Ranchi–Kamakhya Express =

Train in India

Ranchi – Kamakhya Express

Overview
- Service type: Express
- First service: 6 February 2002; 24 years ago
- Current operator: Northeast Frontier Railway

Route
- Termini: Ranchi Junction (RNC); Kamakhya Junction (KYQ)
- Stops: 25
- Distance travelled: 1,191 km (740 mi)
- Average journey time: 27 hours
- Service frequency: Weekly
- Train number: 15661 / 15662

On-board services
- Classes: AC 2 Tier, AC 3 Tier, Sleeper 3 Tier, Unreserved
- Seating arrangements: Yes
- Sleeping arrangements: Yes
- Catering facilities: Yes
- Observation facilities: LHB coach
- Entertainment facilities: No
- Baggage facilities: Available

Technical
- Rolling stock: 2
- Track gauge: 1,676 mm (5 ft 6 in)
- Operating speed: 44 km/h (27 mph)

The 15561/15562 Ranchi–Kamakhya Express is an express train belonging to Northeast Frontier Railway zone that runs between the city Ranchi Junction of Jharkhand and Kamakhya Junction of Assam in India.

It operates as train number 15561 from Ranchi Junction to Kamakhya Junction and as train number 15562 in the reverse direction, serving the states of Assam, Bihar, West Bengal and Jharkhand.

== Service ==
The 15661/Ranchi–Kamakhya Express has an average speed of 44 km/h and covers 1191 km in 27 hrs. 15662/Kamakhya–Ranchi Express has an average speed of 45 km/h and covers 1191 km in 26 hrs 25 mins.

== Route and halts ==
The important halts of the train are :

JHARKHAND

1. Ranchi Junction (Starts)
2. Muri Junction
3. Bokaro Steel City
4. Chandrapura
5. Dhanbad
6. Pakur railway station

WEST BENGAL

1. Asansol Junction
2. Durgapur
3. Siuri
4. Sainthia Junction
5. Rampurhat Junction
6. New Farakka Junction
7. Malda Town
8. New Jalpaiguri Junction
9. Siliguri Junction
10. Malbazar Junction
11. Binnaguri Junction
12. Hasimara Railway Station
13. Alipurduar Junction

BIHAR

1. Barsoi
2. Kishanganj

ASSAM

1. Kokrajhar
2. New Bongaigaon
3. Goalpara
4. Kamakhya Junction (Ends)

Note: Bold letters indicates Major Railway Stations/Major Cities.

== Traction ==
Ranchi Kamakhya Express is hauled by an Asansol Electric Loco Shed-based WAG-5/WAP-4 or Howrah Electric Loco Shed-based WAP-4 from Ranchi to New Jalpaiguri, From New Jalpaiguri to Kamakhya the train is hauled by Siliguri Diesel Loco Shed-based WDM-3A/WDP-4D/WDP-4 Locomotive .

== Coach composition ==
The train consists of 22 coaches:

- 1 AC II Tier coach
- 10 Sleeper coaches
- 4 General coaches
- 2 Second-class Luggage/parcel van

The train doesn't have Pantry Car Coach, but On board Catering services and E-Catering Services are available.

== See also ==
- New Jalpaiguri–Ranchi Weekly Express
