= Deedarganj railway station =

Railway station in Bihar

DEEDARGANJ
- Indian Railways logo

General information
- Location: National Highway 30, Deedarganj, Patna, Bihar; India
- Coordinates: 25.5724°N 85.2532°E
- Elevation: 54 metres (177 ft)
- System: Indian Railways station
- Owner: Indian Railways
- Operator: East Central Railway
- Platforms: 2
- Tracks: 4
- Connections: Auto stand

Construction
- Structure type: Standard (on-ground station)
- Parking: No
- Cycle facilities: No

Other information
- Status: Functioning
- Station code: DDGJ
- Zone(s): East Central Railway
- Division(s): Danapur

Services
Preceding station	Indian Railways	Following station
Patna Ghat towards ?	East Central Railway zone Patna Saheb–Fatuha section	Banka Ghat towards ?
Location
- Location within Patna Location within Bihar Location within India
- Interactive map Deedarganj

Deedarganj railway station (station code: DDGJ), is a small railway station in Patna district, in the Indian state of Bihar. It serves Patna city. The station consists of 2 platforms.
