= Naugachia railway station =

Station on the Barauni–Katihar section in Bihar, India

Naugachia
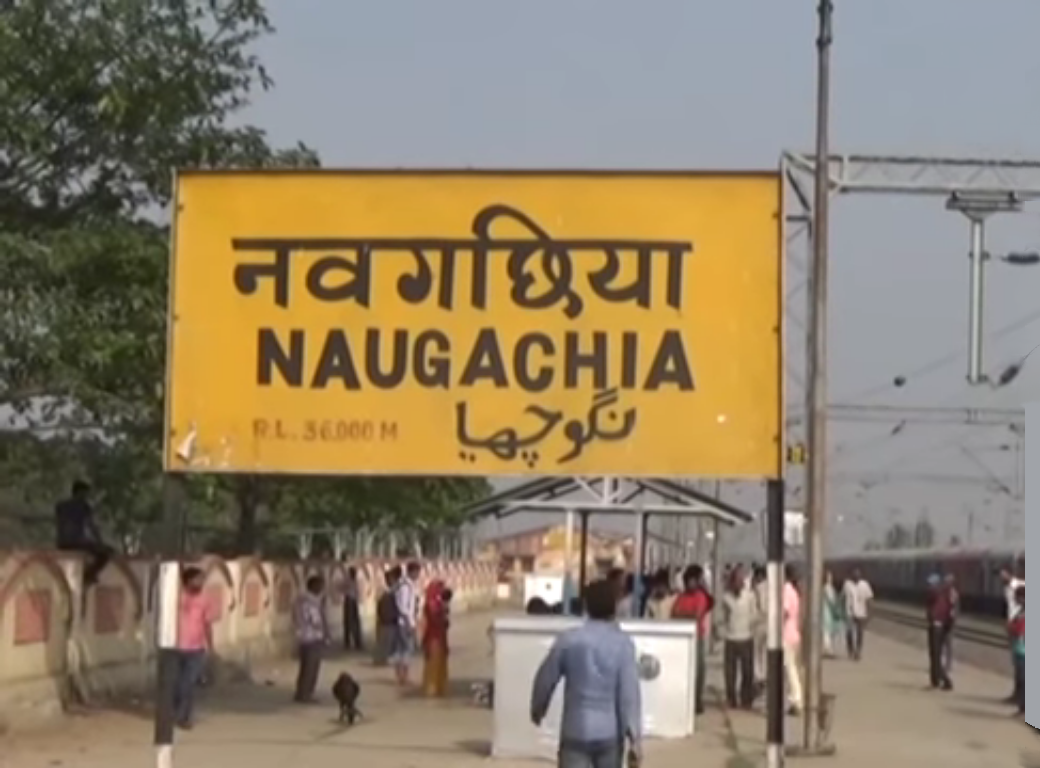

General information
- Location: Naugachhia, Bihar, India; India
- Coordinates: 25°20′10″N 87°02′45″E
- System: Indian Railways station
- Owner: Indian Railways
- Operator: East Central Railway
- Line: Barauni–Katihar section
- Platforms: 03
- Tracks: 04

Construction
- Structure type: Standard on ground station
- Parking: Yes
- Cycle facilities: No

Other information
- Status: Functioning
- Station code: NNA

History
- Former names: East Indian Railway

Services
Preceding station	Indian Railways	Following station
Kharik towards ?	East Central Railway zone Barauni–Katihar section	Katareah towards ?
Location
- Location within Bihar

Naugachia railway station (station code: NNA) is on the Barauni–Katihar section of the Sonpur railway division and serves the town of Naugachhia in the Indian state of Bihar.

== Geography ==
The station lies on the northern side of the Ganges and traverses the Kosi basin. In Bihar, the Kosi is widely referred to as the "Sorrow of Bihar" as it has caused widespread human suffering over the centuries through flooding and frequent changes in course. Over the last 250 years, the Kosi has shifted its course over 120 kilometres (75 mi) from east to west. In August 2008, it picked up an old channel it had abandoned over a century ago near the Nepal–India border, and caused enormous damage in a wide area covering several districts. The breach in the Kosi embankment which caused the devastating flood in 2008, was repaired in 2009 and the river has since been flowing along its original course. The floods continue and threaten even the Barauni–Katihar tracks. The entire region portrays "a bleak picture of broken houses, flattened fields and ravaged lives, signs of all the havoc the previous floods and land erosion wreaked here earlier."

== Trains ==
=== Major trains ===
1. New Delhi–Dibrugarh Rajdhani Express (Via New Tinsukia)
2. Lokmanya Tilak Terminus–Kamakhya AC Superfast Express
3. Katihar - Delhi Junction, Champaran Humsafar Express
4. Kamakhya–Anand Vihar Express
5. Kamakhya - Delhi Northeast Express
6. Kamakhya–Rohtak Amrit Bharat Express
7. Agartala - Deoghar Weekly Express
8. Guwahati-Jammu Tawi Amarnath Express
9. Guwahati - Jammu Tawi Lohit Express
10. Dibrugarh–Chandigarh Express
11. New Jalpaiguri -Rajendra Nagar Capital Express
12. Kamakhya-Patna Capital Express
13. Dibrugarh - Lokmanya Tilak Terminus Superfast Express
14. Kamakhya - Jodhpur, Bhagat Ki Kothi Express
15. Alipurduar - Delhi Junction Mahananda Express
16. Kamakhya - Udaipur City Kavi Guru Express
17. New Tinsukia–Rajendra Nagar Weekly Express
18. Guwahati - Bikaner Express
19. Guwahati - Okha Dwarka Express
20. Guwahati - Barmer Express
21. Dibrugarh-Lalgarh Avadh Assam Express
22. Kamakhya - Dr. Ambedkar Nagar Express
23. Kamakhya–Shri Mata Vaishno Devi Katra Express
24. New Jalpaiguri - Ranchi Weekly Express
25. Anand Vihar Terminal - Jogbani Seemanchal Express
26. Katihar Junction - Amritsar Amrapali Express
27. Kishanganj–Ajmer Garib Nawaz Express
28. Muzaffarpur - SMVT Bengaluru Weekly Express
29. Saharsa - Sealdah Hate Bazare Express
30. Katihar - Tatanagar Express

== Electrification ==
Electrification of the 809 kilometres (503 mi) long Barauni–Katihar–Guwahati section was sanctioned in 2008. As of 2011, work on electrification of Barabanki–Gorakhpur–Barauni–New Jalpaiguri route was in progress. Adequate funds have been provided in the budget for 2011–12 to take up work in the New Jalapiguri–New Bongaigaon–Guwahati section. The section is fully electrified. Most of the Delhi and Amritsar-bound trains run on electric locomotives. Amrapali Express was the first train to run on electric locomotive, then after Rajdhani Express, North-east Express, Purvottar Sampark Kranti Express, Seemanchal Express, Tripura Sundari Express have electric engines.
