= Pothia, Kishanganj =

Pothia, Kishanganj पोठिया
- Location in Bihar
- Coordinates: 26.315°N 88.177°E
- District: Kishanganj district
- State: Bihar
- Country: India

Population (2011)
  - Total: 699

Language
  - Official: Hindi

Pothia is a village in Kishanganj district of Bihar state of India. language surjhapuri pothia Bazar ward number 14 pothia Durga mandir

== See also ==
- Kishanganj district
