= Thakurganj Junction =

Railway station in Kishanganj, Bihar, India

Thakurganj

General information
- Location: State Highway 63, Thakurganj, Bihar; India
- Coordinates: 26.4268°N 88.1293°E
- Elevation: 79 metres (259 ft)
- System: Indian Railways station
- Owner: Indian Railways
- Operator: Northeast Frontier Railway
- Lines: Katihar–Siliguri line; Araria-Thakurganj-Galgalia railway line
- Platforms: 2
- Tracks: 3

Construction
- Structure type: At-grade
- Parking: Available
- Accessible: Yes

Other information
- Status: Open
- Station code: TKG
- Zone(s): Northeast Frontier Railway
- Division(s): Katihar

History
- Electrified: Yes (2022)
Location
- Location within Bihar Location within India

Thakurganj Junction (station code: TKG) serves Thakurganj town in Kishanganj district in the Indian state of Bihar. The Mechi flowing nearby forms the boundary between Nepal and India in the area. On the other side of the border lies Prithivinagar town of Nepal. This railway station lies on Katihar–Siliguri line and Araria-Thakurganj-Galgalia railway line of Indian Railways.

== Trains ==
- Delhi-Alipurduar Mahananda Express
- Sealdah-Alipurduar Kanchan Kanya Express
- New Jalpaiguri-Arrah Junction Capital Express
- New Jalpaiguri - Ranchi Weekly Express
- New Jalpaiguri–Amritsar Amrit Bharat Express
- Kamakhya–Arrah Junction Capital Express
- Siliguri Junction-Balurghat Express
- Siliguri-Katihar Intercity Express (via Barsoi)
- Siliguri - Katihar Intercity Express (via Purnea)
- Siliguri - Radhikapur Express
- Jogbani–Siliguri Town Intercity Express
- Radhikapur–Siliguri Junction DEMU
- Siliguri Junction–Malda Court DEMU
- Siliguri Junction–Katihar DEMU

== Etymology ==
The place is named after Rabindra Nath Tagore (Rabindra Nath Thakur in Bengali).

== History ==
Thakurganj Junction was part of Darjeeling Himalayan Railways, Thakurganj Junction was the connecting point of DHR and Outh Tiruhat Railway.

Work for conversion of the Aluabari–Siliguri section from metre gauge to broad gauge was taken up in 2008, train services in the section was suspended and conversion work completed early in 2011.

Rail Electrification in this line completed on 2022, and New Line project Arariya-Galgalia is under construction.

Manish Kumar joined Thakurganj Station as Station Superintendent in May 2019. Following Staffs are currently working at Thakurganj Railway Station:

(i) Station Superintendent: Manish Kumar

(ii) Station Master: Naresh Kumar Hembrom

(iii) Station Master: Rahul Saha

(iv) Station Master: Sonu Kumar Choudhary

(v) Commercial Superintendent: Ajay Kumar Singh

(vi) Senior CC: Rajkumar Ray

(vi) Porter: Bhupesh Kumar

Preceding station	Indian Railways	Following station
Taiabpur towards ?	Northeast Frontier Railway zone Katihar–Siliguri line	Piprithan towards ?
