= Kokrajhar railway station =

Railway station in Kokrajhar, Assam, India

Kokrajhar
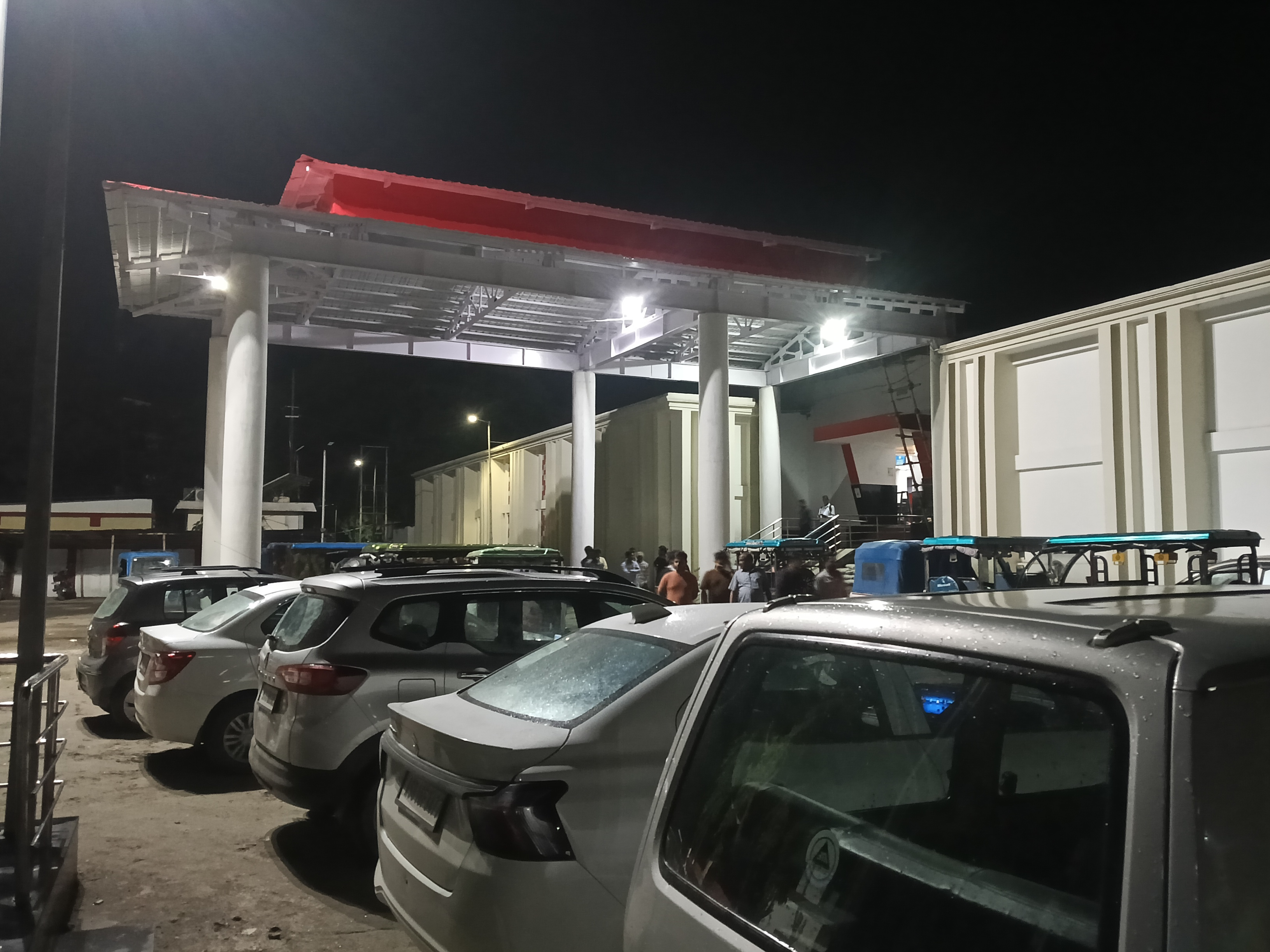
- Entrance view of Kokrajhar Railway Station

General information
- Location: RNB Road, Kokrajhar, Assam; India
- Coordinates: 26.4050°N 90.2741°E
- Elevation: 49 metres (161 ft)
- System: Indian Railways station
- Owner: Indian Railways
- Line: New Jalpaiguri–New Bongaigaon section
- Platforms: 3
- Tracks: 4
- Connections: Auto stand

Construction
- Structure type: At grade
- Parking: Yes
- Cycle facilities: No

Other information
- Status: Double-line electrified
- Station code: KOJ
- Zone(s): Northeast Frontier Railway zone
- Division(s): Alipurduar
Location
- Location within Assam Location within India

Kokrajhar railway station is a major railway station in Kokrajhar district, Assam. Its code is KOJ. It serves Kokrajhar City. The station consists of three platforms. The station lies on the New Jalpaiguri–New Bongaigaon section of Barauni–Guwahati line of Northeast Frontier Railway. This station falls under Alipurduar railway division.

As of October 2026, there are plans by the governments of India and Bhutan to build a 69.04 km cross-border railway line connecting Kokrajhar station to Gelephu in Bhutan. The total cost of the project is estimated to be Rs. 3,500 crores. The project includes the development of six new stations, namely Balajan, Garubhasa, Runikhata, Shantipur, Dadgiri and Gelephu.

== Trains ==
Some of the major trains that run from Kokrajhar are :

- New Jalpaiguri - Guwahati Vande Bharat Express
- New Delhi–Dibrugarh Rajdhani Express
- Dibrugarh - Gomti Nagar Amrit Bharat Express
- Howrah–Dibrugarh Kamrup Express
- Dibrugarh–Chandigarh Express
- Anand Vihar–Kamakhya Northeast Express
- Dibrugarh–Kanyakumari Vivek Express
- Guwahati–Bengaluru Cantt. Kaziranga Express
- Kolkata–Guwahati Garib Rath Express
- Silchar-Coimbatore Superfast Express
- Delhi–Dibrugarh Brahmaputra Mail
- Dibrugarh–Lalgarh Avadh Assam Express
- Dr. Ambedkar Nagar–Kamakhya Express
- Charlapalli–Kamakhya Amrit Bharat Express
- Alipurduar–Kamakhya Intercity Express
- Ranchi–Kamakhya Express
- Udaipur City–Kamakhya Kavi Guru Express
- Bhagat Ki Kothi–Kamakhya Express
- Gandhidham–Kamakhya Express
- Kamakhya Gaya Express
- Aronai Express
- New Tinsukia–Tambaram Express
- Sealdah–Silchar Kanchanjunga Express
- Sealdah–Sabroom Kanchanjunga Express
- Kamakhya–Shri Mata Vaishno Devi Katra Express
- Kamakhya–Rohtak Amrit Bharat Express
- Alipurduar–Lumding Intercity Express
- Kamakhya–Anand Vihar Express
- Lokmanya Tilak Terminus–Guwahati Express (via Katihar)
- Dibrugarh–Rajendra Nagar Weekly Express
- Dibrugarh - Deogarh Express
- New Jalpaiguri - Guwahati Express
- New Jalpaiguri - Bongaigaon Express
