= Galgalia =

- Village
- Location in Bihar, India Galgalia (India)
- Coordinates: 26°31′37″N 88°06′49″E
- Country: India
- State: Bihar
- District: Kishanganj

Government
  - Type: Panchayati raj (India)
  - Body: Gram panchayat
- Elevation: 87 m (285 ft)

Languages
  - Official: Maithili, Hindi
- Time zone: UTC+5:30 (IST)
- ISO 3166 code: IN-BR
- Lok Sabha constituency: Kishanganj
- Vidhan Sabha constituency: Thakurganj

Galgalia is a village in Kishanganj District, Bihar state, India.

== Transport ==
Galagalia railway station is situated on the Katihar-Siliguri Line and Araria-Thakurganj-Galgalia railway line of Indian Railways from where following trains are available:

- Sealdah - Alipurduar Kanchan Kanya Express
- Delhi Junction - Alipurduar Mahananda Express
- New Jalpaiguri-Ara Junction Capital Express
- Kamakhya–Ara Junction Capital Express
- Siliguri Junction - Balurghat Express
- Siliguri Junction - Radhikapur Express
- Siliguri Junction - Katihar Express

There is a customs post on the border with Nepal's Jhapa District, Mechi Zone leading to Bhadrapur municipality. Citizens of India and Nepal cross this border freely. The foundation stone for a bridge across the Mechi River to Bhadrapur was laid in 2010. It is being built by the Government of Nepal.
