= Katihar–Siliguri Intercity Express (via Barsoi) =

Train in India

Katihar-Siliguri Intercity Express

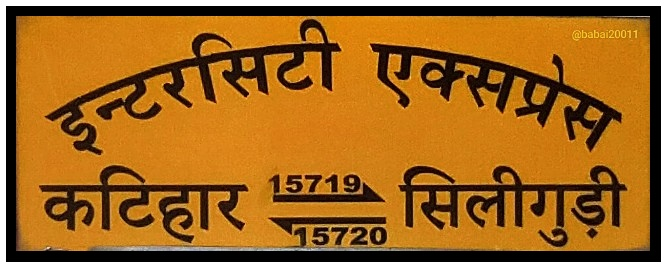
- Katihar-Siliguri InterCity Express train board.

Overview
- Service type: Express
- First service: 18 January 2011; 14 years ago
- Current operator: Northeast Frontier Railway

Route
- Termini: Katihar; Siliguri Junction
- Stops: 16
- Distance travelled: 203 km (126 mi)
- Average journey time: 5 hrs 15 mins
- Service frequency: Daily
- Train number: 15719 / 15720

On-board services
- Class: General Unreserved (UR)
- Seating arrangements: Yes
- Catering facilities: E-catering
- Observation facilities: Large windows
- Baggage facilities: No
- Other facilities: Below the seats

Technical
- Rolling stock: ICF coach
- Track gauge: 1,676 mm (5 ft 6 in)
- Operating speed: 43 km/h (27 mph) average including halts.

The 15719 / 15720 Katihar- Siliguri Intercity Express is an express train belonging to Indian Railways Northeast Frontier Railway that runs between Katihar Junction of Bihar and Siliguri Junction of West Bengal in India.

It operates as train number 15719 from Platform 7 of Katihar Junction and reaches Platform 3 of Siliguri Junction and as train number 15720 in the reverse direction serving the states of Bihar & West Bengal.

== Coaches ==
The 15719 / 20 Katihar - Siliguri Junction Intercity Express has ten general unreserved & two SLR (seating with luggage rake) coaches.

== Service ==
The 15719 Katihar Junction - Siliguri Junction Intercity Express covers the distance of 203.6 km (127 mi) in 5 hours 15 mins (39 km/h) and in 5 hours 15 mins as the 15720 Siliguri Junction - Katihar Junction Intercity Express (39 km/h).

As the average speed of the train is lower than 55 km/h (34 mph), as per railway rules, its fare doesn't includes a Superfast surcharge.

== Routing ==
The 15719 / 20 Katihar - Siliguri Junction Intercity Express runs from Katihar Junction via Barsoi Junction, Dalkhola, Kishanganj, Thakurganj, Galgalia, Adhikari, Naksalbari, Bagdogra, Matigara to Siliguri Junction.

== Traction ==
As the route is going to electrification, a Diesel Loco Shed, Siliguri based WDP4 / WDP4B / WDP4D diesel locomotive pulls the train to its destination.

== Incidents ==
On 10 May 2017, at 4:30 am Siliguri Katihar Intercity Express travelling from Katihar towards Siliguri Junction hits and kills an elephant between Bagdogra and Naksalbari in Darjeeling district of West Bengal.

== See also ==
- Katihar–Siliguri Intercity Express (via Purnea)
- Jogbani–Siliguri Town Intercity Express
