= Barsoi Junction railway station =

Railway station in Katihar, Bihar, India

BARSOI JUNCTION
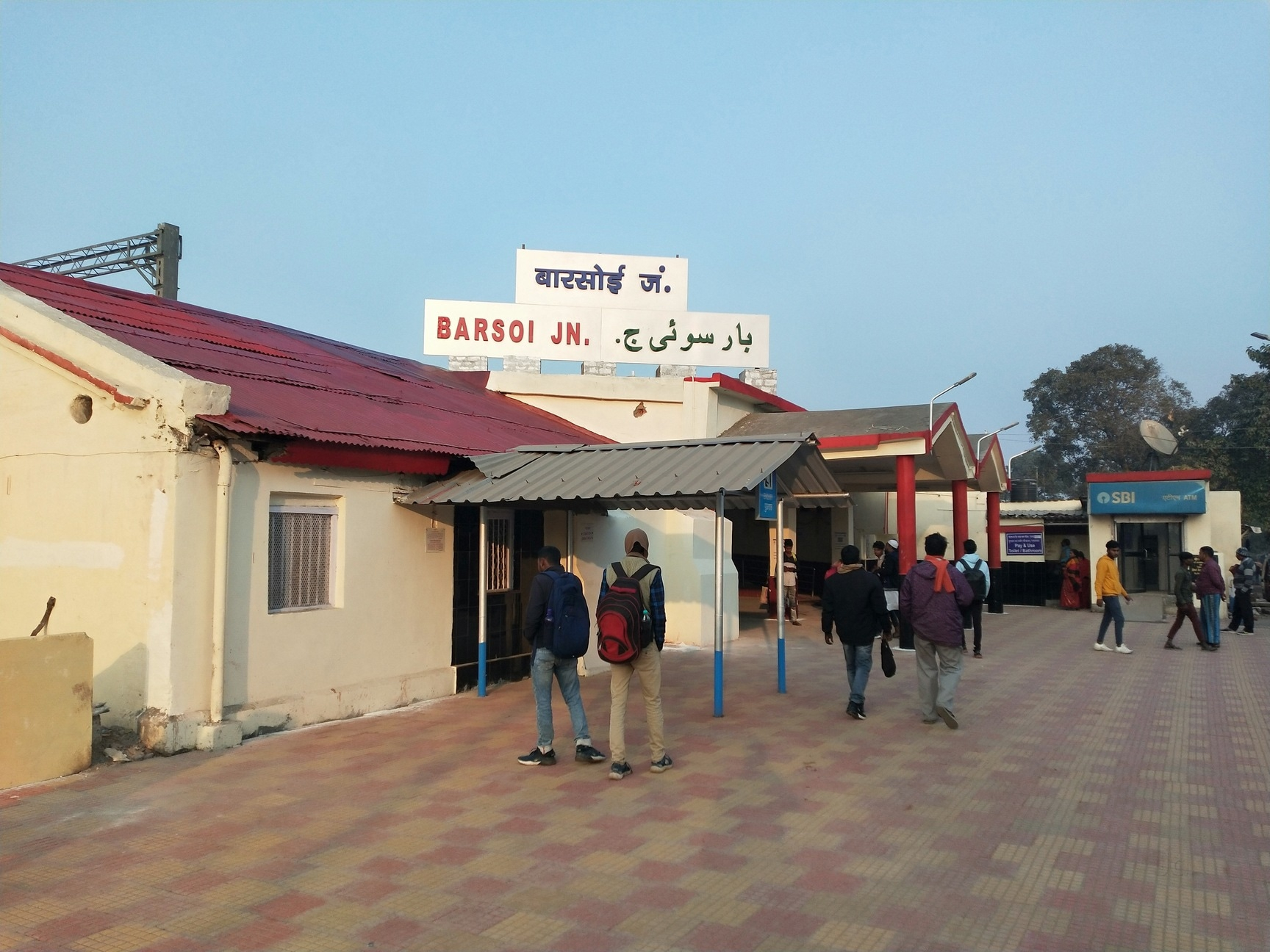

General information
- Location: Katihar district State highway, SH 98 Station Road, Barsoi, Raghunathpur- 854317 Bihar; India
- Coordinates: 25.6509°N 87.9226°E
- Elevation: 37 metres (121 ft)
- System: junction station
- Owner: Indian Railways
- Operator: North East Frontier Railway (NFR)
- Lines: Howrah–New Jalpaiguri line; Katihar–Siliguri line; Barauni–Guwahati line; Barsoi–Radhikapur branch line
- Platforms: 3
- Tracks: 6

Construction
- Structure type: At grade
- Parking: Available

Other information
- Status: Active
- Station code: BOE
- Zone(s): Northeast Frontier Railway
- Division(s): Katihar

History
- Opened: 1889
- Former names: Assam Behar State Railway

Services
Preceding station	Indian Railways	Following station
Northeast Frontier Railway zone
Katihar towards ?	Barauni–Guwahati line Towards New Jalpaiguri	Dalkhola towards ?
Katihar towards ?	Katihar–Siliguri line Towards Radhikapur	Raiganj towards ?
Malda Town towards ?	Howrah–New Jalpaiguri line Towards Howrah	Dalkhola towards ?
Location
- Location within India Location within Bihar

Barsoi Junction railway station serves Barsoi town and Katihar city in Katihar district in the Indian state of Bihar. It is a major and very important railway station having stoppages of premium trains like Howrah–New Jalpaiguri Vande Bharat Express. and New Jalpaiguri–Patna Vande Bharat Express. and New Jalpaiguri–Howrah Shatabdi Express.

== History ==
Assam Behar State Railway extended the 1,000 mm (3 ft 3 3/8 in)-wide metre-gauge railway from Parbatipur, now in Bangladesh, to Katihar in 1889. The connection was truncated with the partition of India in 1947, and the line now runs up to Radhikapur, near the Bangladesh border.

In 1948–50, as a part of the Assam Rail Link project, the Fakiragram–Kishanganj sector was connected to the North Eastern Railway network at Barsoi. The railway lines in the area started being converted to 5 ft 6 in (1,676 mm) broad gauge from the early 1960s.

== Amenities ==
Barsoi railway station has a four-bedded retiring room.

== Trains ==
Following major trains are available from Barsoi Junction railway station:

- Howrah–New Jalpaiguri Vande Bharat Express
- New Jalpaiguri–Patna Vande Bharat Express
- New Jalpaiguri–Howrah Shatabdi Express
- New Jalpaiguri - Tiruchchirappalli Amrit Bharat Express
- Charlapalli–Kamakhya Amrit Bharat Express
- Kamakhya–SMVT Bengaluru AC Superfast Express
- New Jalpaiguri - Nagercoil Amrit Bharat Express
- SMVT Bengaluru–Alipurduar Amrit Bharat Express
- Panvel–Alipurduar Amrit Bharat Express
- Kamakhya–Rohtak Amrit Bharat Express
- Kamakhya - Ranchi Express
- New Jalpaiguri - Chennai Superfast Express
- Kamakhya - Delhi Brahmaputra Mail
- New Tinsukia - Chennai Tambaram Express
- Silghat Town - Chennai Tambaram Nagaon Express
- Silchar–Secunderabad Express
- Dibrugarh - Mumbai LTT Express
- Sealdah - Alipurduar Kanchan Kanya Express
- Sealdah - Jalpaiguri Road Humsafar Express
- Dibrugarh - Gomti Nagar Amrit Bharat Express
- Kolkata–Radhikapur Express
- New Jalpaiguri - Digha Paharia Express
- Kamakhya–Anand Vihar Terminal North East Express
- Kamakhya - Udaipur City Kavi Guru Express
- Howrah - Radhikapur Kulik Express
- Jogbani–Siliguri Town Intercity Express
- Siliguri Junction - Katihar Intercity Express
- Siliguri Junction - Balurghat Intercity Express
- Dibrugarh - Lalgarh Avadh Assam Express
- New Jalpaiguri-Rajendra Nagar Capital Express
- Kamakhya - Rajendra Nagar Capital Express
- New Jalpaiguri–Malda Town Express
- Sealdah–Sabroom Kanchanjunga Express
- Sealdah–Silchar Kanchanjungha Express
- New Jalpaiguri–Amritsar Karmabhoomi Express
- Kamakhya - Puri Express
- Alipurduar - Delhi Sikkim Mahananda Express
- Guwahati - SMVT Bengaluru Kaziranga Superfast Express
- Sealdah - New Alipurduar Teesta Torsha Express
- Siliguri - Radhikapur Express
- Guwahati - Okha Dwarka Express
- Kamakhya–Shri Mata Vaishno Devi Katra Express
- Dibrugarh - Deogarh Express
- Jhajha–Dibrugarh Weekly Express
- Kishanganj–Ajmer Garib Nawaz Express

Preceding station	Indian Railways	Following station
Mukuria towards ?	Northeast Frontier Railway zone Katihar–Siliguri line	Khempur towards ?
Terminus	Northeast Frontier Railway zone Barsoi–Radhikapur branch line	Dachna towards ?
