= Dalkhola railway station =

Railway station in Dalkhola, West Bengal, India

Dalkhola
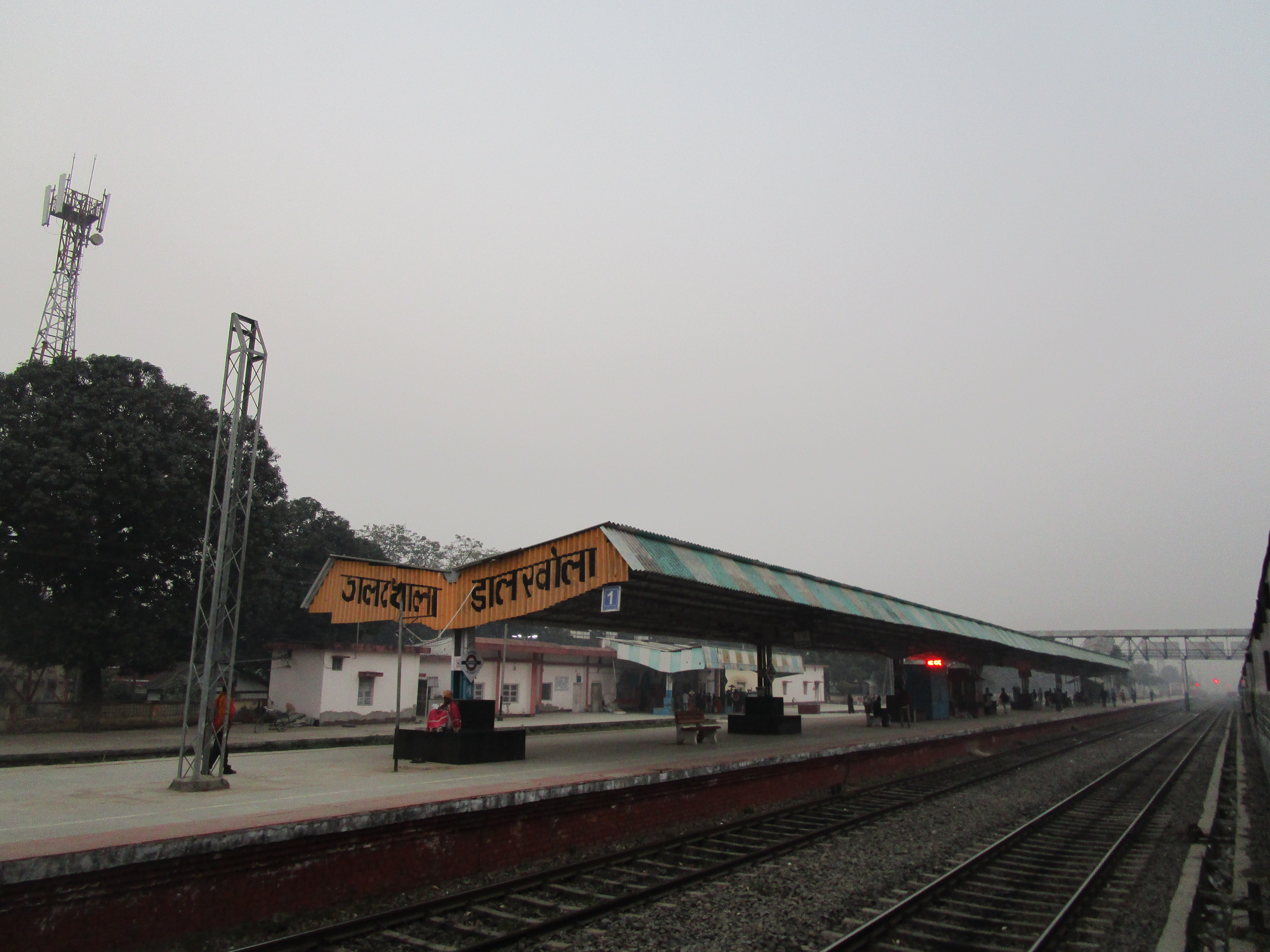
- Dalkhola railway station platform Location of Dalkhola railway station

General information
- Location: Dalkhola, Uttar Dinajpur district, West Bengal; India
- Coordinates: 25°52′28″N 87°50′20″E
- Elevation: 43 m (141 ft)
- System: Indian Railways station
- Owner: Indian Railways
- Operator: Northeast Frontier Railway
- Lines: Howrah–New Jalpaiguri line; Katihar-Siliguri line; Barauni–Guwahati line
- Platforms: 3
- Tracks: 6

Construction
- Structure type: At grade
- Parking: Available

Other information
- Status: Active
- Station code: DLK
- Zone(s): Northeast Frontier Railway zone
- Division(s): Katihar

History
- Opened: 1871; 155 years ago
Location
- Location within West Bengal Location within India

Dalkhola railway station is a railway station in Dalkhola, Uttar Dinajpur district, West Bengal, India. It is a standard II-R interlocked roadside station situated on electrified double line section at 43 metres above sea level. It also serves as a prominent rakepoint and the entry to the rest of the NFR zone. Part of the Katihar railway division of Northeast Frontier Railway, the station lies on Howrah–New Jalpaiguri line, Barauni–Guwahati line and Katihar-Siliguri line .

== Major trains ==
- Sealdah -New Alipurduar Padatik Superfast Express
- Dibrugarh-Lalgarh Avadh Assam Express
- Sealdah–Sabroom Kanchanjunga Express
- Sealdah–Silchar Kanchenjunga Express
- Barmer–Guwahati Express
- Delhi-Kamakhya Brahmaputra Mail
- Delhi-Alipurduar Mahananda Express
- Sealdah-Alipurduar Kanchan Kanya Express
- Kamakhya-Patna Capital Express
- Jogbani–Siliguri Town Intercity Express
- Siliguri Junction - Radhikapur Express
- Sealdah - New Alipurduar Teesta Torsha Express
- Siliguri Junction-Balurghat Express
- Siliguri Junction-Katihar Express
- New Jalpaiguri-Rajendra Nagar Capital Express
- Bikaner–Guwahati Express
- Sealdah-Bamanhat Uttar Banga Express
- New Jalpaiguri -Malda Town Express
- New Jalpaiguri–Sitamarhi Weekly Express
- Kishanganj–Ajmer Garib Nawaz Express

== Gallery ==
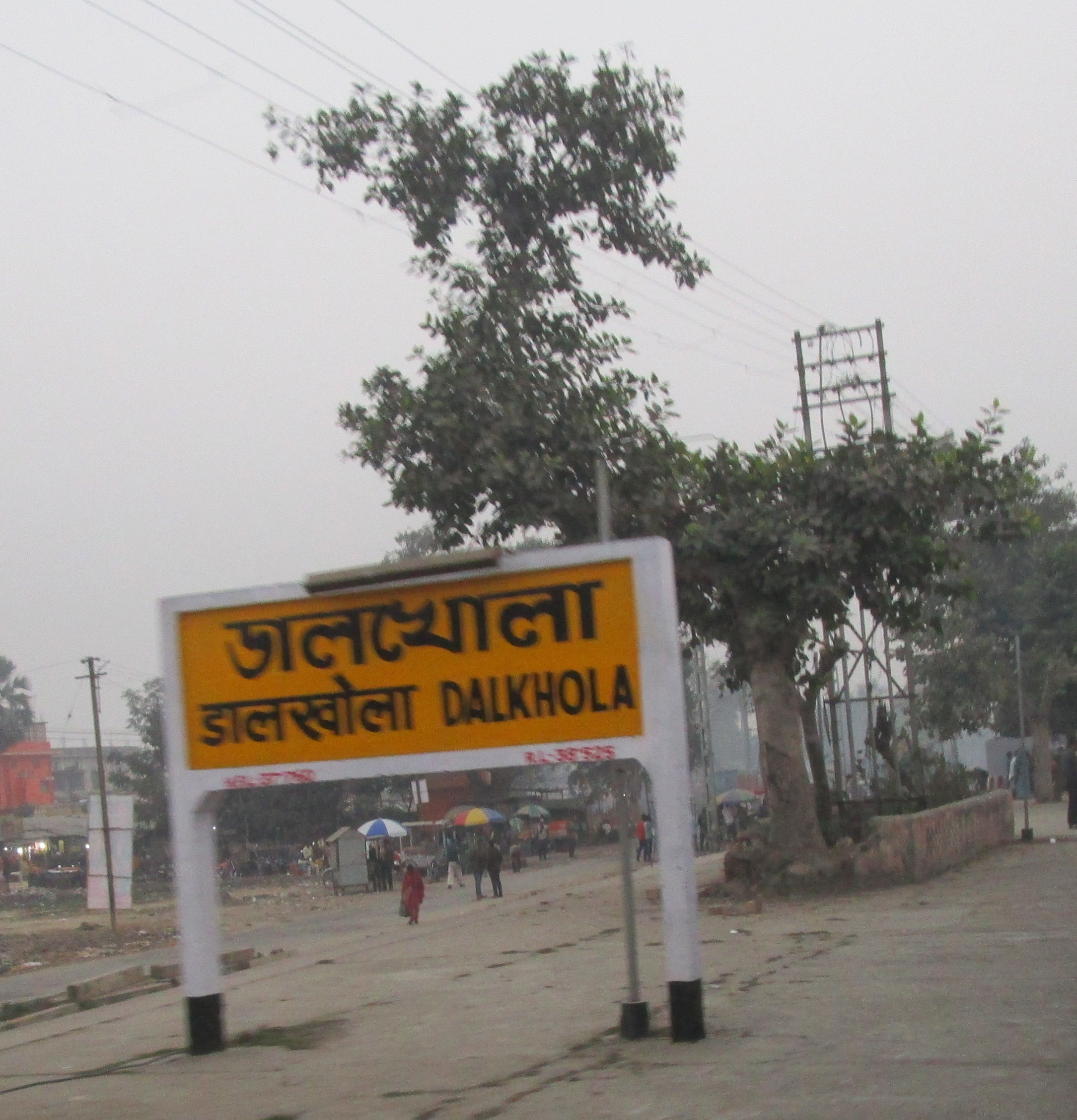
Dalkhola railway station board
