= Patna Sahib railway station =

Railway station in Patna, Bihar, India

PATNA SAHIB

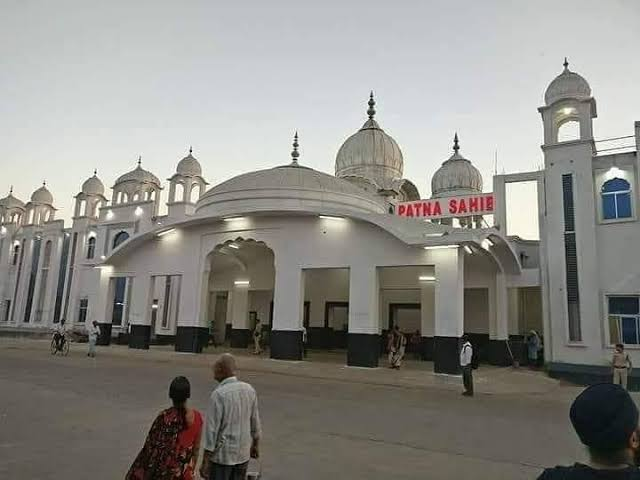
- Entrance view of Patna Sahib railway station

General information
- Other names: Patna City
- Location: Patna Saheb, Patna, Bihar; India
- Coordinates: 25°35′9″N 85°13′50″E
- Elevation: 59 metres (194 ft)
- System: Express train and Passenger train station
- Owner: East Central Railway of the Indian Railways
- Operator: Indian Railways
- Lines: Howrah–Delhi main line Asansol–Patna section
- Platforms: 4
- Tracks: 7
- Connections: Patna Ghat, Gulzarbagh, Fatuha

Construction
- Structure type: Standard (on ground station)
- Parking: Available

Other information
- Status: Functioning
- Station code: PNC
- Zone(s): East Central Railway
- Division(s): Danapur

History
- Opened: 1861
- Rebuilt: 2017
- Electrified: (2003–2004); 25 kV 50 Hz AC (Double Electric–line)
- Former names: Begumpur station
Services
Preceding station	Indian Railways	Following station
East Central Railway
Gulzarbagh towards ?	Asansol–Patna section Towards Islampur, Fatuha	Deedarganj towards ?
Route map
Location
- Location within India Location within Bihar Location within Patna
- Interactive map of Patna Sahib

Patna Sahib railway station, station code PNC (formerly Patna City Station), which came into existence even before Patna Junction in 1861, is an important railway station in the Danapur railway division of East Central Railway. It is a part of the Patna railway hub of five major stations: Patna Junction, Patliputra Junction, Rajendra Nagar Terminal, Danapur and Patna Saheb station. Patna Saheb is connected to metropolitan areas of India, by the Delhi–Kolkata main line via Mugalsarai–Patna route. Patna Saheb is located in Patna City in Patna district in the Indian state of Bihar. Due to its location on the Howrah–Patna–Varanasi main line many Patna, Barauni-bound express trains coming from Howrah, Sealdah stop here. Based on Income it is 'A' Grade railway station and has good Passenger Amenities.This is important railway station for Sikh devotees as tenth Sikh Guru Gobind Singh ji was born at Patna Saheb. There will be 2 escalators in near future at Patna Saheb Station as Foundation Stone is laid done. After Platform Number-2 and 3 a New Rail line and New Platform is being proposed.

== History ==
Patna Saheb (or Sahib) station's former name is Begampur station, in memory of Begum Saheba.

Patna Saheb station's present name was declared on 8 Jan 1976 by the railway minister Boota Singh.

== Facilities ==
The major facilities available are Upper Class Waiting room & hall, computerized reservation facility, reserved lounge, retiring room, clock room and platforms well covered by sheds. There is a pay and use toilet, tea stall, book stall, upgraded announcement system, free RailWire WiFi, bottle crusher and water vending machine. Installation of CCTV camera is made at station for passenger safety.

Coach Indicator at platforms helps passengers to find there train coaches. Mobile charging point at this station is also available. Fly trapper at platform reduce from insect attack.

Big Bazaar (Mall) is opened in the vacant land of Patna Saheb station.

Tourist Information Centre is open for giving information of tourism of Bihar.

=== Platforms ===
There are three platforms (platform no. 4 proposed) which are interconnected with two foot overbridges (FOB).

== Trains ==
Many passenger and express trains serve Patna Saheb Station.

== Nearest airports ==
The nearest airports to Patna Saheb station are:

- Lok Nayak Jayaprakash Airport, Patna 15 kilometres (9.3 mi)
- Birsa Munda Airport, Ranchi 246 kilometres (153 mi)
- Gaya Airport 109 kilometres (68 mi)
- Netaji Subhash Chandra Bose International Airport, Kolkata
