= Aluabari Road Junction railway station =

Railway station in West Bengal, India

Aluabari Road
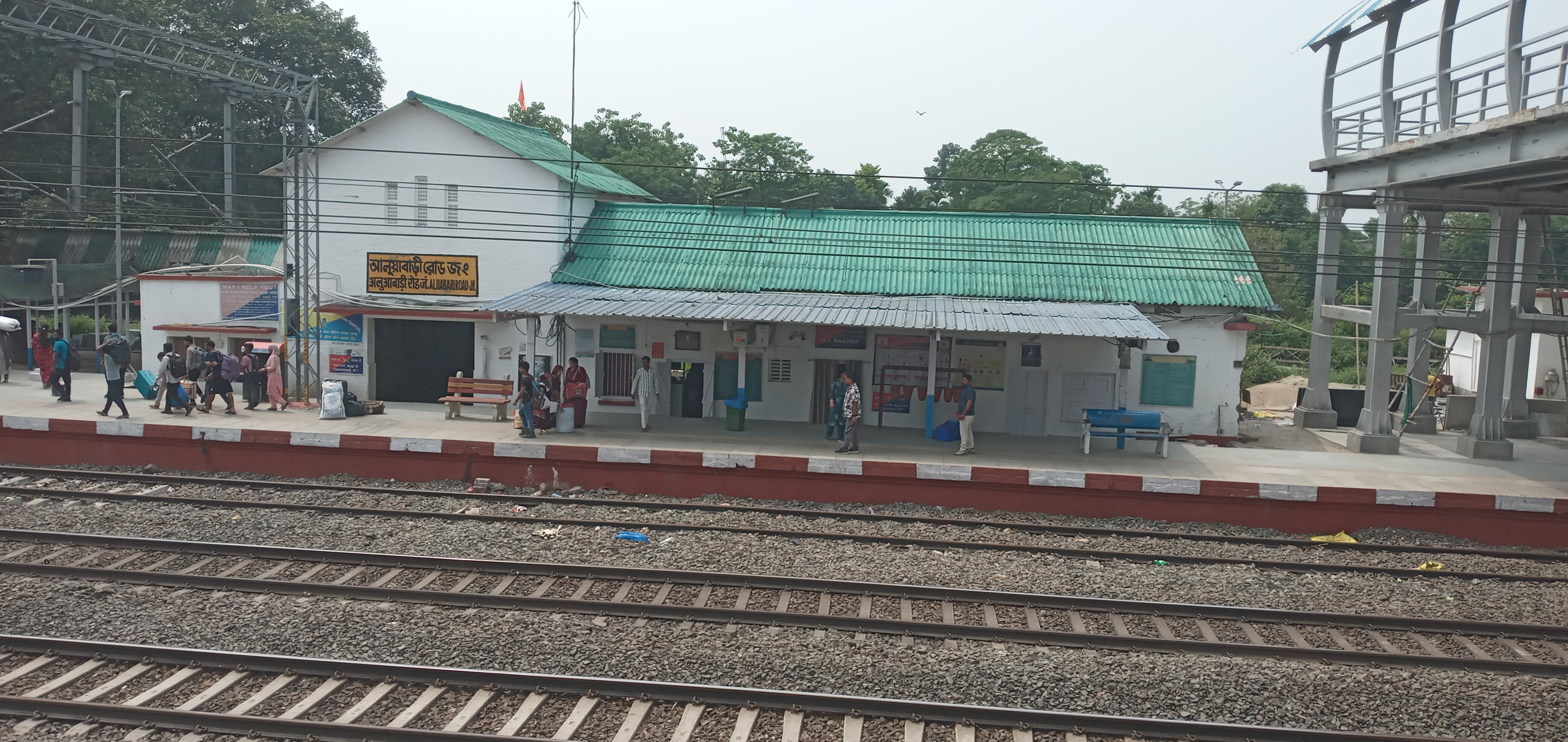

General information
- Location: National Highway 31, Islampur, Uttar Dinajpur district, West Bengal; India
- Coordinates: 26°16′11″N 88°11′08″E
- Elevation: 65.67 m (215.5 ft)
- System: Passenger train, Express train station
- Owner: Indian Railways
- Operator: Northeast Frontier Railway
- Lines: Howrah–New Jalpaiguri line, Katihar-Siliguri line, Barauni–Guwahati line
- Platforms: 2
- Tracks: 4

Construction
- Structure type: At-grade
- Parking: Available
- Accessible: Yes

Other information
- Status: Active
- Station code: AUB
- Zone(s): Northeast Frontier Railway
- Division(s): Katihar

History
- Former names: East Indian Railway Company

Services
Preceding station	Indian Railways	Following station
Dhulabari towards ?	Northeast Frontier Railway zone Katihar–Siliguri line	Gunjaria towards ?
Terminus	Northeast Frontier Railway zone Aluabari–Siliguri branch line	Pothia towards ?
Location

Aluabari Road Junction railway station is a junction station on Katihar–Siliguri branch of Howrah–New Jalpaiguri line in the Katihar railway division of Northeast Frontier Railway zone. It is situated beside National Highway 27 (India) at Islampur of Uttar Dinajpur district in the Indian state of West Bengal. This railway station connects the Aluabari–Siliguri branch line and New Farakka–New Jalpaiguri line. Total 35 express and passenger trains stop at Aluabari Road Junction railway station in a day.

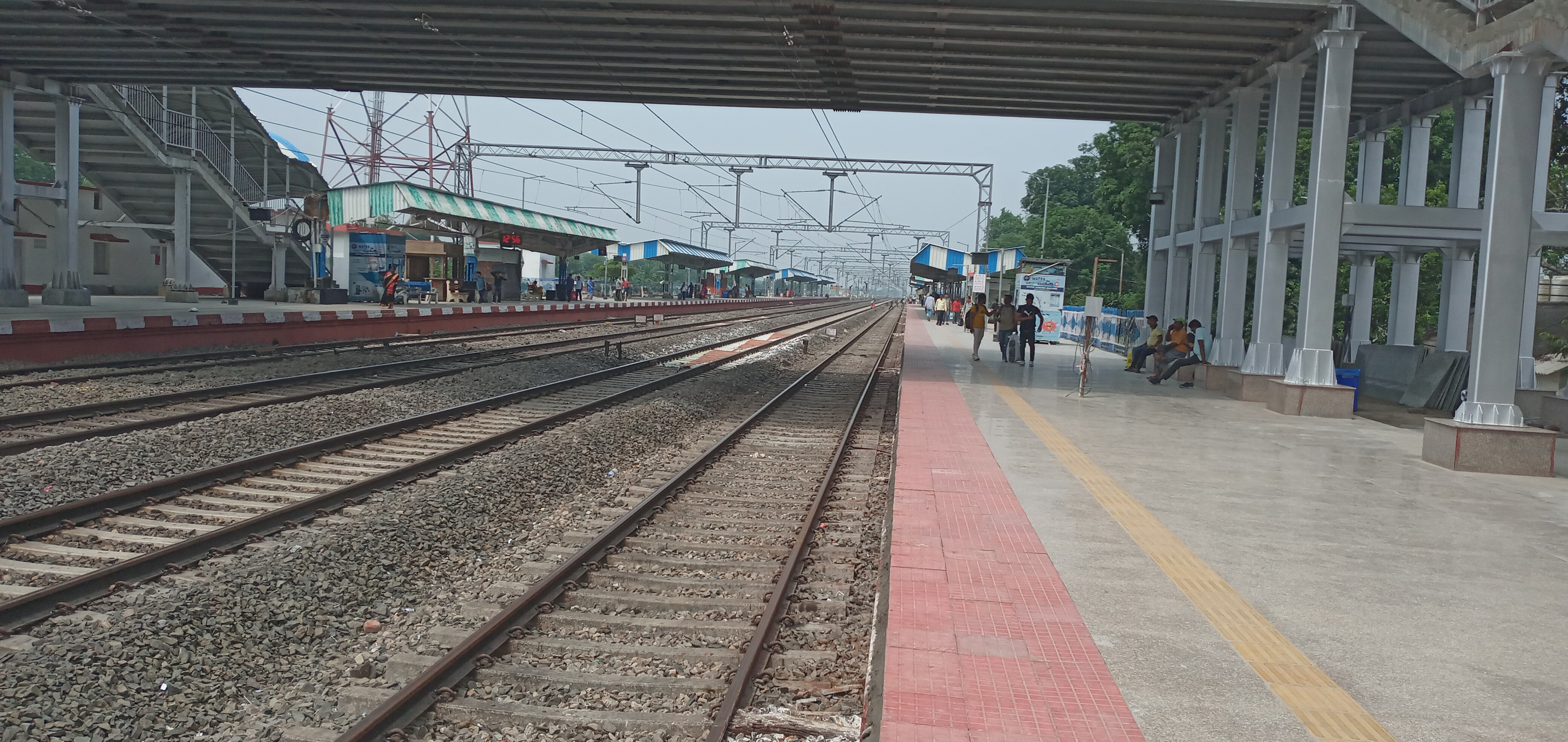
Way to Siliguri Jn and New Jalpaiguri

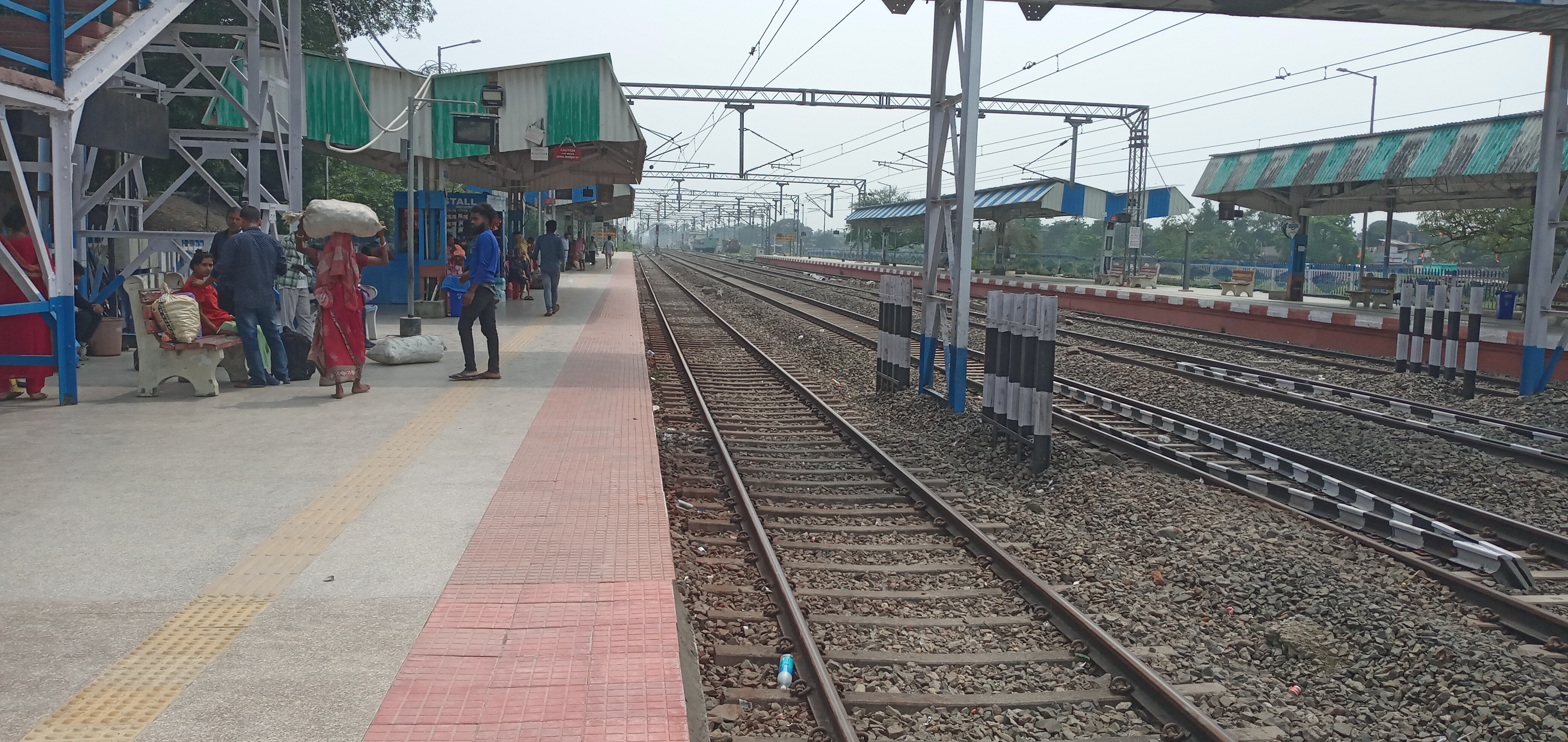
Way to Kishanganj

== Trains ==
Following trains are available from this station:

- Kamakhya–Howrah Vande Bharat Sleeper Express
- MGR Chennai Central – New Jalpaiguri Superfast Express
- Sealdah - Jalpaiguri Road Humsafar Express
- Panvel–Alipurduar Amrit Bharat Express
- SMVT Bengaluru–Alipurduar Amrit Bharat Express
- Charlapalli–Kamakhya Amrit Bharat Express
- Dibrugarh - Gomti Nagar Amrit Bharat Express
- Sealdah-Alipurduar Kanchan Kanya Express
- Dibrugarh-Lalgarh Avadh Assam Express
- Sealdah–Sabroom Kanchanjungha Express
- Delhi-Alipurduar Mahananda Express
- Balurghat–Siliguri Intercity Express
- Siliguri Town - Jogbani Intercity Express
- Siliguri - Radhikapur Express
- Katihar–Siliguri Intercity Express
- Sealdah–Silchar Kanchanjungha Express
- Dibrugarh-Howrah Kamrup Express
- Sealdah-New Alipurdiar Teesta Torsha Express
- Dibrugarh - Deogarh Express
- Sealdah-Bamanhat Uttar Banga Express
