= Katihar–Siliguri line =

Railway line in India

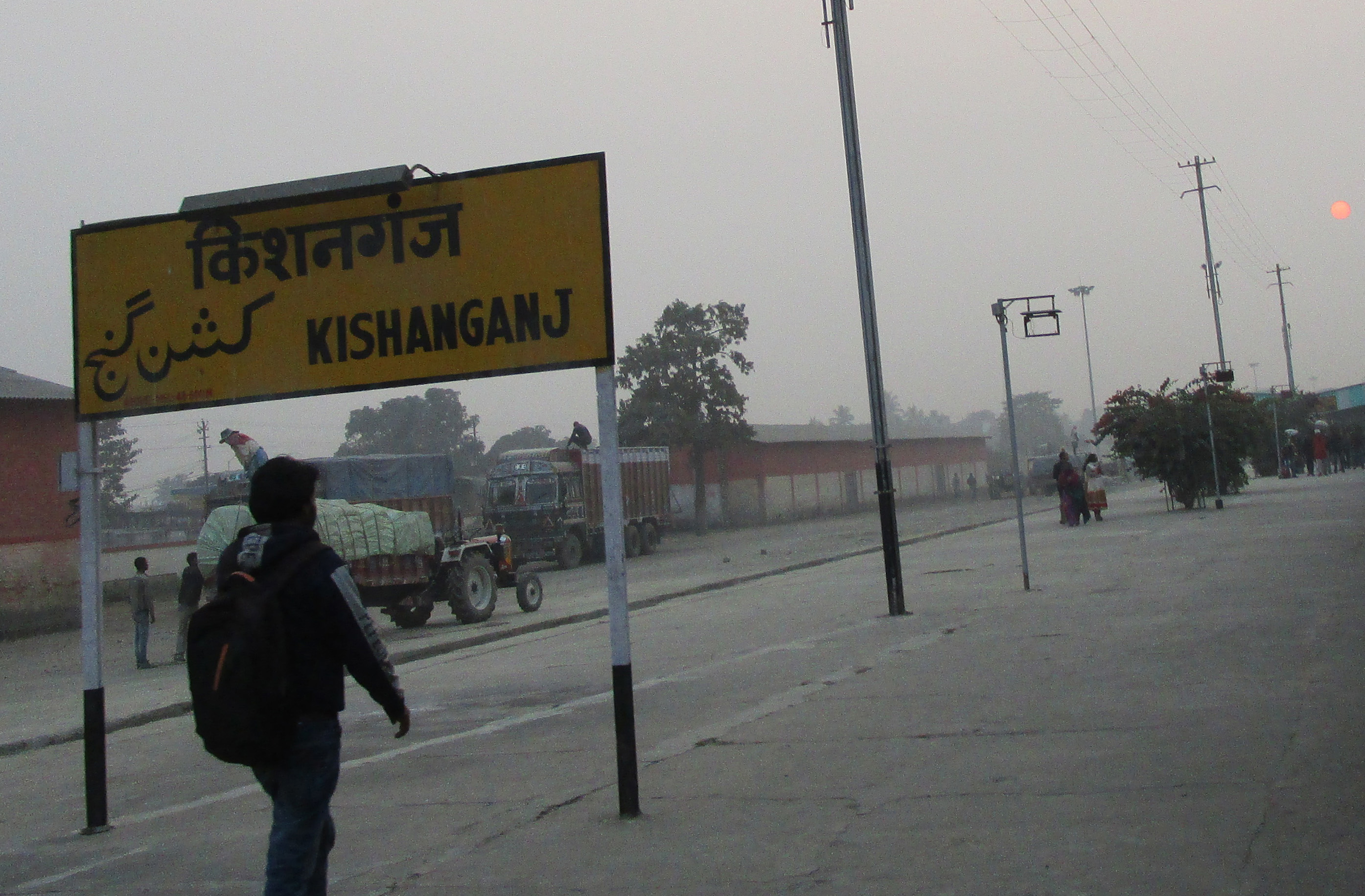
- Kishanganj Junction an Important railway station on Katihar–Siliguri line

Overview
- Status: Operational
- Owner: Indian Railways
- Locale: North Bengal–Bihar
- Termini: Katihar; Siliguri Junction
- Stations: 35

Service
- Operator: Northeast Frontier Railway

History
- Opened: 1958

Technical
- Line length: 203.7 kilometres (126.6 mi)
- Track gauge: 1,676 mm (5 ft 6 in) 5 ft 6 in (1,676 mm) broad gauge

The Katihar–Siliguri line is a railway line connecting Katihar in the Indian state of Bihar with Siliguri Junction in West Bengal, via Barsoi, Dalkhola, Kishanganj, Aluabari Road Junction, Thakurganj, Adhikari, Naxalbari, Bagdogra and Matigara. It was a metre-gauge track that was converted to 1,676 mm (5 ft 6 in) broad gauge in 2011.

Another railway line with a slightly different route with shorter distance exists between Siliguri Junction and Aluabari Road Junction (Islampur) and its details are available in Howrah–New Jalpaiguri line article.

== History ==
=== Early developments ===
Railway developments in the area started in the 1880s. East Indian Railway Company opened the Manihari–Katihar–Kasba section in 1888 and the North Bengal Railway opened the Katihar–Raiganj section the same year. The Barsoi–Kishanganj section opened in 1889. All these lines were metre-gauge lines. Darjeeling Himalayan Railway, operating narrow-gauge lines, extended their operations from Siliguri to Kishenganj in 1915.

Siliguri was connected to Calcutta (now spelt as Kolkata) via the eastern part of Bengal since 1878 (for details see Howrah–New Jalpaiguri line). However, with the partition of India in 1947, railway services in the region were completely disrupted. In 1949, the 108 kilometres (67 mi) narrow gauge Siliguri–Kishanganj section was upgraded to metre gauge. Thus there was a direct metre-gauge connection from Manihari to Siliguri via Katihar. A generally acceptable route to Siliguri was via Sahibganj loop to Sakrigali ghat. Across the Ganges by ferry to Manihari Ghat. Then metre gauge via Katihar and Barsoi to Kishanganj and finally narrow gauge to Sliguri, before Kishanganj–Siliguri was converted to metre gauge. This, therefore, remains a historic route, even though for a short period.

=== Surviving as a metre-gauge line in the broad-gauge era ===
In the sixties, new 5 ft 6 in (1,676 mm) broad gauge lines were laid in the area and in 1971 with the rail bridge over Farakka Barrage, Siliguri was once again directly connected with Calcutta (now spelt as Kolkata) by 576 kilometres (358 mi) long broad-gauge track. A section of the broad-gauge line from Mukuria to Aluabari Road ran alongside the metre-gauge line. The metre-gauge line survived for many years until 2011.

An Indian Railways Fan Club enthusiast reported (in June 2005): "Near Siliguri, a MG line emerges to the right, on a somewhat high embankment and continues to run parallel to the road. This is the Siliguri–Kishanganj–Katihar MG line which still exists. Bagdogra is a station on this line, in fact the airport's runway almost ends within station limits! Both road and rail curve northwards but then diverge with the road crossing over the railway tracks. This overpass is above the Siliguri–New Mal Junction–Alipurduar Junction–Samuktala Road line and the DHR. The former was MG in 2000 and is BG now."

=== Gauge conversion ===
The Siliguri–Katihar line was the last surviving metre-gauge line in the area. The Aluabari Road–Katihar section already had a broad-gauge line running alongside the metre-gauge line. The 76 kilometres (47 mi) long Aluabari Road–Siliguri section needed to be converted. Conversion work was taken up in 2008, train services in the section was suspended and conversion work completed early in 2011.

== Important Railway Stations ==
- Katihar Junction
- Khurial
- Azamnagar Road
- Barsoi Junction
- Sudhani
- Telta
- Dalkhola
- Kishanganj
- Aluabari Road Junction
- Pothia
- Thakurganj
- Galgalia
- Adhikari
- Batasi
- Naxalbari
- Bagdogra
- Matigara
- Siliguri Junction

== See also ==
- New Jalpaiguri–Alipurduar–Samuktala Road line
