= Mansi Junction railway station =

Railway station in Khagaria, Bihar, India

MANSI JUNCTION

- Mansi Junction

General information
- Location: NH 31, Industrial Area, Mansi, Khagaria district, Bihar; India
- Coordinates: 25.5092°N 86.5551°E
- Elevation: 42.445 metres (139.26 ft)
- System: Indian Railways station
- Owner: Indian Railways
- Operator: East Central Railways
- Lines: Barauni–Guwahati line; Barauni–Katihar section; Mansi–Saharsa line
- Platforms: 3
- Tracks: 4

Construction
- Structure type: Standard on ground
- Parking: Yes
- Accessible: Available

Other information
- Status: Functioning
- Station code: MNE
- Zone(s): East Central Railway zone
- Division(s): Sonpur

History
- Former names: East Indian Railway
Services
Preceding station	Indian Railways	Following station
East Central Railway zone
Samastipur towards Katihar Junction	Barauni–Katihar section Towards Saharsa and Purnia	Mansi towards Barauni Junction
Begusarai towards Katihar Junction	Barauni–Katihar section	Katihar towards Barauni Junction
Munger towards ?	Munger Ganga Bridge Towards Jamalpur and Bhagalpur	Terminus
Route map
Location
- Location within Bihar Location within India
- Interactive map

Mansi Junction railway station is an important railway junction located in Mansi Bazar, Khagaria district, Bihar, India. It falls under the Sonpur railway division of the East Central Railway (ECR), Indian Railways. The station serves as a major transportation point for residents of Khagaria and nearby towns and villages.

== Location and elevation ==
Mansi Junction is situated in the state of Bihar at an elevation of approximately 42 metres (138 feet) above mean sea level. Its location in the Khagaria district makes it an important railway access point for the surrounding region.

== Railway infrastructure and connectivity ==
Mansi Junction has 3 railway platforms and a double electrified railway line. The station is classified as NSG-4 and serves trains connecting passengers to various destinations across Bihar and other parts of India.

The station is conveniently accessible from the northern side near Lohiya Chowk and the rickshaw stand/UTS counter, while the southern side connects to NH 31 and Bus Stand Road in Chakhusaini, Mansi Bazar.

Mansi Junction plays a significant role in regional transportation, providing rail connectivity for daily commuters, students, workers, and long-distance travellers. It also supports local economic activity by connecting nearby communities with larger towns and cities.

The station is located approximately 9 kilometres from Khagaria Junction, with other nearby railway stations including Chedhabanni Halt, Badla Ghat, and Maheshkhunt.

Mansi Junction is an important railway facility in northeastern Bihar, helping connect Khagaria district with regional and long-distance destinations. Its strategic location, railway infrastructure, and passenger connectivity make it a valuable part of the area's transportation network.
