= Barauni–Katihar section =

Railway section in Bihar

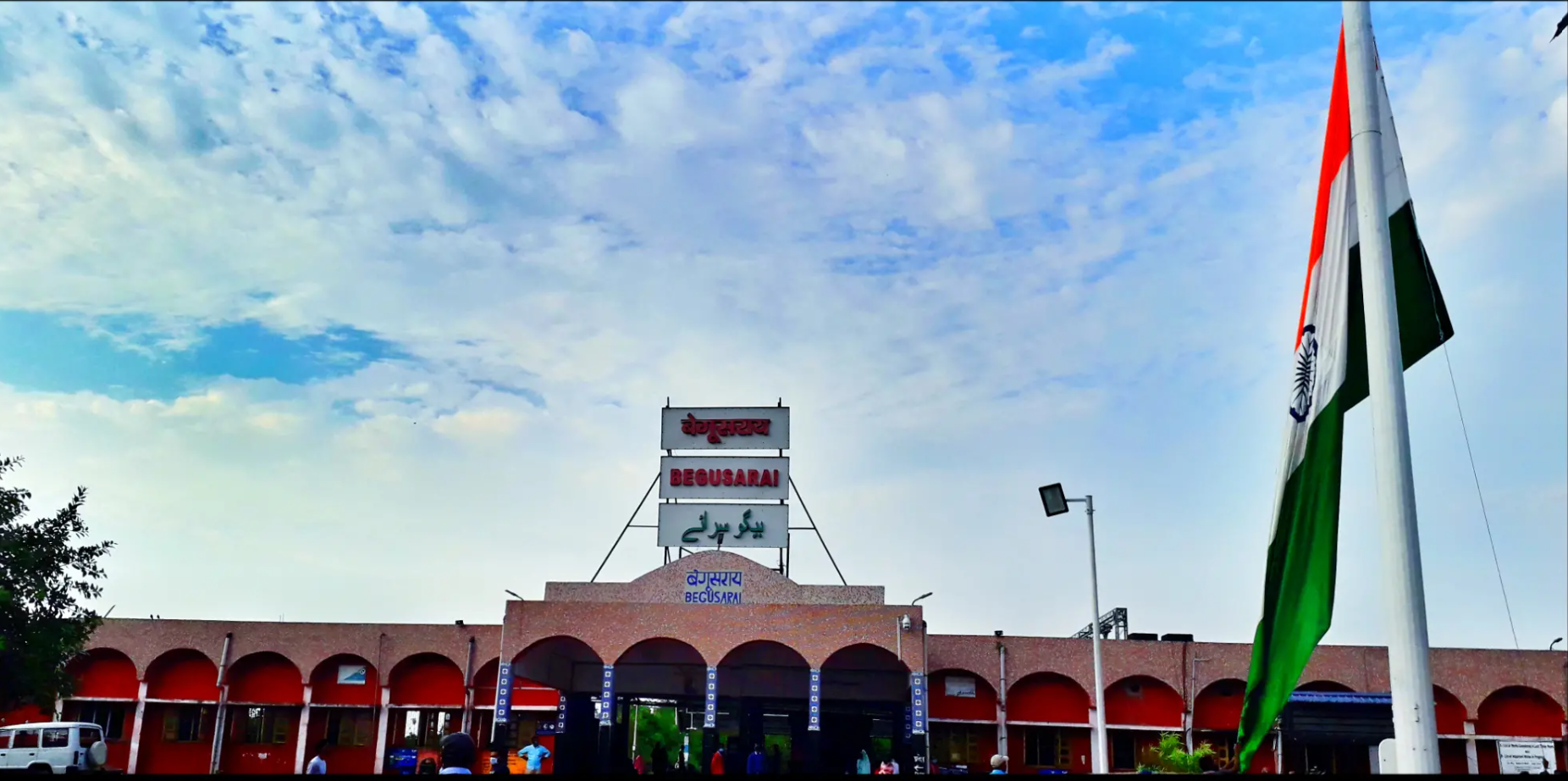
- Begusarai railway station is important station on Barauni—Katihar Section

Overview
- Status: Operational
- Owner: Indian Railways
- Locale: Bihar
- Termini: Barauni; Katihar
- Stations: 27

Service
- Services: Barauni–Katihar
- Operator(s): East Central Railway, Northeast Frontier Railway

Technical
- Line length: 185 km (115 mi)
- Track gauge: 5 ft 6 in (1,676 mm) broad gauge
- Electrification: Yes
- Operating speed: 110 km/h

The Barauni–Katihar section of the Barauni–Guwahati line connects Barauni and Katihar in the Indian state of Bihar .

== History ==
=== Early developments ===
Railway development on the northern side of the Ganges in Bihar came up soon after the opening of the Howrah–Delhi main line on the southern side of the Ganges in 1866. Several railway companies were involved – East Indian Railway, Assam Behar State Railway, and Tirhut State Railway. In his book The Indian Empire, Its People, History and Products (first published in 1886) W.W.Hunter, says "The Tirhut State Railway with its various branches intersects Northern Behar and is intended to extend to the Nepal frontier on one side and to Assam on the other." However, early developments appear to be scattered. EIR built the Katihar–Kasba and Katihar–Manihari lines in 1887. Assam Behar State Railway built the Parbatipur–Katihar line (see Barsoi–Parbatipur line) in 1889, thereby linking Assam and parts of North Bengal with Bihar. Tirhoot State Railway built some longer lines such as Samastipur–Khagaria, and added branch lines such as the 7 miles long Barauni–Semaria Ghat in 1883, the 11 miles long Thana Bihpur to Bararighat in 1901 and Khagaria to Hasanpur Road in 1915. Most of these early metre-gauge lines got interconnected in subsequent years.

=== Bridge links ===
The construction of the 2 kilometres (1.2 mi) long Rajendra Setu in 1959 provided the first opportunity to link the railway tracks on the north and south banks of the Ganges.

The 3.19 kilometres (1.98 mi) long rail-cum-road bridge located at Munger 55 km downstream of the Rajendra Setu, now under construction, will link Jamalpur station on the Sahibganj loop line of Eastern Railway to the Barauni–Katihar section of East Central Railway.

=== Railway reorganization ===
The Avadh–Tirhut Railway (successor to Tirhut State Railway) was merged with Assam Railway (successor to Eastern Bengal Railway and Assam Bengal Railway) in 1952 to create North Eastern Railway. Northeast Frontier Railway was carved out of North Eastern Railway in 1958. East Central Railway was constituted in 2002 with the Sonpur and Samastipur Divisions of North Eastern Railway, and Danapur, Mughalsarai and Dhanbad Divisions of Eastern Railway.

== Locale ==
The entire track lies on the northern side of the Ganges and traverses the Kosi basin. In Bihar, the Kosi is widely referred to as the "Sorrow of Bihar" as it has caused widespread human suffering over the centuries through flooding and frequent changes in course. Over the last 250 years, the Kosi has shifted its course over 120 kilometres (75 mi) from east to west. In August 2008, it picked up an old channel it had abandoned over a century ago near the Nepal–India border, and caused enormous damage in a wide area covering several districts. The breach in the Kosi embankment which caused the devastating flood in 2008, was repaired in 2009 and the river has since been flowing along its original course. The floods continue and threaten even the Barauni–Katihar tracks. The entire region portrays "a bleak picture of broken houses, flattened fields and ravaged lives, signs of all the havoc the previous floods and land erosion wreaked here earlier."

== Gauge conversion ==
Gauge conversion work (from metre gauge to broad gauge) in the Barauni–Katihar section was taken up in 1978–79 and completed in 1984 and inaugurated by Smt Indira Gandhi.

== Electrification ==
Electrification of the 809 kilometres (503 mi) long Barauni–Katihar–Guwahati section was sanctioned in 2008. As of 2011, work on electrification of Barabanki–Gorakhpur–Barauni–New Jalpaiguri route was in progress. Adequate funds have been provided in the budget for 2011–12 to take up work in the New Jalapiguri–New Bongaigaon–Guwahati section. The section is fully electrified. Most of the Delhi and Amritsar-bound trains run on electric locomotives. Amrapali Express was the first train to run on electric locomotive, then after Rajdhani Express, North-east Express, Purvottar Sampark Kranti Express, Seemanchal Express, Tripura Sundari Express have electric engines.
