= Begusarai railway station =

Railway station in Begusarai, Bihar, India

BEGUSARAI

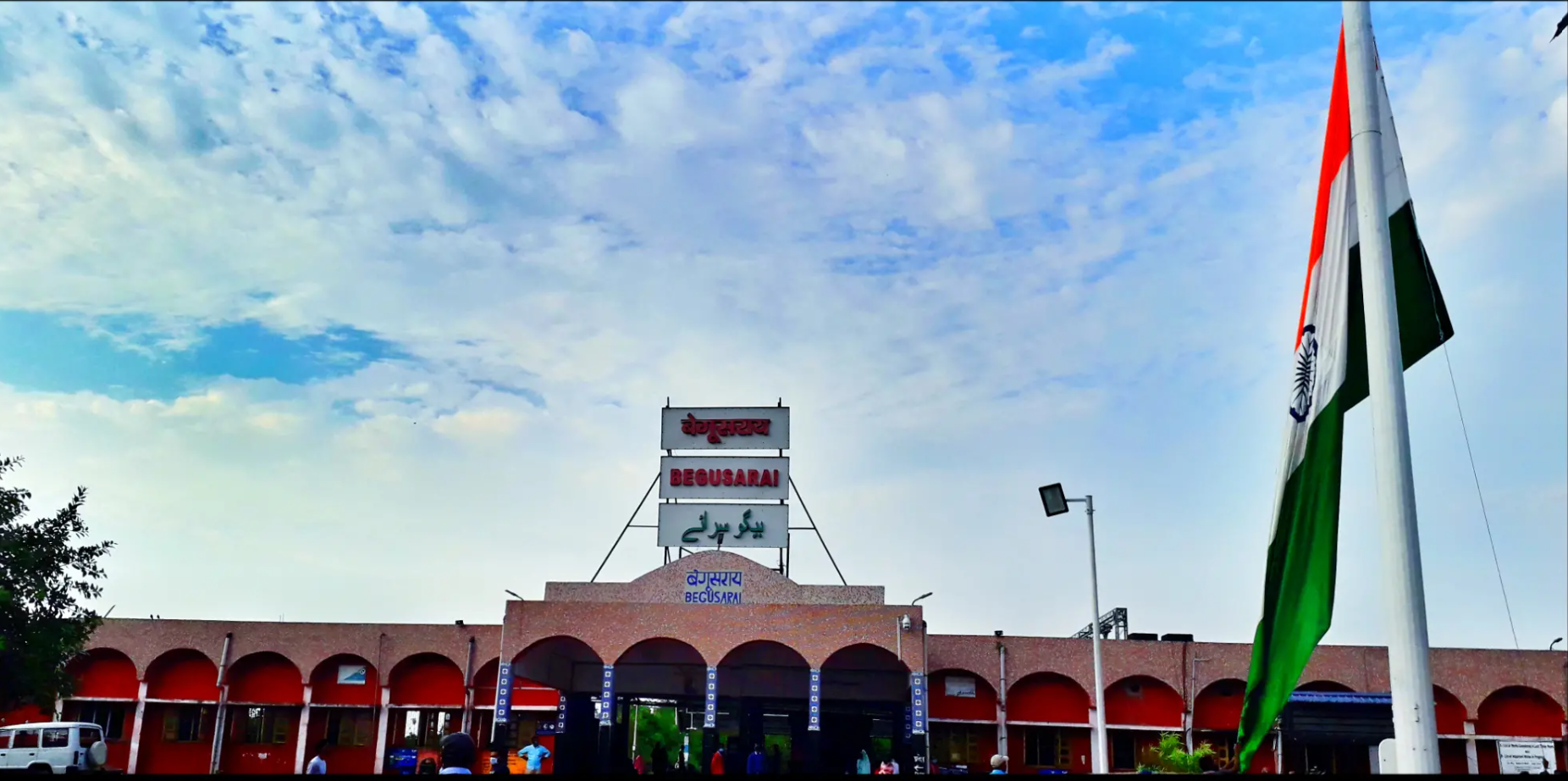

General information
- Location: NH 31, Begusarai, Bihar; India
- Coordinates: 25.4249°N 86.1342°E
- Elevation: 47 metres (154 ft)
- System: Indian Railways station
- Owner: Indian Railway
- Operator: Indian Railway
- Lines: Barauni–Katihar section; Barauni–Guwahati line; Jamalpur line
- Platforms: 3
- Tracks: 5

Construction
- Structure type: Standard (on-ground station)
- Parking: Yes

Other information
- Status: Functioning
- Station code: BGS
- Zone(s): East Central Railway
- Division(s): Sonpur

History
- Rebuilt: No
- Electrified: 2016
- Former names: East Indian Railway
Route map
Location
- Location within Bihar Location within India
- Interactive map

Begusarai railway station (code BGS) is a railway station in the Sonpur division of East Central Railway.

The major facilities available are waiting rooms, a computerized reservation facility, and vehicle parking. The vehicles are allowed to enter the station premises. The station also has an STD/ISD/PCO telephone booth, toilets, tea stalls, fruit stall, dairy stall, meal stall and book stall. The station has a total of three platforms that are interconnected with two foot over bridges. Several electrified local passenger trains and express trains run from Begusarai Railway Station.

Barauni Junction to neighbouring destinations such as Katihar, Munger, Saharsa, Purnia, New Jalpaiguri among others.
