= Barauni Junction railway station =

Railway station in Begusarai, Bihar, India

BARAUNI JUNCTION

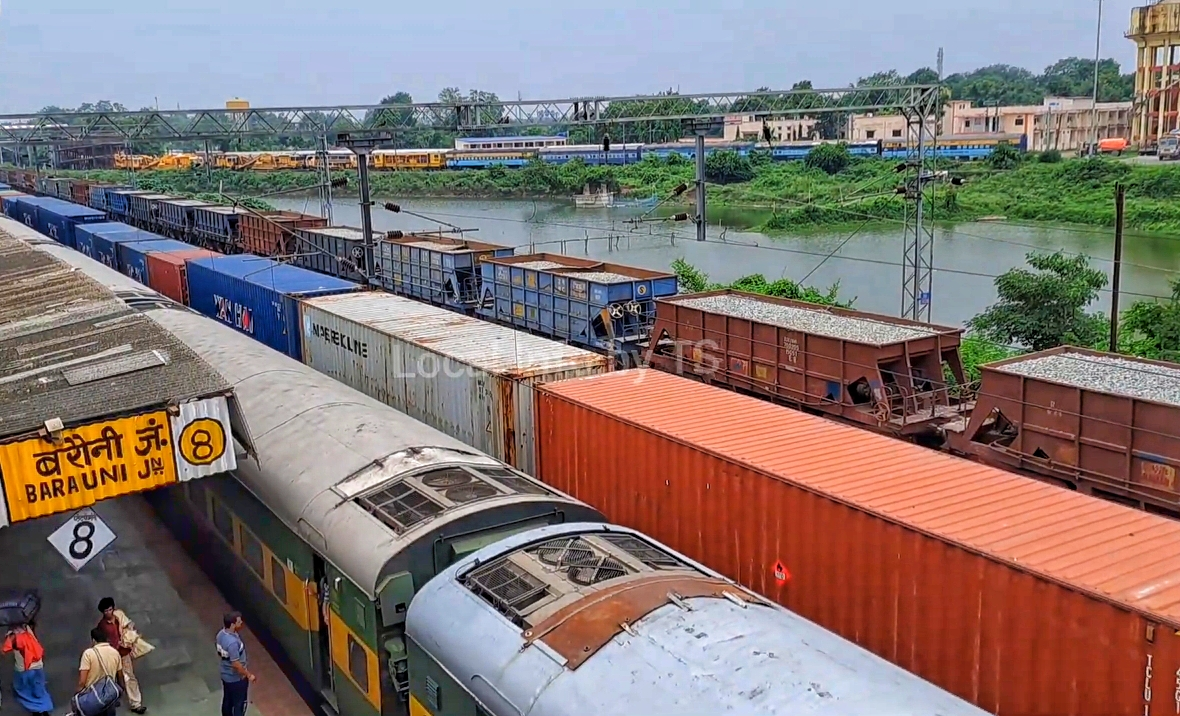
- Barauni Junction Railway Station

General information
- Location: Barauni, Begusarai district, Bihar; India
- Coordinates: 25°27′44″N 85°59′17″E
- Elevation: 48 metres (157 ft)
- System: Indian Railways station
- Owner: Indian Railways
- Operator: East Central Railways
- Lines: Barauni–Mokama section, Barauni—Lakhisarai section, Barauni–Katihar section, Barauni–Samastipur section, Barauni–Guwahati line, Barauni–Raxaul and Jainagar Lines, Barauni–Gorakhpur line, Barauni–Hajipur Chord line; Barauni–Lakhisarai–Howrah line, Barauni–Mokama–Patna line
- Platforms: 9
- Tracks: 15
- Connections: Hajipur Junction; Kiul Junction; Patna Junction; Katihar Junction; Samastipur Junction

Construction
- Structure type: Standard (on-ground station)
- Parking: Yes
- Accessible: Available

Other information
- Status: Functioning
- Station code: BJU
- Zone(s): East Central Railway zone
- Division(s): Sonpur

History
- Opened: 1 May 1883; 143 years ago
- Electrified: 2001–02
- Former names: East Indian Railway
Route map
Location
- Location within India Location within Bihar
- Interactive map of Barauni Junction

Barauni Junction railway station (station code BJU), is a railway station in the Sonpur division of East Central Railway. Barauni Junction is located in Barauni city in Begusarai district in the Indian state of Bihar. ]

== History ==
In February 2012, the Indian Railways had planned to set up a company named Indian Railway Stations Development Corporation (IRSDC) that will work on improving the major railway stations including Muzaffarpur Junction by building and developing Restaurants, shopping areas and food plaza for commercial business and improving passenger amenities.

== Facilities ==
The major facilities available are waiting rooms, computerized reservation facility and vehicle parking. The vehicles are allowed to enter the station premises. The station also has STD/ISD/PCO telephone booth, toilets, tea stall, fruit stall, dairy stall, meal stall and book stall.

=== Platforms ===
Barauni Junction has 9 Platforms. The platforms are interconnected by two foot overbridges.

== Electric Loco Shed, Barauni ==
Electric Loco Shed, Barauni is an engine shed for the repair and maintenance of electric locomotives of the Indian Railways, located at Barauni, Begusarai district of the East Central Railway zone in Bihar, India. It falls under the Sonpur railway division. It is Bihar's first electric locomotive maintenance shed.

Prime Minister Narendra Modi inaugurated the locomotive shed in September 2020. It can accommodate over 200 locomotives.

| SN | Locomotives | HP | Quantity |
|---|---|---|---|
| 1. | WAP-7 | 6350 | 6 |
| 2. | WAG-9 | 6120 | 194 |
| Total Locomotives Active as of January 2026 | | | 200 |

Barauni WAG-9 At Ludhiana Junction

== Nearest airports ==
The nearest airports to Barauni Junction are

- Darbhanga Airport, Darbhanga, 112 kilometres (70 mi)
- Jay Prakash Narayan Airport, Patna 127 kilometres (79 mi)
- Gaya Airport 147 kilometres (91 mi)
