= Chapramari railway station =

Railway station in West Bengal

Chapramari Railway Station

General information
- Location: Chapramari, Dist - Jalpaiguri State: West Bengal; India
- Coordinates: 26.8938°N 88.8675°E
- Elevation: 207 metres (679 ft)
- System: Indian Railways Station
- Owner: Indian Railways
- Operator: Northeast Frontier Railway zone
- Line: New Jalpaiguri–Alipurduar–Samuktala Road line
- Platforms: 1
- Tracks: 1 (broad gauge)

Construction
- Parking: Available

Other information
- Status: Functioning
- Station code: CPMR
- Zone(s): Northeast Frontier Railway zone
- Division(s): Alipurduar
Location
- Location within West Bengal Location within India

Chapramari Railway Station is a small railway station which serves the areas of Chapramari–Doars region in the Indian state of West Bengal. The station lies on New Jalpaiguri–Alipurduar–Samuktala Road line of Northeast Frontier Railway zone, Alipurduar railway division. Due to its location inside Chapramari Wildlife Sanctuary, no trains have stoppages here. The passengers of these areas have to go to nearby Chalsa and Nagrakata stations to board trains.
