= Mujnai railway station =

Railway station in West Bengal, India

Mujnai Railway Station

General information
- Location: NH 31C, Mujnai, Chapaguri, PS - Madarihat, Pin - 735204, Dist - Alipurduar State: West Bengal; India
- Coordinates: 26.7270°N 89.2443°E
- Elevation: 95 metres (312 ft)
- System: Indian Railways Station
- Owner: Indian Railways
- Operator: Northeast Frontier Railway zone
- Line: New Jalpaiguri–Alipurduar–Samuktala Road line
- Platforms: 1
- Tracks: 2 (broad gauge)

Construction
- Parking: Available

Other information
- Status: Functioning
- Station code: MJE
- Zone(s): Northeast Frontier Railway zone
- Division(s): Alipurduar
Location
- Location within West Bengal Location within India

Mujnai railway station is the railway station which serves the town of Sishubari, along with tea gardens like Mujnai, Chapaguri, Gopalpur, Dumchi, Khairbari, Ramjhora in Alipurduar district in the Indian state of West Bengal. It lies in the New Jalpaiguri–Alipurduar–Samuktala Road line of Northeast Frontier Railway zone, Alipurduar railway division. Local trains along with some important trains like Siliguri–Alipurduar Intercity Express etc. are available at this station.
