= New Jalpaiguri–Alipurduar Tourist Express =

Express trains with Vistadome carriages

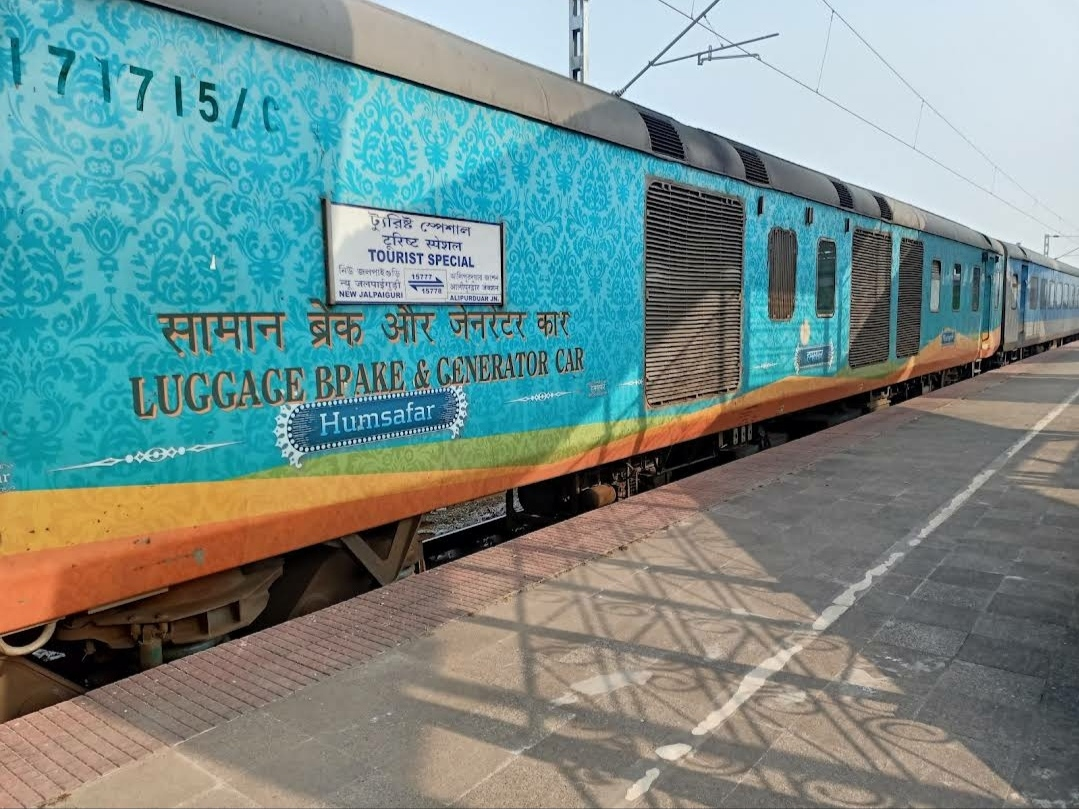
- New Jalpaiguri Alipurduar Tourist Express

Overview
- Service type: Express
- Locale: West Bengal
- First service: 28 August 2021
- Current operator: Northeast Frontier Railways

Route
- Termini: New Jalpaiguri Junction; Alipurduar Junction
- Stops: 07
- Distance travelled: 168 km (104 mi)
- Average journey time: 5 hrs 40 mins
- Service frequency: Daily
- Train number: 15777 / 15778

On-board services
- Class: Chair Car(CC)-02, Second Sitting (2S)-02 Vistadome (EC)-02 EOG-02
- Seating arrangements: Yes
- Sleeping arrangements: No
- Catering facilities: Available
- Baggage facilities: Available

Technical
- Rolling stock: LHB coach
- Track gauge: 1,676 mm (5 ft 6 in) broad gauge
- Operating speed: Avg. Speed – 29km/hr

New Jalpaiguri–Alipurduar Tourist Express is the tourist Express trains in India that runs between New Jalpaiguri Junction and Alipurduar Junction in the Indian state of West Bengal. The train belongs to the Northeast Frontier Railway zone of Indian Railways. The service was officially started from 28 August 2021 from New Jalpaiguri. The train provides awesome sceneries of the beautiful Dooars region which includes Mahananda Wildlife Sanctuary, Sevoke Railway Bridge, River Teesta, River Jaldhaka, River Torsha, Dooars-Terai tea gardens, Buxa Tiger Reserve, Jaldapara National Park, Chapramari Wildlife Sanctuary, Rajabhatkhawa, etc. The passengers travelling by this train would also get to see the mesmerizing view of Sub-Himalayas, the glaciated rivers such as Teesta, Torsha, Daina river, Jaldhaka, Kuji Daina, Dima river, etc. The train will also cover many little villages, towns, etc. One of this train's stoppage is Hasimara Railway Station, which lies near the border of Bhutan. The passengers would also get to see views of Jayanti Hills, Sevoke, Chalsa, Terai–Duar savanna and grasslands and Malbazar. The passengers would also be entertained by dance performed by locals at some specific stations like Chalsa and Hasimara. There is also a selfie point in the Vistadome Coach. The train will cover three districts, which are Jalpaiguri District, Darjeeling District and Alipurduar District.

== Locomotive ==
The train is hauled by WAP-7 Locomotive of Siliguri Locomotive Shed from New Jalpaiguri to Alipurduar Junction and vice versa.

== Coach composition ==
15777/15778 Alipurduar - New Jalpaiguri /New Jalpaiguri - Alipurduar Tourist Express consists of Two General Class (GS) coaches, One AC Chair Car (CC) coach, One Executive Vistadome (EC) class, Engine and One End On Generator (EOG) coach.

== Stops ==
- New Jalpaiguri (Starts)
- Siliguri Junction
- Gulma
- Sevoke Junction
- New Malbazar Junction
- Chalsa Railway Station
- Nagrakata railway station
- Banarhat railway station
- Binnaguri railway station
- Dalgaon railway station
- Madarihat railway station
- Hasimara railway station
- Kalchini railway station
- Rajabhatkhawa railway station
- Alipurduar Junction (Ends)

== See also ==
- Siliguri Junction–Rangtong–Siliguri Evening Safari
