= Hasimara railway station =

Railway station in West Bengal, India

Hasimara

General information
- Location: Jaigaon Road, Hasimara, West Bengal; India
- Coordinates: 26.7309°N 89.3506°E
- Elevation: 109.00 metres (357.61 ft)
- System: Indian Railways Station
- Owner: Indian Railways
- Operator: Northeast Frontier Railway zone
- Line: New Jalpaiguri–Alipurduar–Samuktala Road line
- Platforms: 2
- Tracks: 4 (broad gauge)

Construction
- Structure type: At grade
- Parking: Available

Other information
- Status: Functioning
- Station code: HSA
- Zone(s): Northeast Frontier Railway zone
- Division(s): Alipurduar
Location
- Location within West Bengal Location within India

Hasimara railway station is on New Jalpaiguri–Alipurduar–Samuktala Road line and serves the town of Hasimara and Jaigaon in Alipurduar district in the Indian state of West Bengal.

== Location ==
This railway station is the closest railway station from Bhutan. The town of Phuntsholing in Bhutan is just 18 kilometres away from Hasimara Railway Station. This railway station lies on NJP Alipurduar line which is an active elephant corridor.

== Trains ==
Major trains running from Hasimara railway station are as follows:

- Panvel–Alipurduar Amrit Bharat Express
- SMVT Bengaluru–Alipurduar Amrit Bharat Express
- New Jalpaiguri–Alipurduar Tourist Express.
- Lokmanya Tilak Terminus–Kamakhya Karmabhoomi Express.
- Dr. Ambedkar Nagar–Kamakhya Express
- Delhi-Alipurduar Mahananda Express
- Alipurduar - Secunderabad Express
- Sealdah-Alipurduar Kanchan Kanya Express
- Kamakhya–Arrah Junction Capital Express
- Ranchi–Kamakhya Express
- Siliguri–Alipurduar Intercity Express
- Siliguri Bamanhat Intercity Express.
- Siliguri–Dhubri Intercity Express

== Administration ==
This railway station also serves the town of Jaigaon. and lies under Alipurduar railway division of Northeast Frontier Railway zone.
