= Kanchan Kanya Express =

Train in India

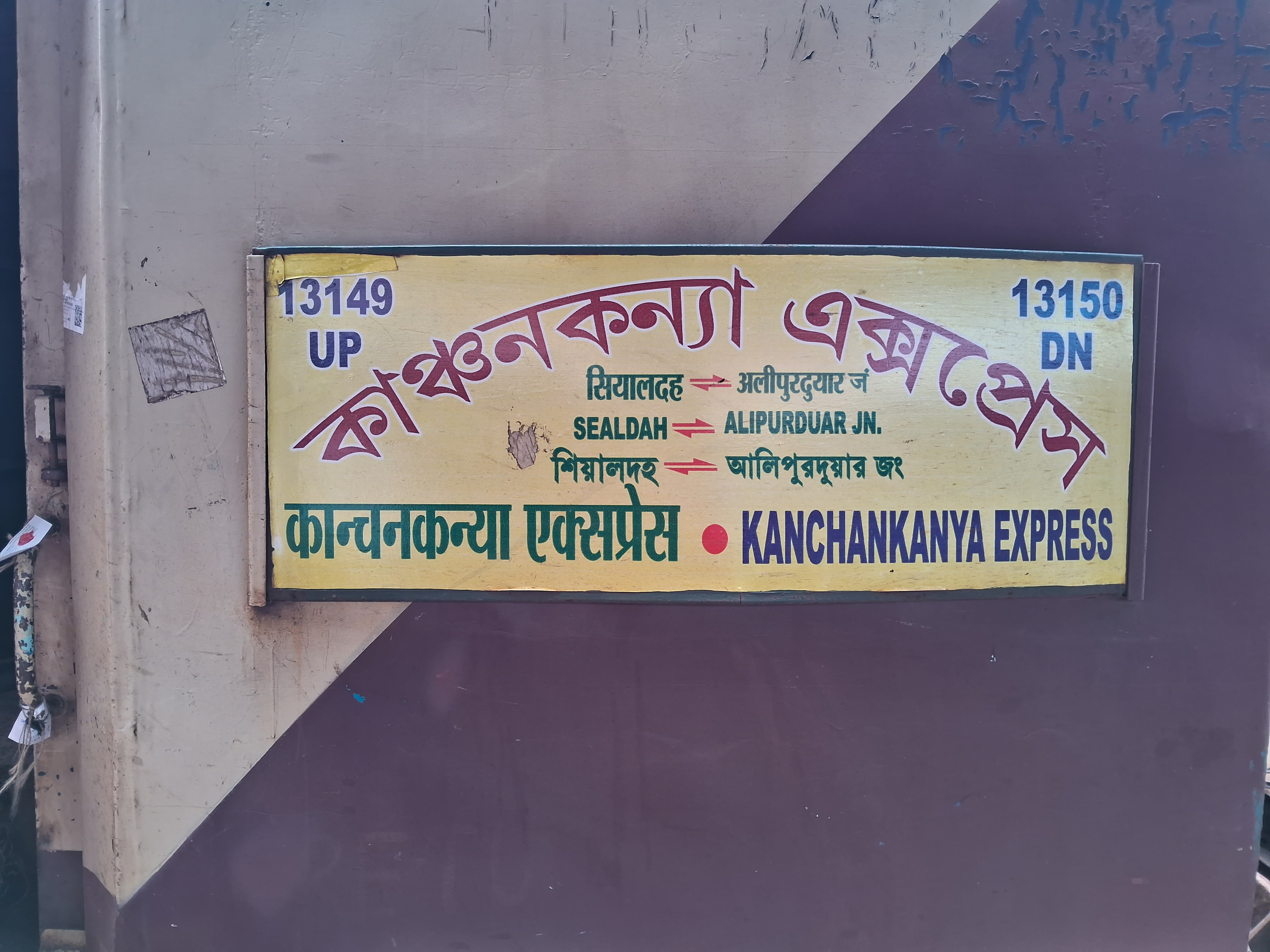
- Train board of Kanchan Kanya Express in ICF era.

Overview
- Service type: Express
- Locale: West Bengal, Jharkhand & Bihar
- First service: April 14, 2000
- Current operator: Eastern Railways

Route
- Termini: Sealdah (SDAH); Alipurduar (APDJ)
- Distance travelled: 753 km (468 mi)
- Service frequency: Daily
- Train number: 13149 / 13150

On-board services
- Seating arrangements: Yes
- Sleeping arrangements: Yes
- Catering facilities: On-board catering, E-catering
- Observation facilities: Large windows
- Baggage facilities: Available

Technical
- Rolling stock: LHB coach
- Track gauge: 1,676 mm (5 ft 6 in)
- Operating speed: 130 km/h (81 mph) maximum.

The 13149 / 13150 Kanchan Kanya Express is an Express train belonging to the Eastern Railways. It runs between Sealdah, in the city of Kolkata, and Alipurduar Junction via Barddhaman, Rampurhat, Malda Town, Siliguri and New Mal Jn.

== Coach composition ==
The train runs with 21 Linke-Hoffman Busch coaches, consisting of General (GEN), Sleeper (SL), Third AC Economy (3E) , (Note: These coaches use the "M" prefix.) Third AC (3A), Second AC (2A) and First AC (1A) classes. It has two dedicated rakes. The primary maintenance is executed at Sealdah.

Legends
EOG/SLR	PC	MIL	H	A	HA	B	AB	G	K	E	C	S	D	GEN/UR
Generator cum luggage van	Pantry car or Hot buffet car	Military coach	First AC (1A)	Second AC (2A)	First AC cum Second AC	Third AC (3A)	Third AC cum Second AC	Third AC economy (3E)	Anubhuti coach (K)	Executive chair car (EC)	AC Chair car (CC)	Sleeper class (SL)	Second seating (2S)	General or Unreserved
	Loco and other service coach													
	AC coach													
	Non-AC coach													

Coach position of 13149 (ex. Sealdah)

Loco	1	2	3	4	5	6	7	8	9	10	11	12	13	14	15	16	17	18	19	20	21
	SLR	GEN	GEN	S1	S2	S3	S4	S5	M1	M2	M3	B1	B2	B3	H1	A1	A2	A3	GEN	GEN	EOG

Coach position of 13150 (ex. Alipurduar Junction)

Loco	1	2	3	4	5	6	7	8	9	10	11	12	13	14	15	16	17	18	19	20	21
	SLR	GEN	GEN	S1	S2	S3	S4	S5	M1	M2	M3	B1	B2	B3	H1	A1	A2	A3	GEN	GEN	EOG

Note that the train reverses its direction at Siliguri Junction. So the coach positions of all stations after Siliguri will be the exact opposite of what is given here. Passengers are advised to check the coach position indicator at the station before boarding. Also, the SLR coach of this train is reserved for ladies.

== Service ==
- The 13149 Kanchan Kanya Express leaves Sealdah at 20:35 hrs everyday and reaches Alipurduar Junction the next day at 12:35 hrs. It takes 16 hours to reach its desitination with an average speed of 47 km/h (29 mph).
- The 13150 Kanchan Kanya Express leaves Alipurduar Junction at 15:15 hrs everyday and reaches Sealdah the next day at 08:20 hrs. This return journey is completed in 17 hours 5 minutes with an average speed of 44 km/h (27 mph).
- During its journey, this train runs through the picturesque Dooars region of West Bengal between Siliguri Junction and Alipurduar Junction.

== Gallery ==
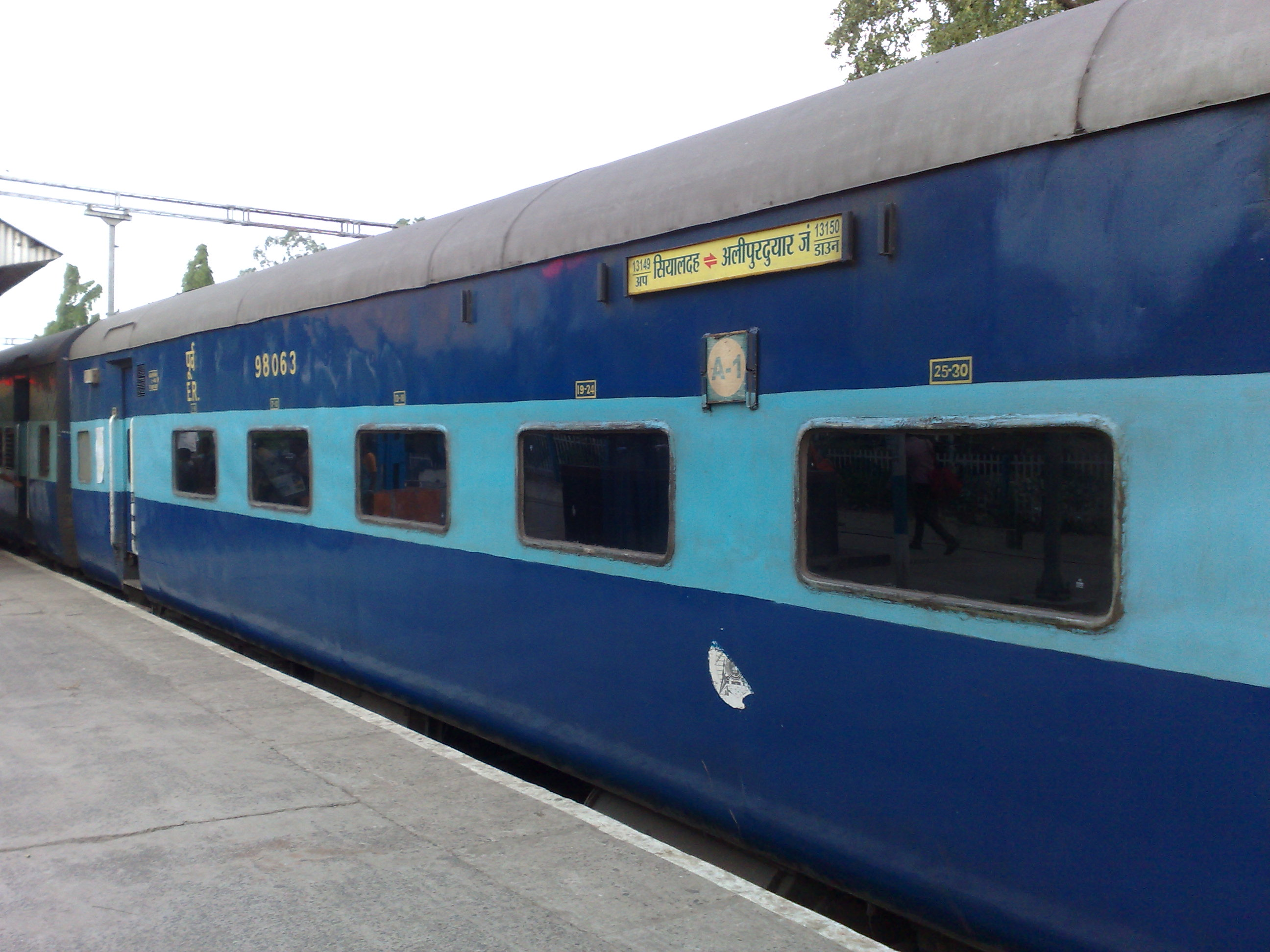
Kanchan Kanya Express ICF AC 2 tier

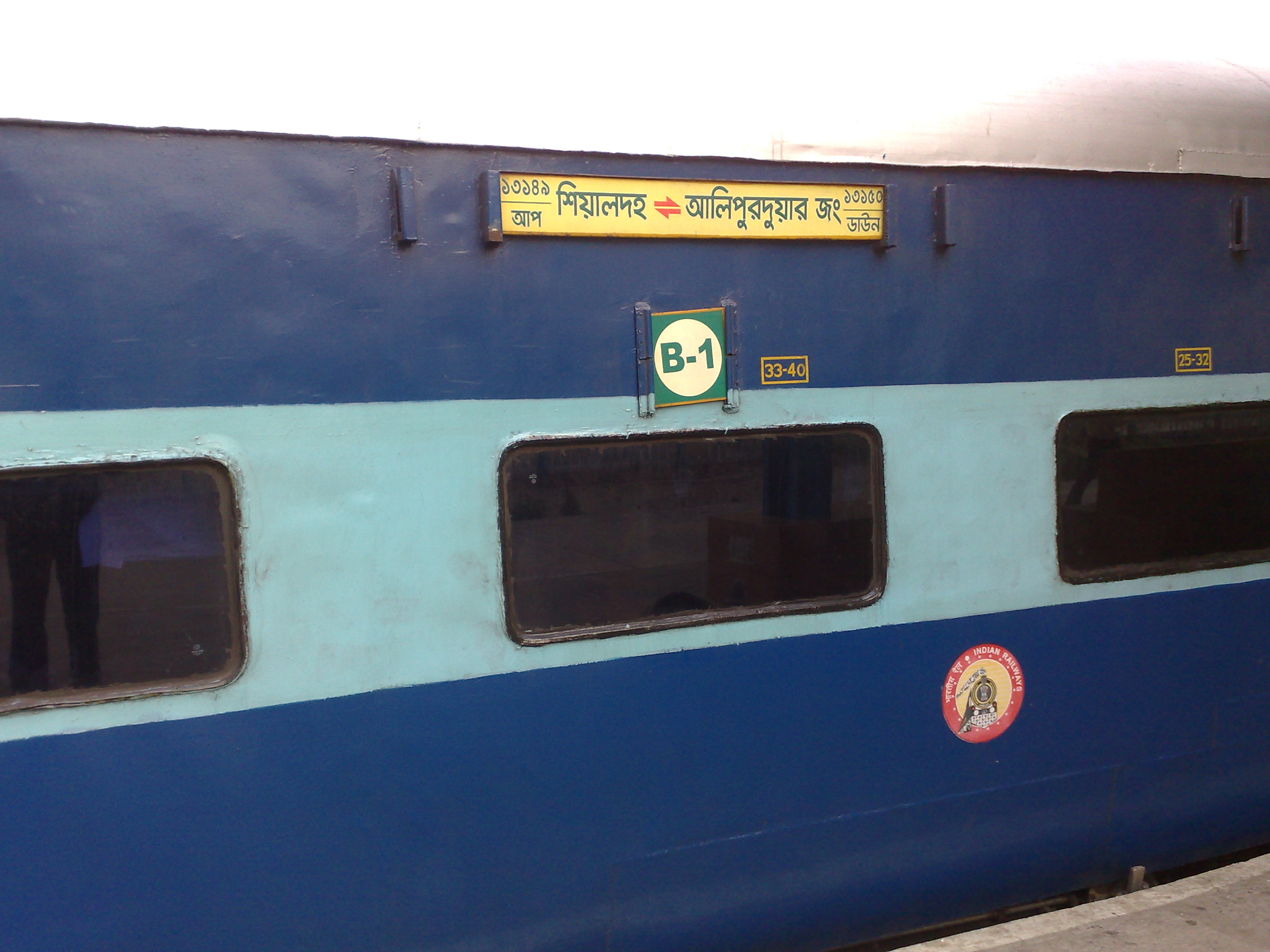
Kanchan Kanya Express ICF AC 3 tier

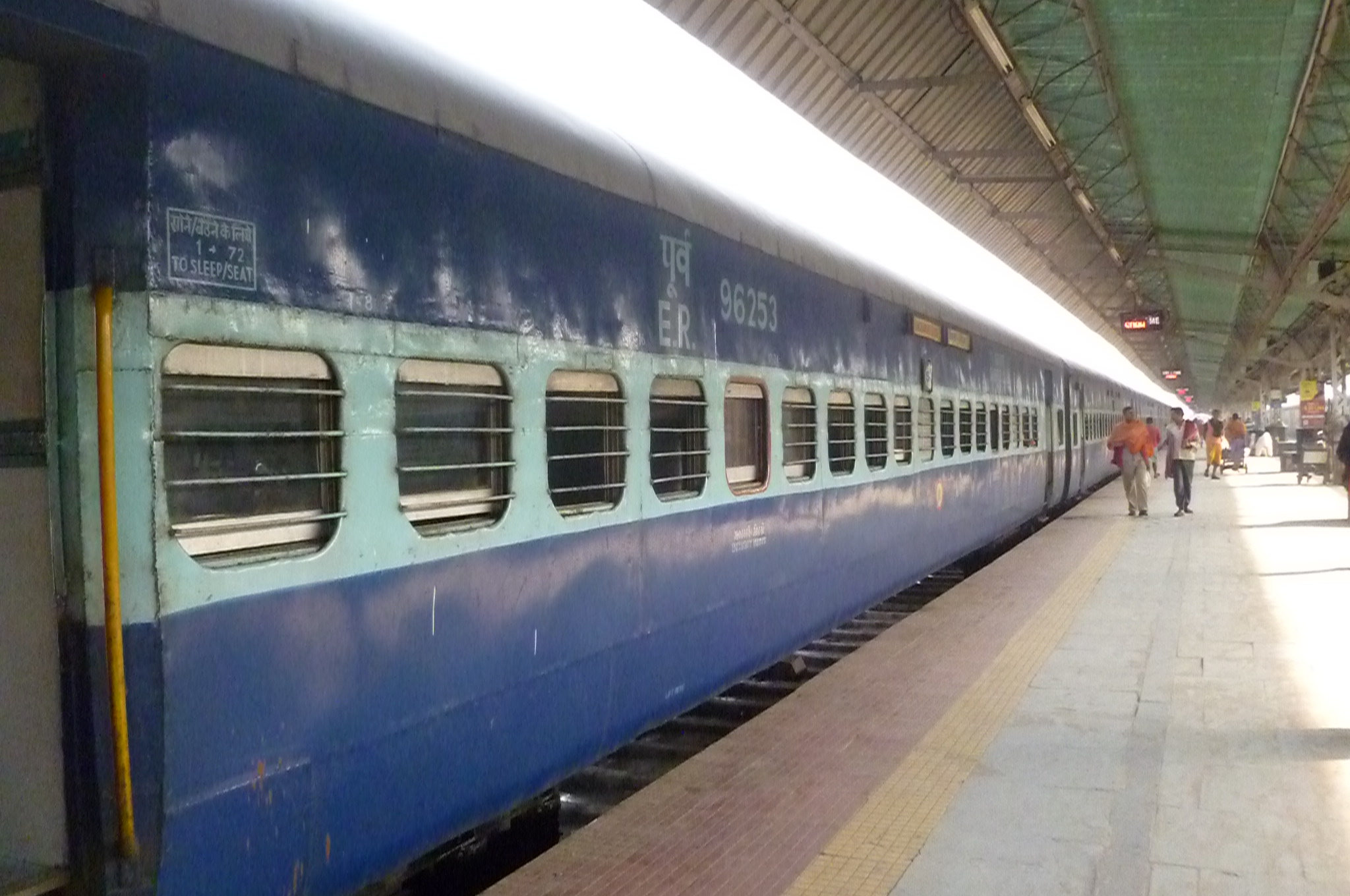
Kanchan Kanya Express ICF Sleeper class coach

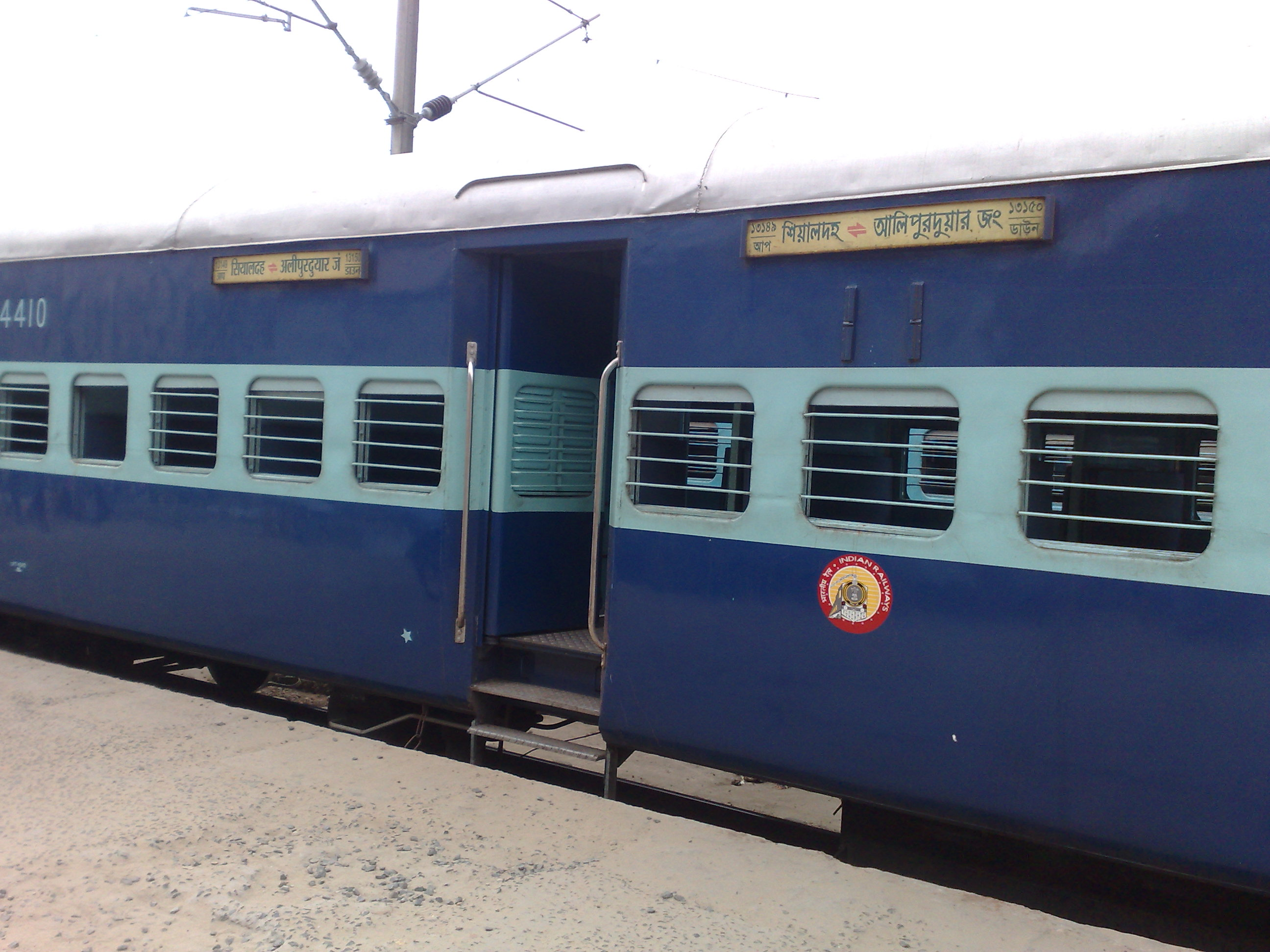
Kanchan Kanya Express ICF Second class coach

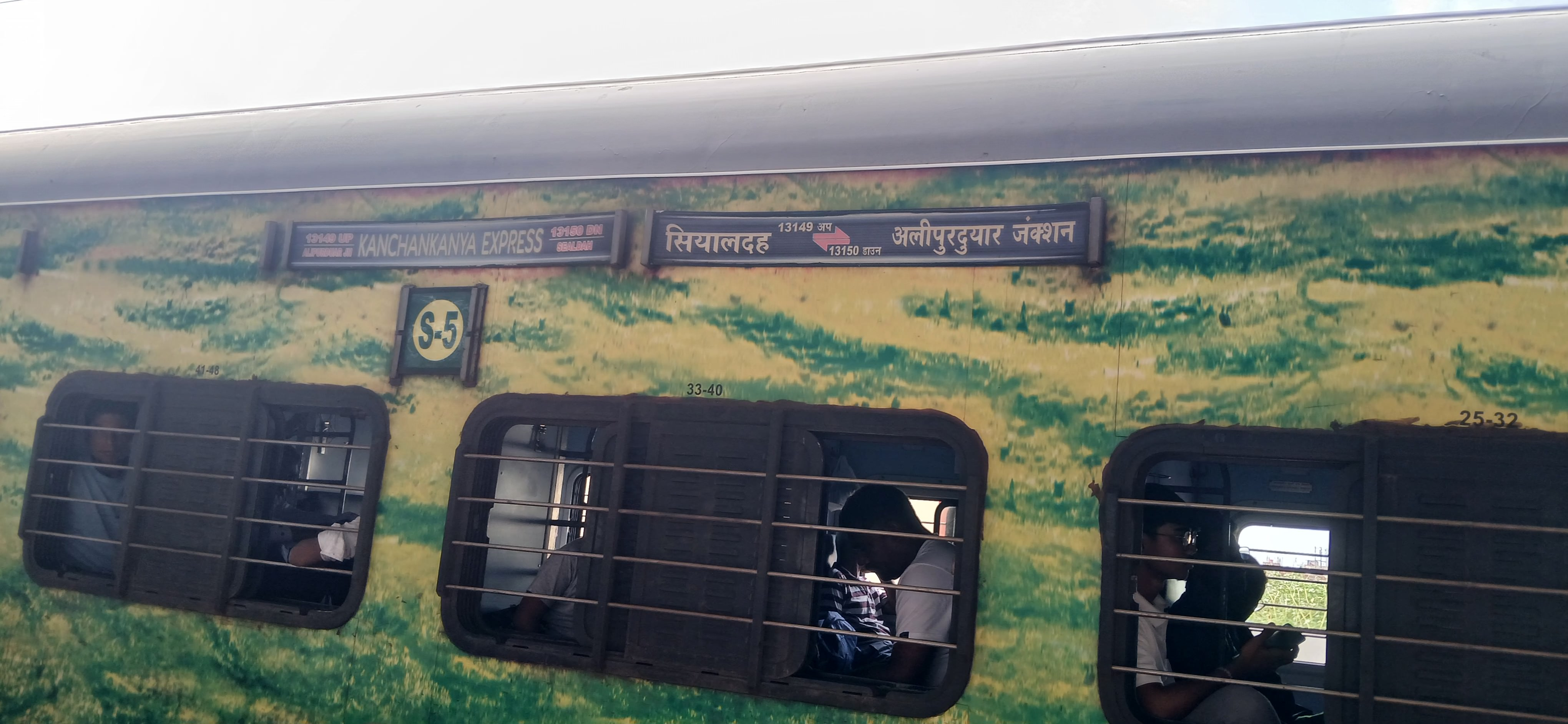
LHB sleeper class coach of Kanchan Kanya Express

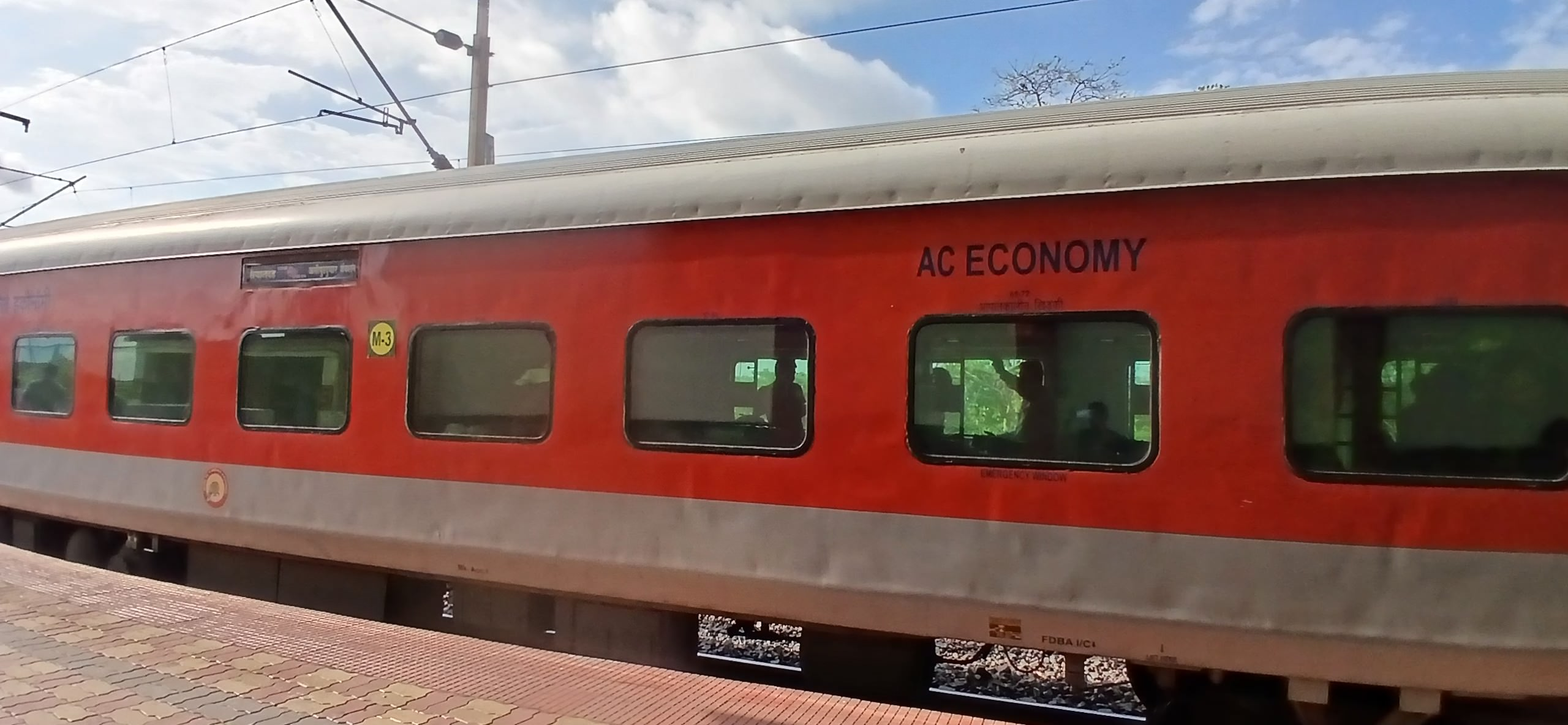
Third AC Economy coach of Kanchan Kanya Express.

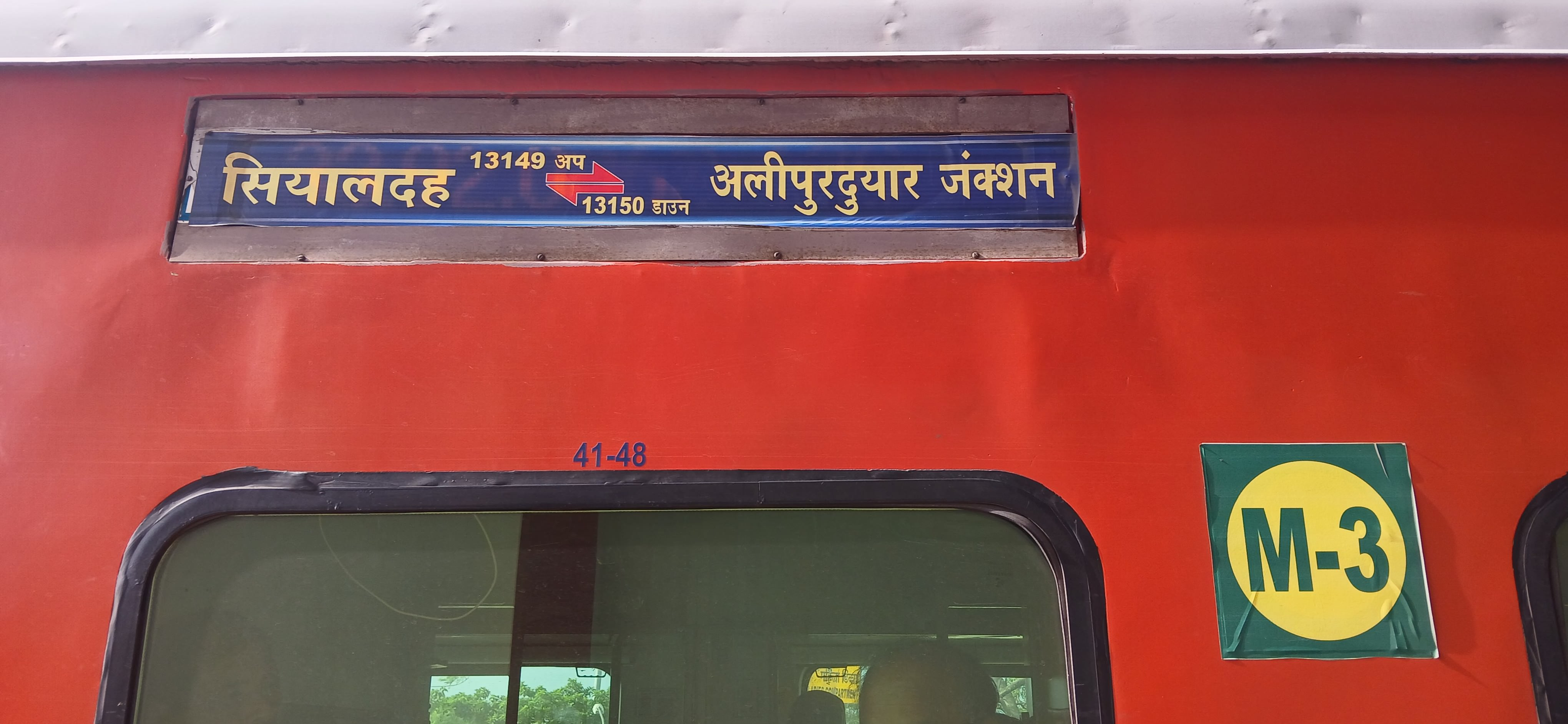
Small train board of Kanchan Kanya Express

== Route and halts ==
The stoppages are:-

1. Sealdah
2. Bidhannagar Road
3. Dakshineswar
4. Kamarkundu
5. Barddhaman Junction
6. Bolpur Shantiniketan
7. Ahmadpur Junction
8. Sainthia Junction
9. Rampurhat Junction
10. Pakur
11. New Farakka Junction
12. Malda Town
13. Bhaluka Road
14. Harischandrapur
15. Barsoi Junction
16. Dalkhola
17. Kishanganj
18. Aluabari Road Junction
19. Thakurganj
20. Galgalia
21. Naxalbari
22. Bagdogra
23. Siliguri Junction (Note: The train reverses direction here)
24. New Mal Junction
25. Banarhat
26. Dalgaon
27. Binnaguri
28. Madarihat
29. Hasimara
30. Hamiltonganj
31. Alipurduar Junction.

== Traction ==
As the route is fully electrified, it is hauled by a Sealdah based WAP 7 electric locomotive from end to end.

== Incidents ==
On 5 June 2021 a minor fire broke out in air-conditioned coach of Sealdah-Alipurdiars up Kanchan Kanya Express near Siliguri Junction. It was later examined and extinguished by officials and the train continued its journey towards New Malbazar and Dooars.

== Other trains on the Kolkata–New Jalpaiguri sector ==
- 22301/02 Howrah–New Jalpaiguri Vande Bharat Express
- 12041/42 New Jalpaiguri–Howrah Shatabdi Express
- 12377/78 Padatik Express
- 12343/44 Darjeeling Mail
- 15959/60 Kamrup Express
- 13175/76 Sealdah–Silchar Kanchanjunga Express
- 12345/46 Saraighat Express
- 15722/23 Paharia Express
- 12517/18 Kolkata–Guwahati Garib Rath Express
- 12501/02 Kolkata - Agartala Garib Rath Express
- 13115/16 Sealdah - Jalpaiguri Road Humsafar Express
- 13141/42 Teesta Torsha Express
- 13147/58 Uttar Banga Express
- 12503/04 Bangalore Cantonment–Agartala Humsafar Express
- 13181/82 Kolkata–Silghat Town Kaziranga Express
- 22511/12 Lokmanya Tilak Terminus–Kamakhya Karmabhoomi Express
- 15644/45 Puri–Kamakhya Weekly Express (via Howrah)
- 12364/65 Kolkata–Haldibari Intercity Express
- 12509/10 Guwahati–Bengaluru Cantt. Superfast Express
- 12507/08 Thiruvananthapuram–Silchar Superfast Express
- 12514/15 Guwahati–Secunderabad Express
