= Binnaguri railway station =

Railway Station in West Bengal, India

General information
- Location: Station Rd, Telipara Tea Garden, Binnaguri West Bengal 735203, India
- Coordinates: 26.7499°N 89.0579°E
- Elevation: 216.00 metres (708.66 ft)
- System: Indian Railways Station
- Owner: Indian Railways
- Operator: Northeast Frontier Railway zone
- Line: New Jalpaiguri–Alipurduar–Samuktala Road line
- Platforms: 3
- Tracks: 4 (broad gauge)

Construction
- Structure type: At grade
- Parking: Available

Other information
- Status: Functioning
- Station code: BNV
- Zone(s): Northeast Frontier Railway zone
- Division(s): Alipurduar

History
- Electrified: Yes (2023)
Location
- Location within West Bengal Location within India

Binnaguri railway station is the railway station which serves the town of Binnaguri which is a part of Dooars region in the Indian state of West Bengal. It lies in the New Jalpaiguri–Alipurduar–Samuktala Road line of Northeast Frontier Railway zone, Alipurduar railway division.

== Trains ==
Major trains running from Binnaguri railway station are as follows:

- Sir M Visvesvaraya Terminal - Alipurduar Amrit Bharat Express (16597/16598)
- Panvel–Alipurduar Amrit Bharat Express (11031/11032)
- Dr. Ambedkar Nagar–Kamakhya Express (19305/19306)
- Kamakhya–Anand Vihar Terminal Superfast Express (15621/15622)
- New Jalpaiguri–Alipurduar Tourist Express (15777/15778)
- Delhi Junction - Alipurduar Mahananda Express (15483/15484)
- Alipurduar - Secunderabad Express (05479/05480)
- Sealdah - Alipurduar Kanchan Kanya Express(13149/13150)
- Kamakhya–Arrah Junction Capital Express (13247/13248)
- Ranchi–Kamakhya Express (15661/15662)
- Siliguri–Alipurduar Intercity Express (15767/15768)
- Siliguri Bamanhat Intercity Express (15467/15468).
- Siliguri–Dhubri Intercity Express (15765/15766)
