= Carron, (West Bengal) railway station =

Railway station in West Bengal, India

Carron Railway Station

General information
- Location: Sadhupur Chengmari, National Highway 31C, Carron, Pin - 735205, Dist - Jalpaiguri State: West Bengal; India
- Coordinates: 26.8799°N 88.9706°E
- Elevation: 161 metres (528 ft)
- System: Indian Railways Station
- Owner: Indian Railways
- Operator: Northeast Frontier Railway zone
- Line: New Jalpaiguri–Alipurduar–Samuktala Road line
- Platforms: 2
- Tracks: 3 (broad gauge)

Construction
- Parking: Available

Other information
- Status: Functioning
- Station code: CRX
- Zone(s): Northeast Frontier Railway zone
- Division(s): Alipurduar
Location
- Location within West Bengal Location within India

Carron railway station is the railway station which serves the tea gardens of Carron, Looksan, Grassmore etc. near Diana river of Jalpaiguri district in the Indian state of West Bengal. It lies in the New Jalpaiguri–Alipurduar–Samuktala Road line of Northeast Frontier Railway zone, Alipurduar railway division. Local trains along with some important trains like Siliguri–Alipurduar Intercity Express etc. are available from this station.
