= KCF =

KCF or kcf may refer to:

- Khalistan Commando Force, a militant Khalistani organisation
- Kinross Correctional Facility, a Michigan prison for men
- Korea Cycling Federation, the national governing body of cycle racing in South Korea
- KCF, the station code for Kalchini railway station, West Bengal, India
- kcf, the ISO 639-3 code for Ukaan language, Nigeria
