= Madarihat railway station =

Railway station in West Bengal, India

Madarihat Railway Station

General information
- Location: National Highway 17, Madarihat, Dooars, Dist - Alipurduar State: West Bengal; India
- Coordinates: 26.7000°N 89.2833°E
- Elevation: 102 metres (335 ft)
- System: Indian Railways Station
- Owner: Indian Railways
- Operator: Northeast Frontier Railway zone
- Line: New Jalpaiguri–Alipurduar–Samuktala Road line
- Platforms: 2
- Tracks: 3 (broad gauge)

Construction
- Structure type: At grade
- Parking: Available

Other information
- Status: Functioning
- Station code: MDT
- Zone(s): Northeast Frontier Railway zone
- Division(s): Alipurduar
Location
- Location within West Bengal Location within India

Madarihat Railway Station is a railway station that serves the town of Madarihat, in the Doars region in the Indian state of West Bengal. The station lies on New Jalpaiguri–Alipurduar–Samuktala Road line of Northeast Frontier Railway zone, in the Alipurduar railway division. Major trains like Kanchan Kanya Express, New Jalpaiguri–Alipurduar Tourist Special, Siliguri–Alipurduar Intercity Express, Siliguri–Dhubri Intercity Express and others stop and pass through this station.
