= Siliguri–Dhubri Intercity Express =

Express train in northeast India

Siliguri Junction - Dhubri Intercity Express
Overview
- Service type: Express
- Locale: West Bengal, Assam
- First service: 27 March 2010; 16 years ago
- Current operator: Northeast Frontier Railway zone

Route
- Termini: Siliguri Junction; Dhubri
- Stops: 17
- Distance travelled: 261 km (162 mi)
- Average journey time: 8 hours 02 mins
- Service frequency: Daily
- Train number: 15765 / 15766

On-board services
- Class: general unreserved/Second Sitting
- Seating arrangements: Yes
- Sleeping arrangements: Yes
- Catering facilities: No

Technical
- Rolling stock: Standard Indian Railways Coaches
- Track gauge: 1,676 mm (5 ft 6 in)
- Operating speed: 35 km/h (22 mph)

The 15765 / 66 Siliguri Junction - Dhubri Intercity Express is an Express train belonging to Indian Railways Northeast Frontier Railway zone that runs between Siliguri Junction of West Bengal and Dhubri of Assam in India.

It operates as train number 15765 from Siliguri Junction to Dhubri and as train number 15766 in the reverse direction serving the states of Assam & West Bengal.

== Coaches ==
The 15765 / 66 Siliguri Junction - Dhubri Intercity Express has nine general unreserved and two SLR (seating with luggage rake) coaches . It does not carry a pantry car coach.

As is customary with most train services in India, coach composition may be amended at the discretion of Indian Railways depending on demand.

== Service ==
The 15765 Siliguri Junction - Dhubri Intercity Express covers the distance of 261 km (162 mi) in 6 hours 20 mins (41 km/h) and in 9 hours 05 mins as the 15766 Dhubri - Siliguri Junction Intercity Express (29 km/h).

As the average speed of the train is lower than 55 km/h (34 mph), as per railway rules, its fare doesn't includes a Superfast surcharge.

== Routing ==
The 15765 / 66 Siliguri Junction - Dhubri Intercity Express runs from

- Siliguri Junction via
- New Malbazar Junction
- Nagrakata
- Banarhat Railway Station
- Dalgaon Railway Station
- Binnaguri railway station
- Madarihat Railway Station
- Hasimara Railway Station
- Hamiltonganj railway station
- Kalchini Railway Station
- Alipurduar Junction
- New Cooch Behar Junction
- Tufanganj Railway Station
- Golokganj railway station to
- Dhubri railway station.

== Traction ==
As the route is going to electrification, a Malda Town based WDM-3D diesel locomotive pulls the train to its destination.

== Incidents ==
On 29 September 2019, Siliguri - Dhubri Intercity Express Engine hits and injures an elephant between Banarhat and Nagrakata in Jalpaiguri district of West Bengal. The injured elephant later passes away after struggling for hours.
