= SMVT Bengaluru–Alipurduar Amrit Bharat Express =

Amrit Bharat Express train route in India

SMVT Bengaluru – Alipurduar Amrit Bharat Express
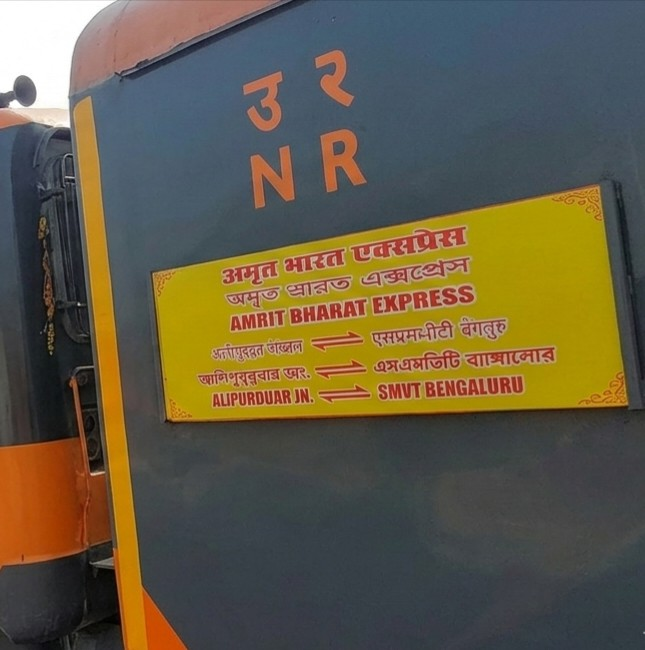

Overview
- Service type: Amrit Bharat Express, Superfast Express train
- Locale: Karnataka, Tamil Nadu, Andhra Pradesh, Odisha, Bihar and West Bengal
- First service: 17 January 2026; 3 months ago (Inaugural)
- Current operator: South Western Railways (SWR)

Route
- Termini: Sir M. Visvesvaraya Terminal (SMVT); Alipurduar (APDJ)
- Stops: 44
- Distance travelled: 2,626 km (1,632 mi) (TBC)
- Average journey time: 49 hrs 30 mins (TBC)
- Service frequency: Weekly (Note: 16597 – Saturdays | 16598 – Mondays)
- Train number: 16597 / 16598
- Lines used: SMVT Bengaluru–Bangrapet–Jolarpettai line; Katpadi–Renigunta line; Vijayawada–Duvvada line; Vizianagaram–Khurda Road; Cuttack–Kharagpur line; Barddhaman–Rampurhat line; Rampurhat–Malda Town line; Barsoi–Kishanganj–Aluabari Road; New Jalpaiguri–Siliguri–Alipurduar line

On-board services
- Class: Sleeper class coach (SL) General unreserved coach (GS)
- Seating arrangements: Yes
- Sleeping arrangements: Yes
- Catering facilities: (TBC)
- Observation facilities: Saffron-grey livery
- Entertainment facilities: On-board WiFi; Infotainment system; Electric outlets; Reading light; Seat pockets; Bottle holder; Tray table
- Baggage facilities: Overhead racks
- Other facilities: Kavach

Technical
- Rolling stock: Modern LHB coaches
- Track gauge: Indian gauge
- Electrification: 25 kV 50 Hz AC overhead line
- Operating speed: 53 km/h (33 mph) (Avg.) (TBC)
- Track owner: Indian Railways
- Rake maintenance: SMVT Bengaluru (SMVT)

The 16597/16598 Sir M. Visvesvaraya Terminal Bengaluru–Alipurduar Amrit Bharat Express is India's 19th non-AC Superfast Amrit Bharat Express train, which runs across the states of Karnataka, Tamil Nadu, Andhra Pradesh, Odisha, Bihar and West Bengal by connecting the Silicon city SMVT Bengaluru of Karnataka with Alipurduar Junction railway station of Alipurduar, the Bhutan Gateway city in West Bengal.

This express train is inaugurated on 17 January 2026 by Prime Minister Narendra Modi via video conference from Malda Town in India.

== Overview ==
This train is currently operated by Indian Railways, connecting SMVT Bengaluru and Alipurduar Junction. It is currently operated with train numbers 16597/16598 on a weekly basis.

== Schedule ==
Train schedule: SMVT Bengaluru ↔ Alipurduar Amrit Bharat Express
Train no.	Station code	Departure station	Departure time	Departure day	Arrival station	Arrival hours
16597	SMVB	SMVT Bengaluru	8:50 AM	Alipurduar Junction	10:25 AM	49h 35m
16598	APDJ	Alipurduar Junction	10:25 PM	SMVT Bengaluru	3:00 AM	52h 35m

== Route and halts ==
Route and halts of SMVT Bengaluru–Alipurduar Amrit Bharat Express:
16597 SMVT → APDJ	16598 APDJ → SMVT
Sir M. Visvesvaraya Terminal	Alipurduar Junction
Krishnarajapuram	Hasimara
Bangarapet Junction	Binnaguri
Kuppam	Siliguri Junction
Jolarpettai Junction	New Jalpaiguri Junction
Katpadi Junction	Aluabari Road Junction
Chittoor	Kishanganj
Renigunta Junction	Barsoi Junction
Nellore	Malda Town
Ongole	Rampurhat Junction
Chirala	Bolpur Shantiniketan
Tenali Junction	Barddhaman Junction
Vijayawada Junction	Dankuni Junction
Eluru	Andul
Rajahmundry	Kharagpur Junction
Samalkot Junction	Balasore
Anakapalle	Bhadrak
Duvvada	Jajpur Keonjhar Road
Pendurti	Cuttack Junction
Kottavalasa Junction	Bhubaneswar
Vizianagaram Junction	Khurda Road Junction
Srikakulam Road	Balugaon
Brahmapur	Palasa
Palasa	Brahmapur
Balugaon	Srikakulam Road
Khurda Road Junction	Vizianagaram Junction
Bhubaneswar	Kottavalasa Junction
Cuttack Junction	Pendurti
Jajpur Keonjhar Road	Duvvada
Bhadrak	Anakapalle
Balasore	Samalkot Junction
Kharagpur Junction	Rajahmundry
Andul	Eluru
Dankuni Junction	Vijayawada Junction
Barddhaman Junction	Tenali Junction
Bolpur Shantiniketan	Chirala
Rampurhat Junction	Ongole
Malda Town	Nellore
Barsoi Junction	Renigunta Junction
Kishanganj	Chittoor
Aluabari Road Junction	Katpadi Junction
New Jalpaiguri Junction	Jolarpettai Junction
Siliguri Junction	Kuppam
Binnaguri	Bangarapet Junction
Hasimara	Krishnarajapuram
Alipurduar Junction	Sir M. Visvesvaraya Terminal

== Coach composition ==
Coach Composition
Category	Coaches	Total
SLRD (Divyangjan coach)	SLRD, SLRD	2
General unreserved (GEN)	GEN1, GEN2, GEN3, GEN4, GEN5, GEN6, GEN7	7
Sleeper class (SL)	S8, S7, S6, S5, S4, S3, S2, S1	8
Pantry car (PC)	PC	1
General unreserved (GEN)	GEN8, GEN9, GEN10, GEN11, GEN12	5
SLRD (Divyangjan coach)	SLRD	1
Total coaches		22

- Primary maintenance – Sir M. Visvesvaraya Terminal
- Secondary maintenance – Alipurduar Coaching Depot

== Rakes ==
It is the 19th Amrit Bharat 2.0 Express train in which the locomotives were designed by Chittaranjan Locomotive Works (CLW) at Chittaranjan, West Bengal and the coaches were designed and manufactured by the Integral Coach Factory at Perambur, Chennai under the Make in India initiative.

== See also ==
- Amrit Bharat Express
- Vande Bharat Express
- Tejas Express
- Sir M. Visvesvaraya Terminal
- Alipurduar Junction

== Notes ==
Runs a day in a week with both directions.
