= Hamiltonganj railway station =

Railway station in West Bengal

Hamiltonganj Railway Station

General information
- Location: National Highway 31C, Hamiltonganj, Alipurduar district, West Bengal; India
- Coordinates: 26.6866°N 89.4246°E
- Elevation: 111 metres (364 ft)
- System: Indian Railways Station
- Owner: Indian Railways
- Operator: Northeast Frontier Railway zone
- Line: New Jalpaiguri–Alipurduar–Samuktala Road line
- Platforms: 1
- Tracks: 2 (broad gauge)

Construction
- Structure type: At grade
- Parking: Available

Other information
- Status: Functioning
- Station code: HOJ
- Zone(s): Northeast Frontier Railway zone
- Division(s): Alipurduar
Location
- Location within West Bengal Location within India

Hamiltonganj railway station serves the areas of Hamiltonganj, Kalchini, Hasimara and Jaigaon lying on Doars region in the Indian state of West Bengal. It lies in the New Jalpaiguri–Alipurduar–Samuktala Road line of Northeast Frontier Railway zone, Alipurduar railway division.

== Trains ==
Major trains running from Hamiltonganj Railway Station are as follows:

- Sealdah-Alipurduar Kanchan Kanya Express
- Siliguri–Bamanhat Express
- Siliguri–Alipurduar Intercity Express
- Siliguri–Dhubri Intercity Express
