= Panvel–Alipurduar Amrit Bharat Express =

Amrit Bharat Express train route in India

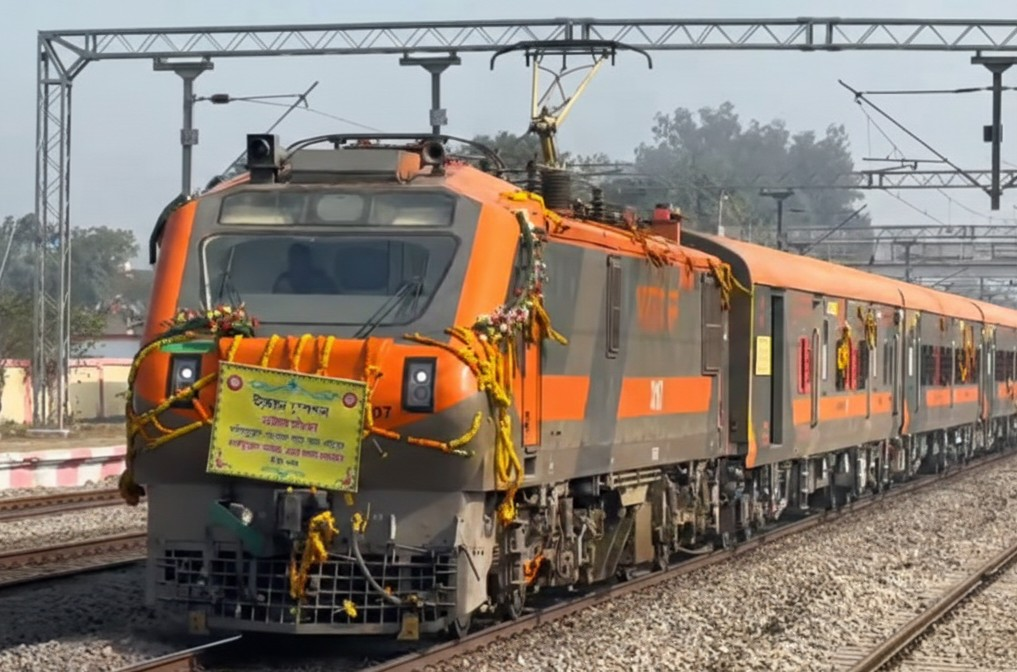
- PNVL–APDJ crossing Danapur

Overview
- Service type: Amrit Bharat Express, Superfast
- Status: Active
- Locale: Maharashtra, Madhya Pradesh, Uttar Pradesh, Bihar and West Bengal
- First service: 17 January 2026; 3 months ago (Inaugural); 23 February 2026; 2 months ago (Commercial)
- Current operator: Central Railways (CR)

Route
- Termini: Panvel (PNVL); Alipurduar Junction (APDJ)
- Stops: 34
- Distance travelled: 2,355 km (1,463 mi)
- Average journey time: 50 hrs 0 mins
- Service frequency: Weekly
- Train number: 11031/11032
- Lines used: Panvel Towards → Kalyan–Bhusaval line; Bhusaval–Itarsi–Jabalpur line; Jabalpur–Prayagraj Chheoki line; Pt. Deen Dayal Upadhyaya–Buxar–Ara line; Patliputra–Hajipur line; Muzaffarpur–Samastipur line; Khagaria–Mansi line; Katihar–Siliguri line towards (Barsoi Junction, New Jalpaiguri Junction); Binnaguri–Alipurduar line

On-board services
- Class: Sleeper class coach (SL) General unreserved coach (GS)
- Seating arrangements: Yes
- Sleeping arrangements: Yes
- Auto-rack arrangements: Upper
- Catering facilities: On-board catering
- Observation facilities: Saffron-grey
- Entertainment facilities: Electric outlets; Reading lights; Bottle holder
- Other facilities: CCTV cameras; Bio-vacuum toilets; Foot-operated water taps; Passenger information system

Technical
- Rolling stock: Modified LHB coaches
- Track gauge: Indian gauge
- Electrification: 25 kV 50 Hz AC overhead line
- Operating speed: 47 km (29 mi) (Avg.)
- Track owner: Indian Railways
- Rake sharing: No

The 11031/11032 Panvel–Alipurduar Amrit Bharat Express is India's 17th non-AC Superfast Amrit Bharat Express train, which runs across the states of Maharashtra, Madhya Pradesh, Uttar Pradesh, Bihar and West Bengal by connecting the Gateway of Konkan city Panvel with Alipurduar Junction, the Bhutan Gateway city in West Bengal.

== Overview ==
- The Panvel–Alipurduar Amrit Bharat Express was inaugurated by Prime Minister Narendra Modi through video conferencing.
- The inaugural run of the train took place between Siliguri and Panvel on 18 January, instead of operating between Alipurduar Junction and Panvel as originally planned.
- The commercial operation of the train was delayed by nearly one month due to rake maintenance issues at the Panvel Coaching Depot.
- Bookings for train nos. 11031/11032 commenced on 19 February. The first commercial service departed from Panvel on 22 February and from Alipurduar Junction on 26 February.

== Schedule ==
11031 / 11032 Panvel–Alipurduar Amrit Bharat Express
Train type	Amrit Bharat Express
Distance	2660 km (11031) / 2660 km (11032)
Average speed	~55 km/h
Journey time (PNVL → APDJ)	~50 hrs 00 min
Journey time (APDJ → PNVL)	~48 hrs 45 min
Classes available	Sleeper (SL), General (GS)
Operating days	Weekly
Operator	Indian Railways

== Route and halts ==
11031 / 11032 Panvel–Alipurduar Amrit Bharat Express Schedule
Sr.	11031 PNVL → APDJ				11032 APDJ → PNVL			
Sr.	Station	Day	Arr.	Dep.	Station	Day	Arr.	Dep.
1	Panvel Junction	1	—	11:50	Alipurduar Junction	1	—	04:45
2	Kalyan Junction	1	12:22	12:25	Hasimara	1	05:35	05:37
3	Igatpuri	1	14:20	14:25	Binnaguri	1	06:10	06:12
4	Nashik Road	1	15:10	15:13	Siliguri Junction	1	08:10	08:12
5	Jalgaon Junction	1	18:22	18:24	New Jalpaiguri Junction	1	08:35	08:45
6	Bhusaval Junction	1	19:00	19:05	Aluabari Road Junction	1	09:33	09:35
7	Itarsi Junction	1	23:45	23:55	Kishanganj	1	10:00	10:02
8	Pipariya	2	00:44	00:46	Barsoi Junction	1	10:45	10:47
9	Jabalpur Junction	2	03:10	03:20	Katihar Junction	1	12:50	13:00
10	Katni Junction	2	04:38	04:40	Naugachia	1	13:55	13:57
11	Satna Junction	2	05:50	05:55	Mansi Junction	1	15:07	15:09
12	Manikpur Junction	2	08:30	08:32	Khagaria Junction	1	15:25	15:27
13	Bargarh	2	09:00	09:02	Hasanpur Road Junction	1	16:00	16:02
14	Prayagraj Chheoki Junction	2	10:25	10:30	Samastipur Junction	1	16:50	16:55
15	Meja Road	2	10:53	10:55	Muzaffarpur Junction	1	18:40	18:45
16	Mirzapur	2	11:35	11:37	Hajipur Junction	1	19:30	19:35
17	Pt. Deen Dayal Upadhyaya Junction	2	14:58	15:05	Sonpur Junction	1	19:45	19:47
18	Buxar	2	16:13	16:15	Patliputra Junction	1	20:35	20:40
19	Ara Junction	2	16:58	17:00	Danapur	1	20:55	20:57
20	Danapur	2	17:43	17:45	Ara Junction	1	21:27	21:29
21	Patliputra Junction	2	18:25	18:35	Buxar	1	22:09	22:11
22	Sonpur Junction	2	19:38	19:40	Pt. Deen Dayal Upadhyaya Junction	2	00:13	00:20
23	Hajipur Junction	2	19:50	19:55	Mirzapur	2	01:10	01:12
24	Muzaffarpur Junction	2	21:35	21:40	Meja Road	2	01:50	01:52
25	Samastipur Junction	2	22:45	22:50	Prayagraj Chheoki Junction	2	03:10	03:15
26	Hasanpur Road	2	23:32	23:34	Bargarh	2	04:20	04:22
27	Khagaria Junction	3	00:23	00:25	Manikpur Junction	2	05:43	05:45
28	Mansi Junction	3	00:36	00:38	Satna Junction	2	06:55	07:00
29	Naugachia	3	01:37	01:39	Katni Junction	2	08:18	08:20
30	Katihar Junction	3	03:20	03:30	Jabalpur Junction	2	10:05	10:15
31	Barsoi Junction	3	04:05	04:07	Pipariya	2	11:58	12:00
32	Kishanganj	3	05:03	05:05	Itarsi Junction	2	13:25	13:35
33	Aluabari Road Junction	3	05:28	05:30	Bhusaval Junction	2	18:45	18:50
34	New Jalpaiguri Junction	3	06:40	06:50	Jalgaon Junction	2	19:25	19:28
35	Siliguri Junction	3	07:13	07:15	Nashik Road	2	23:35	23:38
36	Binnaguri	3	10:20	10:22	Igatpuri	3	00:30	01:25
37	Hasimara	3	12:08	12:10	Kalyan Junction	3	03:20	03:22
38	Alipurduar Junction	3	13:50	—	Panvel Junction	3	05:30	—

== Coach composition ==
Coach Composition
Category	Coaches	Total
SLRD (Divyangjan Coach)	SLRD, SLRD	2
General Unreserved (GEN)	GEN1, GEN2, GEN3, GEN4, GEN5, GEN6, GEN7	7
Sleeper class (SL)	S8, S7, S6, S5, S4, S3, S2, S1	8
Pantry car (PC)	PC	1
General Unreserved (GEN)	GEN8, GEN9, GEN10, GEN11, GEN12	5
SLRD (Divyangjan Coach)	SLRD	1
Total Coaches		22

- Primary Maintenance – Panvel Coaching Depot
- Secondary Maintenance – Alipurduar Coaching Depot

== Rakes ==
It is the 17th Amrit Bharat 2.0 Express train in which the locomotives were designed by Chittaranjan Locomotive Works (CLW) at Chittaranjan, West Bengal and the coaches were designed and manufactured by the Integral Coach Factory at Perambur, Chennai under the Make in India initiative.

== See also ==
- Amrit Bharat Express
- Vande Bharat Express
- Vande Bharat Slepper
- Panvel
- Alipurduar Junction
