= Rajabhatkhawa railway station =

Railway station in West Bengal, India

Rajabhatkhawa Railway Station
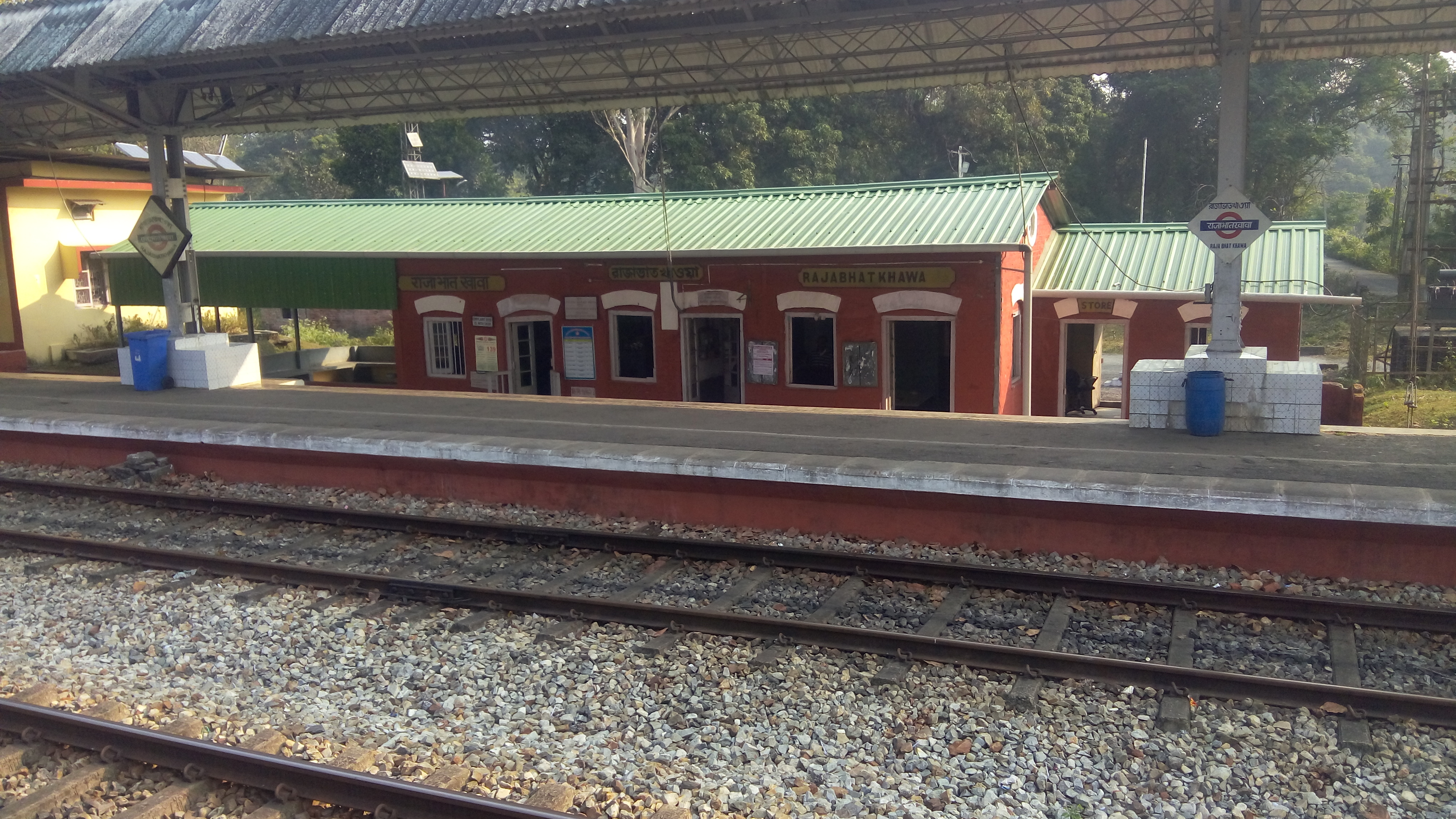

General information
- Location: NH 31C, Rajabhatkhawa, Dooars, Alipurduar district, West Bengal; India
- Coordinates: 26.62°N 89.53°E
- Elevation: 221 metres (725 ft)
- System: Indian Railways Station
- Owner: Indian Railways
- Operator: Northeast Frontier Railway zone
- Line: New Jalpaiguri–Alipurduar–Samuktala Road line
- Platforms: 2
- Tracks: 3 (Broad Gauge)

Construction
- Structure type: At grade
- Parking: Available
- Cycle facilities: Available

Other information
- Status: Functioning
- Station code: RVK
- Zone(s): Northeast Frontier Railway zone
- Division(s): Alipurduar
Location
- Location within West Bengal Location within India

Rajabhatkhawa railway station is the railway station that serves the town of Rajabhatkhawa, lying in the Dooars region in the Indian state of West Bengal.The station lies on New Jalpaiguri–Alipurduar–Samuktala Road line of Northeast Frontier Railway zone in the Alipurduar railway division. Major trains like New Jalpaiguri–Alipurduar Tourist Express, Siliguri–Alipurduar Intercity Express etc. are available from this station.

== Facilities ==
The station is equipped with basic facilities. Recently an old coach was refurbished and converted into a restaurant on the outskirts of the station building. It is built to promote tourism and provide refreshment to tourists.
