= New Mal Junction railway station =

Railway Station in West Bengal, India

New Mal Junction নিউ মাল জংশন
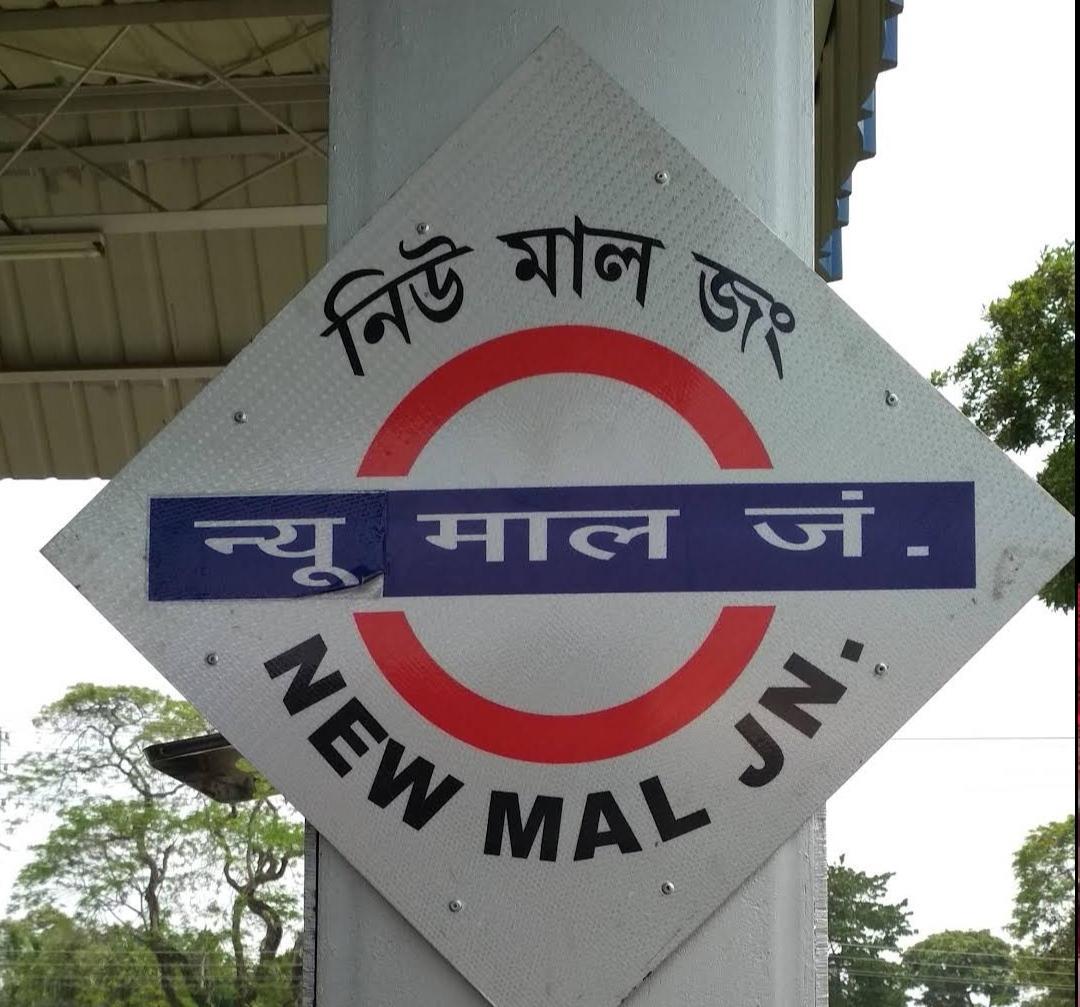

General information
- Location: 31, Haihai Pathar Tea Garden I P, West Bengal 735221; India
- Coordinates: 26.8741°N 88.7258°E
- Elevation: 161.00 metres (528.22 ft)
- System: Indian Railways Station
- Owner: Indian Railways
- Operator: Northeast Frontier Railway zone
- Lines: New Jalpaiguri–Alipurduar–Samuktala Road line; New Mal–Changrabandha–New Cooch Behar line
- Platforms: 4
- Tracks: 5 (broad gauge)

Construction
- Structure type: At grade
- Parking: Available

Other information
- Status: Functioning
- Station code: NMZ
- Zone(s): Northeast Frontier Railway zone
- Division(s): Alipurduar
Location
- Location within West Bengal Location within India

New Mal Junction also known as New Malbazar Junction (station code NMZ) is the major railway station among two railway stations which serve the Municipality of Malbazar, the other being Malbazar Railway Station (code MLBZ). This station is commonly known as Mal, It lies in Jalpaiguri district of West Bengal. New Mal Junction lies on two railway line New Jalpaiguri–Alipurduar–Samuktala Road line and is the originating point of New Mal–Changrabandha–New Cooch Behar line. New Mal is the headquarter station of Sub-Divisional Railway officer designated as Assistant Divisional Engineer.

== Trains ==
Trains serving this station are listed below:

=== Major trains ===
● Lokmanya Tilak Terminus–Kamakhya Karmabhoomi Express (22511/22512)

● Dr. Ambedkar Nagar–Kamakhya Express (19035/19036)

● Kamakhya–Anand Vihar Terminal Express (15621/15622)

● New Jalpaiguri–Alipurduar Tourist Express (15777/15778)

● Ranchi–Kamakhya Express (15661/15662)

● Puri–Kamakhya Express via Howrah (15643/15644)

● Delhi Junction - Alipurduar Mahananda Express (15484/15483)

● Sealdah - Alipurduar Kanchan Kanya Express (13149/13150)

● Kamakhya–Arrah Junction Capital Express (13247/13248)

● Jhajha–Dibrugarh Express (15941/15942)

● Alipurduar - Secunderabad Express (05479/05480)

● Siliguri Junction - Alipurduar Intercity Express (15767/15768)

● Siliguri Junction - Dhubri Intercity Express (15765/15766)

● Siliguri Junction - Bamanhat Express (15467/15468)

=== Other trains ===
- 55725 - Alipurduar–New Jalpaiguri Passenger
- 55467 - Bamanhat–Siliguri Passenger
- 75716 - Dinhata–Siliguri DEMU
- 07513 - Bamanhat -Siliguri Junction DEMU Special (via Changrabandha)
- 77525 - Siliguri-New Bongaigaon DEMU
- 75714 - New Cooch Behar–Siliguri Jn DEMU (via Changrabandha)
- 75743 - Siliguri junction - Dhubri DEMU
- 05777 - New Jalpaiguri–Alipurduar Passenger special
- 75717 - Siliguri Junction - Bamanhat DEMU
- 07525 - New Bongaigaon - Siliguri Jn. DEMU Special (via Dhubri - Mathabhanga)
- 75741- Dhubri - Siliguri DEMU Intercity Express
