= Odlabari =

- Census Town
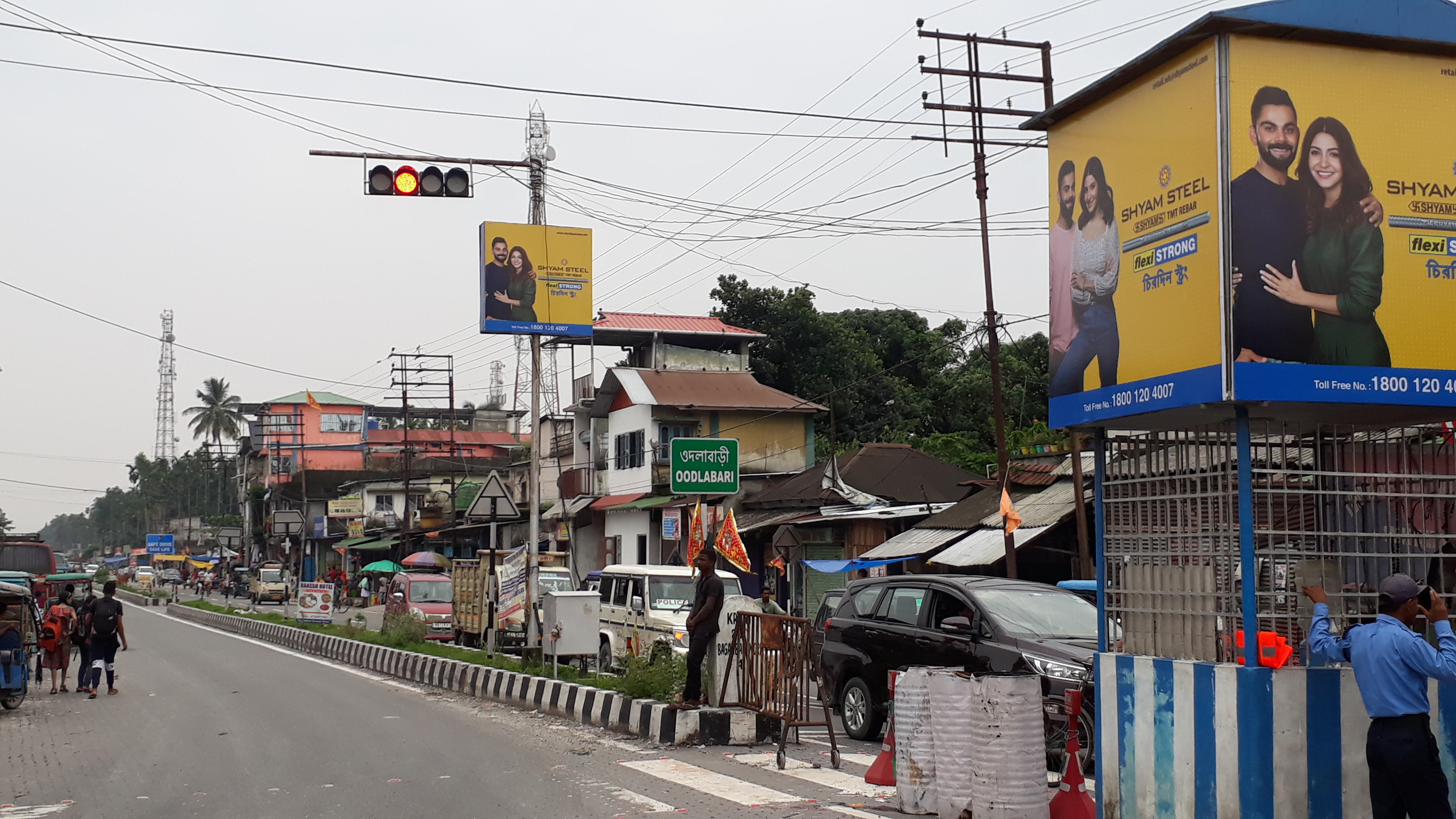
- Odlabari Bus stand

- Location in West Bengal, India Odlabari (India)
- Coordinates: 26.8594°N 88.6214°E
- Country: India
- State: West Bengal
- District: Jalpaiguri
- Established: unknown
- Founder: unknown

Area
  - Total: 9.2766 km^{2} (3.5817 sq mi)

Population (2011)
  - Total: 14,194
  - Density: 1,530.1/km^{2} (3,962.9/sq mi)
- Time zone: UTC+5:30 (IST)
- PIN: 735222
- Telephone/STD code: 03562
- Vehicle registration: WB
- Lok Sabha constituency: Jalpaiguri
- Vidhan Sabha constituency: Mal
- Website: jalpaiguri.gov.in kyakaisehindime.com

Oodlabari is a census town located in the Malbazar subdivision of Jalpaiguri district in the Indian state of West Bengal. Situated in the foothills of the Himalayas, Oodlabari is surrounded by tea gardens and dense forests.

== Geography ==
Places and tea estates in Malbabazar subdivision (including Mal, Nagrakata and Matiali CD blocks) in Jalpaiguri district
CT: census town, R: rural/ urban centre, N: neighbourhood, NP: national park/ wildlife sanctuary, TE: tea estate
Abbreviations used in names – TG for Tea Garden (town/village), TE for Tea Estate, JRS: junction railway station
Owing to space constraints in the small map, the actual locations in a larger map may vary slightly

=== Location ===
Odlabari is located at 26.8594°N 88.6214°E.

=== Area overview ===
Gorumara National Park has overtaken the traditionally popular Jaldapara National Park in footfall and Malbazar has emerged as one of the most important towns in the Dooars. Malbazar subdivision is presented in the map alongside. It is a predominantly rural area with 88.62% of the population living in rural areas and 11.32% living in the urban areas. Tea gardens in the Dooars and Terai regions produce 226 million kilograms (500×10^{6} lb) or over a quarter of India's total tea crop. Some tea gardens were identified in the 2011 census as census towns or villages. Such places are marked in the map as CT (census town) or R (rural/ urban centre). Specific tea estate pages are marked TE.

Note: The map alongside presents some of the notable locations in the subdivision. All places marked in the map are linked in the larger full screen map.

== Demographics ==
As per the 2011 Census of India, Odlabari had a total population of 14,194. There were 7,182 (51%) males and 7,012 (49%) females. There were 1,696 persons in the age range of 0 to 6 years. The total number of literate people in Odlabari was 9,592 (76.75% of the population over 6 years). The projected population of Odlabari in 2025 is approximately 20,400-25,000. This estimate is based on the town's population growth trend, with the population increasing from 14,194 in 2011 to an estimated 19,900 in 2024.

== Infrastructure ==
According to the District Census Handbook 2011, Jalpaiguri, Odlabari covered an area of 9.2766 km^{2} (3.58 sq mi). Among the civic amenities, it had 15 km (9.3 mi) roads with both open and covered drains, the protected water supply involved river infiltration gallery, service reservoir, tap water from treated sources, uncovered well. It had 1,200 domestic electric connections. Among the medical facilities it had 1 hospital, 1 dispensary/ health centre, 1 veterinary hospital, and 8 medicine shops. Among the educational facilities it had 4 primary schools, 3 middle schools, 3 secondary schools, 2 senior secondary schools, and 1 non-formal education centre (Sarvya Siksha Abhiyan). Among the social, cultural and recreational facilities, it had 1 cinema theatre, 1 public library, and 1 reading room. It had branches of 1 nationalised bank and 1 cooperative bank.

== Economy ==
Oodlabari is surrounded by several tea estates, including Ranichera, Rungamatee, Gurjanjhora, and the Oodlabari Tea Estate. The Dooars region contains approximately 150 tea estates; among these, the Oodlabari Tea Estate is notable as one of the few producers of green tea in the area.

== Transport ==
There is a station at Odlabari Railway Station on the New Jalpaiguri-Alipurduar-Samuktala Road line.

== Tourism ==
Oodlabari offers some of the most spectacular sights in the Dooars region. The rivers Leesh and Chel are on either side of the town. About 5 km (3.1 mi) to the south are the forests of Baikunthapur with the Kathambari range that is home to Asiatic elephants. One can visit the Teesta barrage and reservoir at Gajoldoba.

== Healthcare ==
Odlabari Block Primary Health Centre, with 10 beds at PO Panbari, is the major government medical facility in the Mal CD block.
