= Odlabari railway station =

Railway station in West Bengal

Odlabari Railway Station

General information
- Location: National Highway 17, Oodlabari, Pin - 735222, Dist - Jalpaiguri State: West Bengal; India
- Coordinates: 26.8594°N 88.6214°E
- Elevation: 164 metres (538 ft)
- System: Indian Railways Station
- Owner: Indian Railways
- Operator: Northeast Frontier Railway zone
- Line: New Jalpaiguri–Alipurduar–Samuktala Road line
- Platforms: 1
- Tracks: 2 (broad gauge)

Construction
- Structure type: At grade
- Parking: Available

Other information
- Status: Functioning
- Station code: ODB
- Zone(s): Northeast Frontier Railway zone
- Division(s): Alipurduar
Location
- Location within West Bengal Location within India

Oodlabari railway station is the railway station which serves the census town of Odlabari lying on Doars region in the Indian state of West Bengal. It lies in the New Jalpaiguri–Alipurduar–Samuktala Road line of Northeast Frontier Railway zone, Alipurduar railway division.

== Trains ==
Major trains running from Oodlabari Railway Station are as follows:

- Siliguri Bamanhat Intercity Express.
- Siliguri–Alipurduar Intercity Express
