= BNQ =

BNQ or bnq may refer to:

- BNQ, the Indian Railways station code for Banarhat railway station, West Bengal, India
- bnq, the ISO 639-3 code for Bantik language, Indonesia
- Bibliothèque nationale du Québec (BNQ), forerunner of the Bibliothèque et Archives nationales du Québec
