= Alipurduar–Secunderabad Express =

Alipurduar Secunderabad Express
Overview
- Service type: Express
- First service: 8 July 2022; 3 years ago
- Current operator: Northeast Frontier Railway

Route
- Termini: Alipurduar Junction (APDJ); Secunderabad (SEC)
- Stops: 20
- Distance travelled: 2,267 km (1,409 mi)
- Average journey time: 41 hours 45 mins
- Service frequency: Weekly
- Train number: 05479/05480

On-board services
- Classes: AC 2 Tier, AC 3 Tier, Sleeper 3 Tier, Unreserved
- Seating arrangements: Yes
- Sleeping arrangements: Yes
- Catering facilities: Yes
- Observation facilities: ICF coach
- Entertainment facilities: No
- Baggage facilities: Available

Technical
- Rolling stock: 2
- Track gauge: 1,676 mm (5 ft 6 in)
- Operating speed: 54 km/h (34 mph)

Alipurduar – Secunderabad Express is an Indian Railways express train belonging to Northeast Frontier Railway, connecting Alipurduar Junction in West Bengal and Secunderabad in Hyderabad, Telangana. It currently operates on a once-weekly basis, with train numbers 05479 and 05480. The train passes through West Bengal, Bihar, Jharkhand, Odisha, Andhra Pradesh, and Telangana. The train starts from Alipurduar Junction at 22:30 on Friday and reaches Secunderabad at 16:15 on Sunday. During its journey the train travels through cities including Alipurduar, Siliguri, Malda, Kolkata, Kharagpur, Cuttack, Bhubaneswar, Vizianagaram, Visakhapatnam, Rajahmundry, Vijayawada, Guntur and Hyderabad.

== Route ==
- WEST BENGAL
1. Alipurduar Junction
2. Hasimara
3. Binnaguri Junction
4. New Mal Junction
5. New Jalpaiguri (Siliguri)
6. Malda Town
7. Rampurhat Junction
8. Dankuni Junction
9. Kharagpur Junction
- BIHAR
1. Kishanganj
- ODISHA
1. Balasore
2. Bhadrak
3. Cuttack Junction
4. Bhubaneswar
5. Khurda Road
6. Brahmapur
- ANDHRA PRADESH
1. Srikakulam Road
2. Vizianagaram Junction
3. Visakhapatnam Junction
4. Duvvada
5. Rajahmundry
6. Vijayawada Junction
7. Guntur Junction
- TELANGANA
1. Secunderabad
- NOTE: The train also passes through Pakur district and Sahibganj district of Jharkhand, but doesn't stop there.

== Reversal ==
The train reverses direction at Visakhapatnam Junction of Andhra Pradesh.

== Locomotive ==
The train is hauled by WDP4 locomotive of Diesel Loco Shed, Siliguri from Alipurduar Junction to New Jalpaiguri. From New Jalpaiguri the train is hauled by WAP5 Electric locomotive of Electric Loco Shed, Howrah up to Visakhapatnam Junction. From there onwards it is hailed by WAP5 locomotive of Electric Loco Shed, Visakhapatnam.
