= Siliguri–Alipurduar Intercity Express =

Siliguri Junction - Alipurduar Junction Intercity Express
Overview
- Service type: Express
- Locale: West Bengal
- First service: 23 March 2004; 22 years ago
- Current operator: Northeast Frontier Railway zone

Route
- Termini: Siliguri Junction; Alipurduar Junction
- Stops: 21
- Distance travelled: 161 km (100 mi)
- Average journey time: 4 hours 22 mins
- Service frequency: Daily
- Train number: 15767 / 15768

On-board services
- Class: general unreserved
- Seating arrangements: Yes
- Sleeping arrangements: Yes
- Catering facilities: No

Technical
- Rolling stock: Standard Indian Railways ICF coaches
- Track gauge: 1,676 mm (5 ft 6 in)
- Operating speed: 37 km/h (23 mph)

The 15767 / 68 Siliguri Junction - Alipurduar Junction Intercity Express is an Express train belonging to Indian Railways Northeast Frontier Railway zone that runs between Siliguri Junction and Alipurduar Junction in India.

It operates as train number 15767 from Siliguri Junction to Alipurduar Junction and as train number 15768 in the reverse direction serving the states of West Bengal.

== Coaches ==
The 15767 / 68 Siliguri Junction - Alipurduar Junction Intercity Express has nine general unreserved and two SLR (seating with luggage rake) coaches. It does not carry a pantry car coach.

As is customary with most train services in India, coach composition may be amended at the discretion of Indian Railways depending on demand.

== Service ==
The 15767 Siliguri Junction - Alipurduar Junction Intercity Express covers the distance of 161 km (100 mi) in 4 hours 45 mins (34 km/h) and in 4 hours 00 mins as the 15768 Alipurduar Junction - Siliguri Junction Intercity Express (40 km/h).

As the average speed of the train is lower than 55 km/h (34 mph), as per railway rules, its fare doesn't include a Superfast surcharge.

== Routing ==
The 15767 / 68 Siliguri Junction - Alipurduar Junction Intercity Express runs from

- Siliguri Junction via
- Gulma
- Sevoke
  - Sevoke Railway Bridge
- Bagrakote
- Odlabari
- Damdim
- New Malbazar
- Chalsa
- Nagrakata
- Carron, West Bengal
- Banarhat
- Binnaguri
- Dalgaon
- Madarihat
- Hasimara
- Hamiltonganj
- Kalchini
- Rajabhatkhawa to
- Alipurduar Junction in West Bengal.

== Traction ==
As the route is going to electrification, a Malda Town based WDM-3D diesel locomotive pulls the train to its destination.

== Incidents ==
On 2002 February 8, Siliguri–Alipurduar Intercity Express train killed one female elephant and injured two tuskers at Chapramari Wildlife Sanctuary between Malbazar and Nagrakata.
