= Banarhat railway station =

Railway station in West Bengal, India

Banarhat Railway Station

General information
- Location: NH 31C, banarhat, Doors, Dist - Jalpaiguri State: West Bengal; India
- Coordinates: 26.78814°N 89.0408°E
- Elevation: 161 metres (528 ft)
- System: Indian Railways Station
- Owner: Indian Railways
- Operator: Northeast Frontier Railway zone
- Line: New Jalpaiguri–Alipurduar–Samuktala Road line
- Platforms: 2
- Tracks: 3 (broad gauge)

Construction
- Structure type: At grade
- Parking: Available

Other information
- Status: Functioning
- Station code: BNQ
- Zone(s): Northeast Frontier Railway zone
- Division(s): Alipurduar
Location
- Location within West Bengal Location within India

Banarhat railway station is the railway station which serves the town of Banarhat in the Indian state of West Bengal. It lies in the New Jalpaiguri–Alipurduar–Samuktala Road line of Northeast Frontier Railway zone, Alipurduar railway division. This railway station also serves the town of Samtse, Bhutan which is around 18 kilometres away by road from Banarhat railway station.

== Trains ==
Major trains running from Banarhat Railway Station are as follows:

- Sealdah-Alipurduar Kanchan Kanya Express
- New Jalpaiguri–Alipurduar Tourist Express
- Siliguri Bamanhat Intercity Express.
- Siliguri–Alipurduar Intercity Express
- Siliguri–Dhubri Intercity Express
