= Siliguri–Bamanhat Express =

Indian superfast train

Siliguri Junction - Bamanhat Express
Overview
- Service type: Express
- Locale: West Bengal
- First service: 27 March 2010; 15 years ago
- Current operator: Northeast Frontier Railway zone

Route
- Termini: Siliguri Junction; Bamanhat
- Stops: 14
- Distance travelled: 233 km (145 mi)
- Service frequency: Daily
- Train number: 15467 / 15468

On-board services
- Classes: General unreserved Second sitting
- Seating arrangements: Yes
- Sleeping arrangements: Yes
- Catering facilities: No

Technical
- Rolling stock: Standard Indian Railways Coaches
- Track gauge: 1,676 mm (5 ft 6 in)
- Operating speed: 34 km/h (21 mph)

The 15467 / 68 Siliguri Junction -Bamanhat Express is an Express train belonging to Indian Railways Northeast Frontier Railway zone that runs between Siliguri Junction and Bamanhat of West Bengal in India.

AS OF 11TH MARCH 2026, THIS TRAIN IS NOW EXTENDED UPTO HALDIBARI ALONG WITH HALTS AT Jalpaiguri and Belakoba and it reverses it's direction at New Jalpaiguri Junction to go Bamanhat via Siliguri Junction

== Timings ==
It operates as train number 15467 from Platform Number 01 of Siliguri Junction at 06:45 and reaches Platform Number 01 of Bamanhat at 13:40. As train number 15468 it starts from Bamanhat at 09:30 and reaches Platform Number 01 of Siliguri Junction at 18:15. The train travels entirely in West Bengal.

== Coaches ==
The 15467 / 68 Siliguri Junction - Bamanhat Express has nine general unreserved & two SLR (seating with luggage rake) coaches . It does not carry a pantry car coach.

As is customary with most train services in India, coach composition may be amended at the discretion of Indian Railways depending on demand.

== Traction ==
The train is hauled by WDP-4D/WDP-4/WDP-4B Locomotive of Diesel Loco Shed, Siliguri for its entire journey from Siliguri Junction to Bamanhat.

== Routing ==
The 15467 / 68 Siliguri Junction - Bamanhat Express runs from

- Siliguri Junction via
- Gulma
- Sivok Junction
- Bagrakote Railway Station
- Odlabari Railway Station
- Damdim Railway Station
- New Malbazar Junction
- Nagrakata
- Banarhat Railway Station
- Binnaguri Junction
- Dalgaon Railway Station
- Hasimara Railway Station
- Hamiltonganj
- Alipurduar Junction
- New Cooch Behar Junction
- Dewanhat Railway Station
- Dinhata railway station to
- Bamanhat railway station.

== Rake sharing ==
The train shares its rake with Balurghat–Siliguri Intercity Express.
