= Nagrakata =

Town in West Bengal, India

- Village
- Location in West Bengal, India Nagrakata (India) Nagrakata (Asia)
- Coordinates: 26.8869°N 88.9067°E
- Country: India
- State: West Bengal
- District: Jalpaiguri
- Elevation: 214 m (702 ft)

Languages
  - Official: Bengali
  - Additional official: English
- Time zone: UTC+5:30 (IST)
- PIN: 735225
- Telephone code: 03565
- Vehicle registration: WB
- Coastline: 0 kilometres (0 mi)
- Nearest city: Siliguri
- Lok Sabha constituency: Alipurduars
- Vidhan Sabha constituency: Nagrakata
- Website: jalpaiguri.gov.in

Nagrakata is a village in the Nagrakata community development block in the Malbazar subdivision of the Jalpaiguri district, West Bengal.National Highway 17 passes through Nagrakata. It is a station on the New Jalpaiguri-Alipurduar-Samuktala Road Line.

== Geography ==
Places and tea estates in Malbabazar subdivision (including Mal, Nagrakata and Matiali CD blocks) in Jalpaiguri district
CT: census town, R: rural/ urban centre, N: neighbourhood, NP: national park/ wildlife sanctuary, TE: tea estate
Abbreviations used in names – TG for Tea Garden (town/village), TE for Tea Estate, JRS: junction railway station
Owing to space constraints in the small map, the actual locations in a larger map may vary slightly

=== Location ===
It is located at 26.8869°N 88.9067°E at an elevation of 214 m above mean sea level.

National Highway 31C passes through Nagrakata. It is a station on the New Jalpaiguri-Alipurduar-Samuktala Road Line.

=== Area overview ===
Gorumara National Park has overtaken Jaldapara National Park in footfall. The Malbazar subdivision is presented in the map alongside. It is a predominantly rural area, with 88.62% of the population living in rural areas and 11.32% living in urban areas. Tea gardens in the Dooars and Terai regions produce 226 million kg of India's total tea crop. Some tea gardens were identified in the 2011 census as census towns or villages.

== Civic administration ==
The Nagrakata police station has jurisdiction over a part of the community development block, and the village serves as the headquarters of the Nagrakata community development block.

== Demographics ==
According to the 2011 Census of India, Nagrakata had a total population of 150000. There were 70500 (50%) males and 70500 (50%) females. There were 9000 persons in the age range of 0 to 6 years. The total number of literate people in Nagrakata was 70500 (50% of the population over 6 years).

== Transport ==
Nagrakata Railway Station serves the village and nearby areas, which lies in the New Jalpaiguri–Alipurduar–Samuktala Road line of Northeast Frontier Railway, Alipurduar railway division.
