= Dalgaon railway station =

Railway station in Birpara, West Bengal, India

Dalgaon Railway Station

General information
- Location: NH - 17, Birpara, Ph:03563-266013, Dist : Alipurduar State: West Bengal; India
- Coordinates: 26.7058°N 89.1373°E
- Elevation: 110.033 metres (361.00 ft)
- System: Indian Railways Station
- Owner: Indian Railways
- Operator: Northeast Frontier Railway zone
- Line: New Jalpaiguri–Alipurduar–Samuktala Road line
- Platforms: 2
- Tracks: 3 (broad gauge)

Construction
- Structure type: At grade
- Parking: Available

Other information
- Status: Functioning
- Station code: DLO
- Zone(s): Northeast Frontier Railway zone
- Division(s): Alipurduar

History
- Electrified: Yes (2023)
Location
- Location within West Bengal Location within India

Dalgaon railway station serves the town of Birpara in the Indian state of West Bengal. It lies in the New Jalpaiguri–Alipurduar–Samuktala Road line of Northeast Frontier Railway zone, Alipurduar railway division.

== Trains ==
Major trains running from Dalgaon Railway Station are as follows:

- Udaipur City–Kamakhya Kavi Guru Express
- Jhajha–Dibrugarh Weekly Express
- Delhi-Alipurduar Mahananda Express
- Sealdah-Alipurduar Kanchan Kanya Express
- Kamakhya–Arrah Junction Capital Express
- Siliguri Bamanhat Intercity Express.
- Siliguri–Alipurduar Intercity Express
- Siliguri–Dhubri Intercity Express
