= Alipurduar Junction railway station =

Railway Station in West Bengal, India

Alipurduar Junction
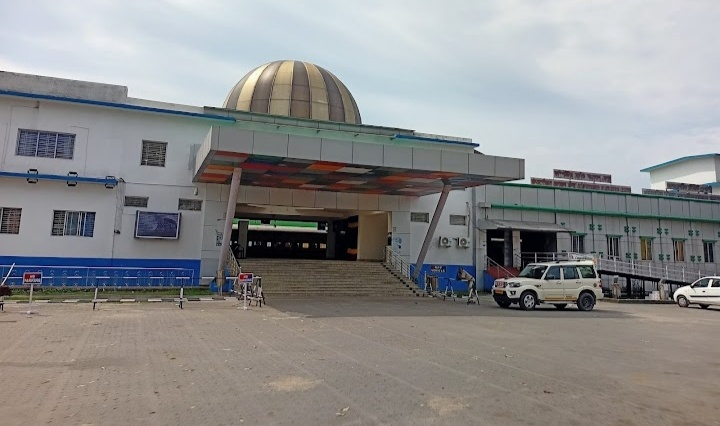
- Alipurduar Junction railway station

General information
- Location: BF Road, Alipurduar, West Bengal; India
- Coordinates: 26.5237°N 89.5335°E
- Elevation: 53 metres (174 ft)
- System: Regional Rail & Light Rail Station
- Owner: Indian Railways
- Operator: Northeast Frontier Railway
- Lines: New Jalpaiguri–Alipurduar–Samuktala Road line; Alipurduar–Bamanhat branch line
- Platforms: 5
- Tracks: 12
- Connections: Auto-rickshaw & E-rickshaw

Construction
- Structure type: At grade
- Parking: Available
- Cycle facilities: Available
- Accessible: Yes

Other information
- Status: Functioning
- Station code: APDJ
- Zone(s): North East Frontier Railway
- Division(s): Alipurduar

History
- Opened: 1901; 125 years ago
- Former names: Cooch Behar State Railway; Assam Bengal Railway

Passengers
- 30,000 per day (▲ high)
Location
- Location within West Bengal

Alipurduar Junction is one of the four railway stations that serve Alipurduar city in Alipurduar district in the Indian state of West Bengal. Its station code is APDJ and it lies in New Jalpaiguri–Alipurduar–Samuktala Road line and Alipurduar–Bamanhat branch line. An adjacent railway junction is New Alipurduar (station code NOQ).

== History ==
The Cooch Behar State Railway built a 2 ft 6 in (762 mm) narrow-gauge railway from Geetaldaha on the Eastern Bengal Railway to Jainti in 1901. The line passed through Alipurduar. It was converted to 1,000 mm (3 ft 3 3/8 in) metre gauge in 1910.

With the partition of India in 1947, railway links of Assam and the Indian part of North Bengal, earlier passing through the eastern part of Bengal, were completely cut off from the rest of India. The Assam Rail Link project was taken up on 26 January 1948 to construct a 229-kilometre-long (142 mi) 1,000 mm (3 ft 3 3/8 in) metre-gauge railway linking Fakiragram with Kishanganj in Bihar via Alipurduar. The first train ran on the route on 26 January 1950. The route was converted to 5 ft 6 in (1,676 mm) broad gauge in 2003–2006.

Now all the railway tracks in Alipurduar city are broad gauge.

== Connections ==
There are multiple trains originating and halting in Alipurduar railway station, they are as follows:

- Sir M Visvesvaraya Terminal - Alipurduar Amrit Bharat Express
- Panvel–Alipurduar Amrit Bharat Express
- Dr. Ambedkar Nagar–Kamakhya Express
- Lokmanya Tilak Terminus–Kamakhya Karmabhoomi Express
- Kamakhya–Anand Vihar Express
- Udaipur City–Kamakhya Kavi Guru Express
- New Jalpaiguri–Alipurduar Tourist Express
- Ranchi–Kamakhya Express
- Puri–Kamakhya Express via Howrah
- Delhi Junction - Alipurduar Mahananda Express
- Sealdah - Alipurduar Kanchan Kanya Express
- Kamakhya–Arrah Junction Capital Express
- Jhajha–Dibrugarh Express
- Alipurduar - Secunderabad Express
- Alipurduar–Silghat Town Rajya Rani Express
- Siliguri Junction - Alipurduar Intercity Express
- Siliguri Junction - Dhubri Intercity Express
- Siliguri Junction - Bamanhat Express
- Alipurduar–Lumding Intercity Express
- Alipurduar–Kamakhya Intercity Express

== Other adjacent stations ==
Two adjacent local railway stations are Alipurduar (station code APD) and Alipurduar Court (station code APDC). Long-distance trains do not stop there.

Most of the long-distance trains from other parts of India pass through and stop at New Alipurduar railway junction (station code NOQ) constructed in the early 1950s as it is connected with double track to Assam and the rest of Bengal. The older Alipurduar station was on metre-gauge track that was converted to broad gauge much later in 2006 and fewer trains pass through Alipurduar station.

The two junctions are on different lines and only one short-distance train Alipurduar–Kamakhya InterCity Express (train number 15471) runs between the two junctions.

Northeast Frontier Railway converted the Alipurduar–Bamanhat branch line to 5 ft 6 in (1,676 mm) broad gauge in 2007.

== See also ==
- North Eastern Railway Connectivity Project
- North Western Railway zone
- Panvel–Alipurduar Amrit Bharat Express
