= Kalchini railway station =

Railway station in West Bengal, India

Kalchini

General information
- Location: NH 31C/SH12A, Hamiltonganj, Alipurduar 735217 State: West Bengal; India
- Coordinates: 26.692778°N 89.471667°E
- Elevation: 115 metres (377 ft)
- System: Indian Railways Station
- Owner: Indian Railways
- Operator: Northeast Frontier Railway zone
- Line: New Jalpaiguri–Alipurduar–Samuktala Road line
- Platforms: 2
- Tracks: 3 (broad gauge)

Construction
- Structure type: At grade
- Parking: Available

Other information
- Status: Functioning
- Station code: KCF
- Zone(s): Northeast Frontier Railway zone
- Division(s): Alipurduar
Location
- Location within West Bengal Location within India

Kalchini railway station serves the town of Kalchini, lying on Doars region in the Indian state of West Bengal.The station lies on New Jalpaiguri–Alipurduar–Samuktala Road line of Northeast Frontier Railway zone, Alipurduar railway division. Major Trains like New Jalpaiguri–Alipurduar Tourist Express, Siliguri–Alipurduar Intercity Express Siliguri–Dhubri Intercity Express etc. are available from this station.
