= Chalsa railway station =

Railway station in West Bengal

Chalsa Railway Station

General information
- Location: NH - 17, Chalsa, Dist - Jalpaiguri State: West Bengal; India
- Coordinates: 26.88°N 88.78°E
- Elevation: 163 metres (535 ft)
- System: Indian Railways Station
- Owner: Indian Railways
- Operator: Northeast Frontier Railway zone
- Line: New Jalpaiguri–Alipurduar–Samuktala Road line
- Platforms: 2
- Tracks: 3 (broad gauge)

Construction
- Structure type: At grade
- Parking: Available

Other information
- Status: Functioning
- Station code: CLD
- Zone(s): Northeast Frontier Railway zone
- Division(s): Alipurduar
Location
- Location within West Bengal Location within India

Chalsa Railway Station is the railway station which serves the town of Chalsa, Doars region in the Indian state of West Bengal. The station lies on New Jalpaiguri–Alipurduar–Samuktala Road line of Northeast Frontier Railway zone, Alipurduar railway division. Chalsa is also the initial station of the Chalsa - Matelli - Naxal line which is currently undergoing gauge conversion and is under construction. Major trains like New Jalpaiguri–Alipurduar Tourist Special, Siliguri–Alipurduar Intercity Express etc. are available from this station.

== See also ==
- Matelli railway station
- Naxal railway station
