= Jhajha–Dibrugarh Weekly Express =

Train in the Northeast Frontier Railway zone, India

Overview
- Service type: Express
- Locale: Assam, Nagaland, West Bengal, Jharkhand and Bihar
- First service: 29 October 2004; 21 years ago
- Current operator: Northeast Frontier Railway zone

Route
- Termini: Jhajha (JAJ); Dibrugarh (DBRG)
- Stops: 30
- Distance travelled: 1,691 km (1,051 mi)
- Average journey time: 37h 50m
- Service frequency: Weekly (Note: Runs one day in a week for every direction.)
- Train number: 15941/15942

On-board services
- Classes: Second AC (1), third AC (3), sleeper (8), general unreserved (6) and generator cum luggage van (2)
- Seating arrangements: No
- Sleeping arrangements: Yes
- Catering facilities: On-board catering E-catering
- Observation facilities: LHB coach
- Entertainment facilities: No
- Baggage facilities: Yes
- Other facilities: Below the seats

Technical
- Rolling stock: 2
- Track gauge: 1,676 mm (5 ft 6 in)
- Operating speed: 45 km/h (28 mph), including halts
Route map
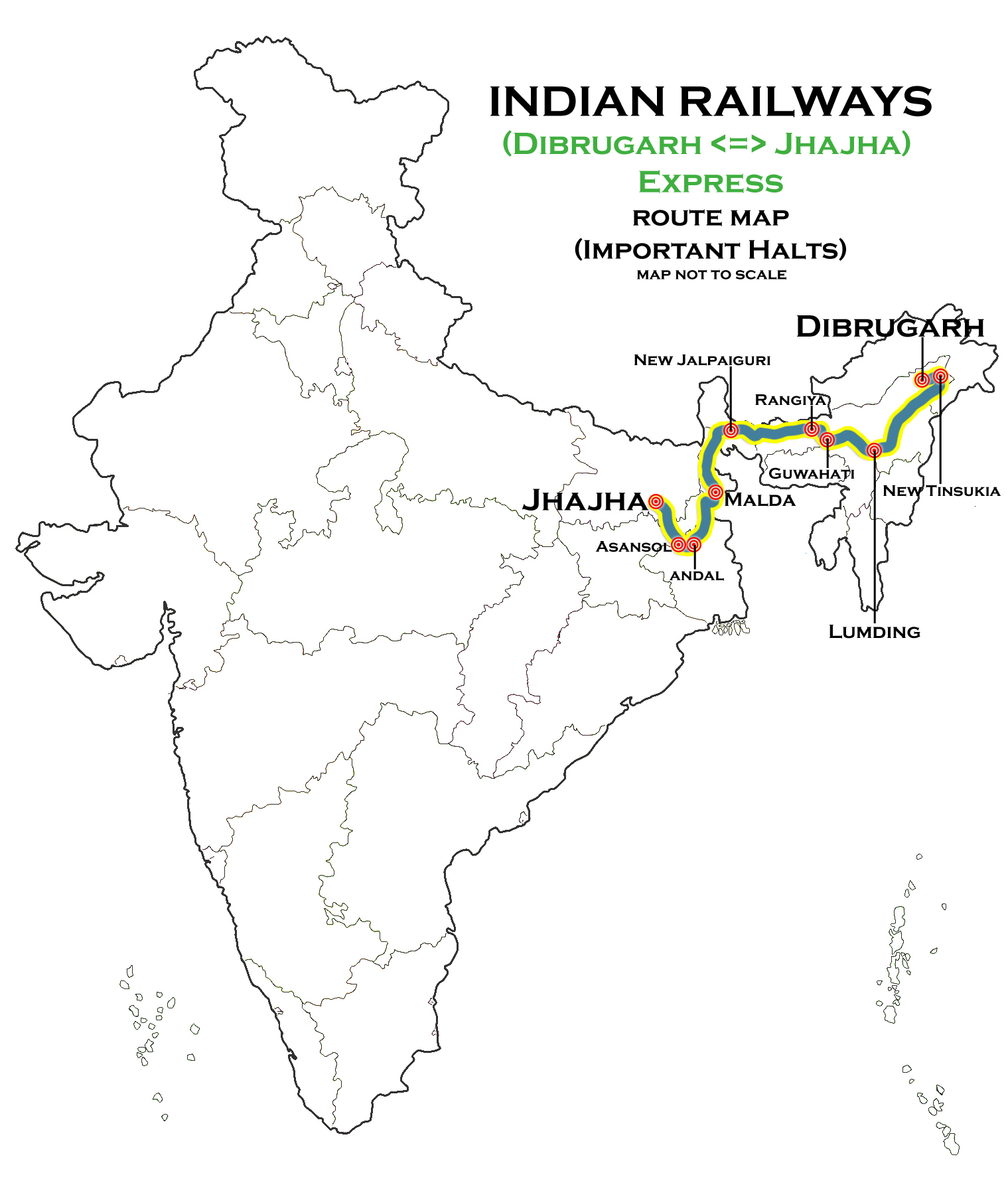

The Jhajha–Dibrugarh Weekly Express is an express train belonging to Northeast Frontier Railway zone that runs between Jhajha and Dibrugarh in India, covering the states of Jharkhand, Bihar, West Bengal, Nagaland and Assam via Asansol, Rampurhat, Malda Town, New Jalpaiguri, Guwahati. It operates with 15941/15942 train numbers on a weekly basis.

== Service ==
The 15941/Jhajha–Dibrugarh Weekly Express had an average speed of 45 km/h and covered 1691 km in 37h 50m. The 15942/Dibrugarh–Jhajha Weekly Express had an average speed of 47 km/h and covered 1691 km in 36h 20m. The service was permanently cancelled effective December 24, 2021.

== Route and halts ==
The important halts of the train are:

BIHAR

- Jhajha (starts)
- Barsoi Junction
- Kishanganj

JHARKHAND

- Jasidih Junction
- Madhupur Junction
- Chittaranjan
- Pakur

WEST BENGAL

- **Asansol Junction**
- Andal
- **Durgapur**
- Siuri
- Sainthia Junction
- **Rampurhat Junction**
- New Farakka Junction
- **Malda Town**
- **New Jalpaiguri Junction**
- **Siliguri Junction**
- New Malbazar Junction
- Dalgaon
- **Alipurduar Junction**

NAGALAND

- Dimapur

ASSAM

- Gossaigaon Hat
- New Bongaigaon Junction
- Goalpara
- **Kamakhya Junction**
- **Guwahati**
- Lanka
- Lumding Junction
- Diphu
- Mariani Junction
- New Tinsukia Junction
- **Dibrugarh** (ends)

Note: Bold text indicates major railway stations/major cities.

== Coach composition ==
The train has LHB rakes with a maximum speed of 110 km/h. It consists of 20 coaches:

- 1 AC II Tier
- 3 AC III Tier
- 8 sleeper coaches
- 6 general unreserved
- 2 luggage cum generator car

== Traction ==
Both trains are hauled by an Electric Loco Shed, Howrah-based WAP-4 Locomotive from Jhajha to Durgapur. From Durgapur, the train is hauled by a Diesel Loco Shed, Siliguri-based WDP-4D/WDP-4/WDP-4B locomotive until Dibrugarh and vice versa.

== Direction reversal ==
The train reverses its direction one time:

- Durgapur

== See also ==
- Jhajha railway station
- Dibrugarh railway station
- Rangiya–Dibrugarh Express
