= Dr. Ambedkar Nagar–Kamakhya Weekly Express =

Train in the Western Railway zone, India

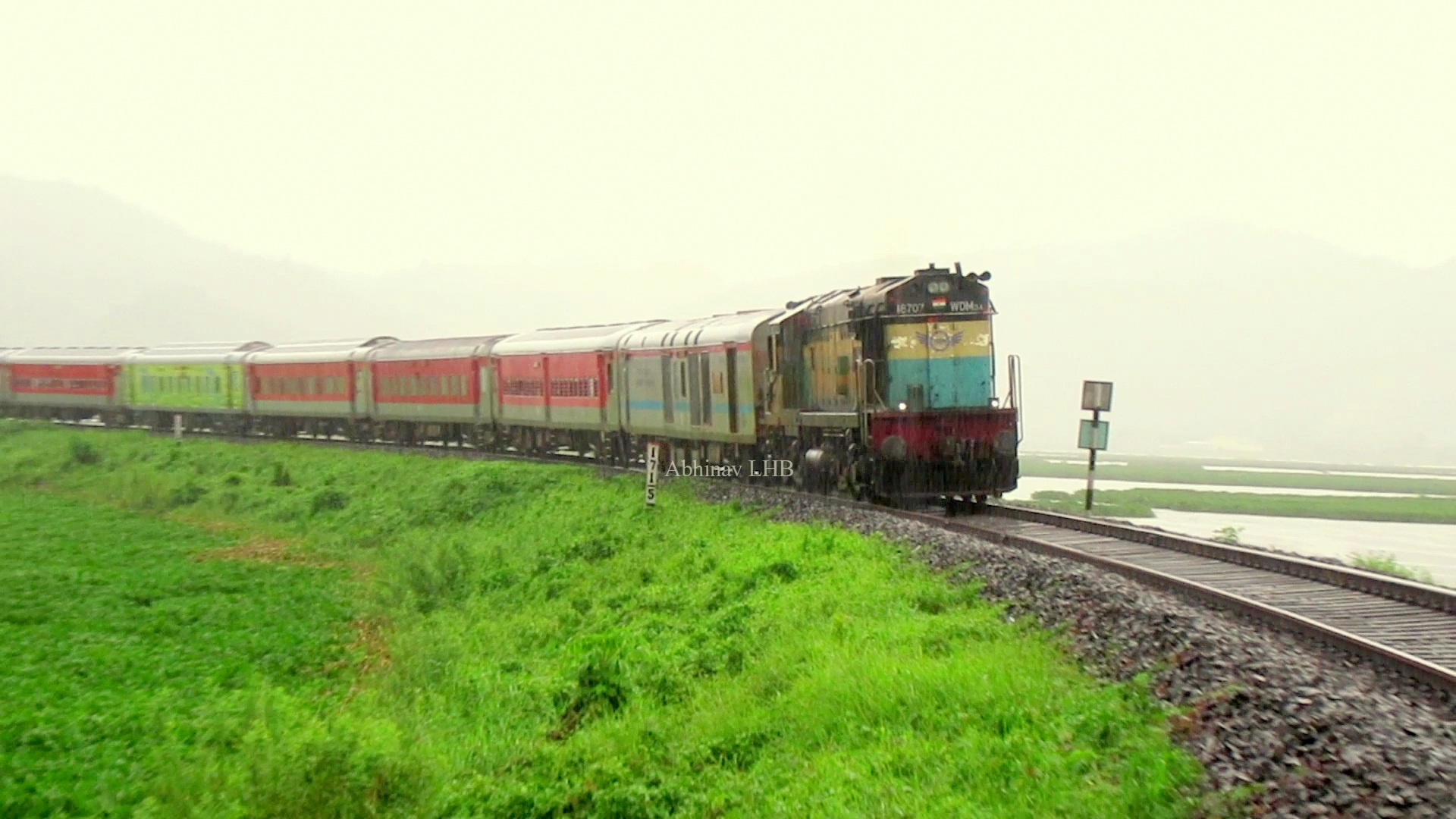
- Indore–Guwahati Express (LHB) with Ratlam ALCo WDM-3A at Deepor Beel Lake

Overview
- Service type: Express
- Locale: Madhya Pradesh, Uttar Pradesh, Bihar, West Bengal and Assam
- First service: 7 July 2017; 8 years ago
- Current operator: Western Railway

Route
- Termini: Dr. Ambedkar Nagar (DADN); Kamakhya Junction (KYQ)
- Stops: 33
- Distance travelled: 2,298 km (1,428 mi)
- Average journey time: 47 hrs 50 mins
- Service frequency: Weekly (Note: Runs one day in a week for every direction.)
- Train number: 19305/19306

On-board services
- Classes: AC 2 tier, AC 3 tier, sleeper class, general unreserved
- Seating arrangements: Yes
- Sleeping arrangements: Yes
- Catering facilities: On-board catering E-catering
- Observation facilities: LHB coach
- Entertainment facilities: No
- Baggage facilities: No
- Other facilities: Below the seats

Technical
- Rolling stock: 2
- Track gauge: 1,676 mm (5 ft 6 in)
- Operating speed: 48 km/h (30 mph), including halts

The Dr. Ambedkar Nagar–Kamakhya Weekly Express is an Express train belonging to Western Railway zone that runs between Dr. Ambedkar Nagar of Indore, Madhya Pradesh and Kamakhya Junction of Guwahati, Assam in India. It is currently being operated with 19305/19306 train numbers on a weekly basis.

== Coach composition ==
The train has standard LHB rakes with a maximum speed of 110 km/h. The train consists of 22 coaches:

- 1 AC II Tier
- 3 AC III Tier
- 11 sleeper class
- 4 general unreserved
- 1 pantry car
- 2 end-on generators

== Service ==
- 19305/ Indore–Kamakhya Weekly Express has an average speed of 47 km/h and covers 2271 km in 47 hrs 50 mins.
- 19306/ Kamakhya–Indore Weekly Express has an average speed of 48 km/h and covers 2271 km in 47 hrs 40 mins.

== Route and halts ==
The important halts of the train are:

MADHYA PRADESH

- Dr. Ambedkar Nagar (starts)
- Indore Junction
- Dewas Junction
- Ujjain Junction
- Shujalpur
- Bairagarh
- Vidisha
- Bina Junction

UTTAR PRADESH

- Lalitpur Junction
- Jhansi Junction
- Orai
- Kanpur Central
- Lucknow Charbagh
- Sultanpur Junction
- Jaunpur City
- Varanasi Junction
- Aunrihar Junction
- Ghazipur City
- Ballia

BIHAR

- Chhapra Junction
- Sonpur Junction
- Hajipur Junction
- Begusarai
- Khagaria Junction
- Katihar Junction
- Kishanganj

WEST BENGAL

- New Jalpaiguri (Siliguri)
- New Mal Junction
- Binnaguri Junction
- Hasimara Railway Station
- Alipurduar Junction

ASSAM

- Kokrajhar
- New Bongaigaon Junction
- Kamakhya Junction (ends)

== Schedule ==
Train number	Station code	Departure station	Departure time	Departure day	Arrival station	Arrival time	Arrival day
19305	INDB	Dr. Ambedkar Nagar	12:45 PM	Thu	Kamakhya Junction	13:45 PM	Sat
19306	KYQ	Kamakhya Junction	05:35 AM	Sun	Dr. Ambedkar Nagar	06:05 AM	Tue

== Rake sharing ==
The train shares its rake with 12923/12924 Dr. Ambedkar Nagar–Nagpur Superfast Express.

== Direction reversal ==
The train reverses its direction one time:

- Ujjain Junction

== Traction ==
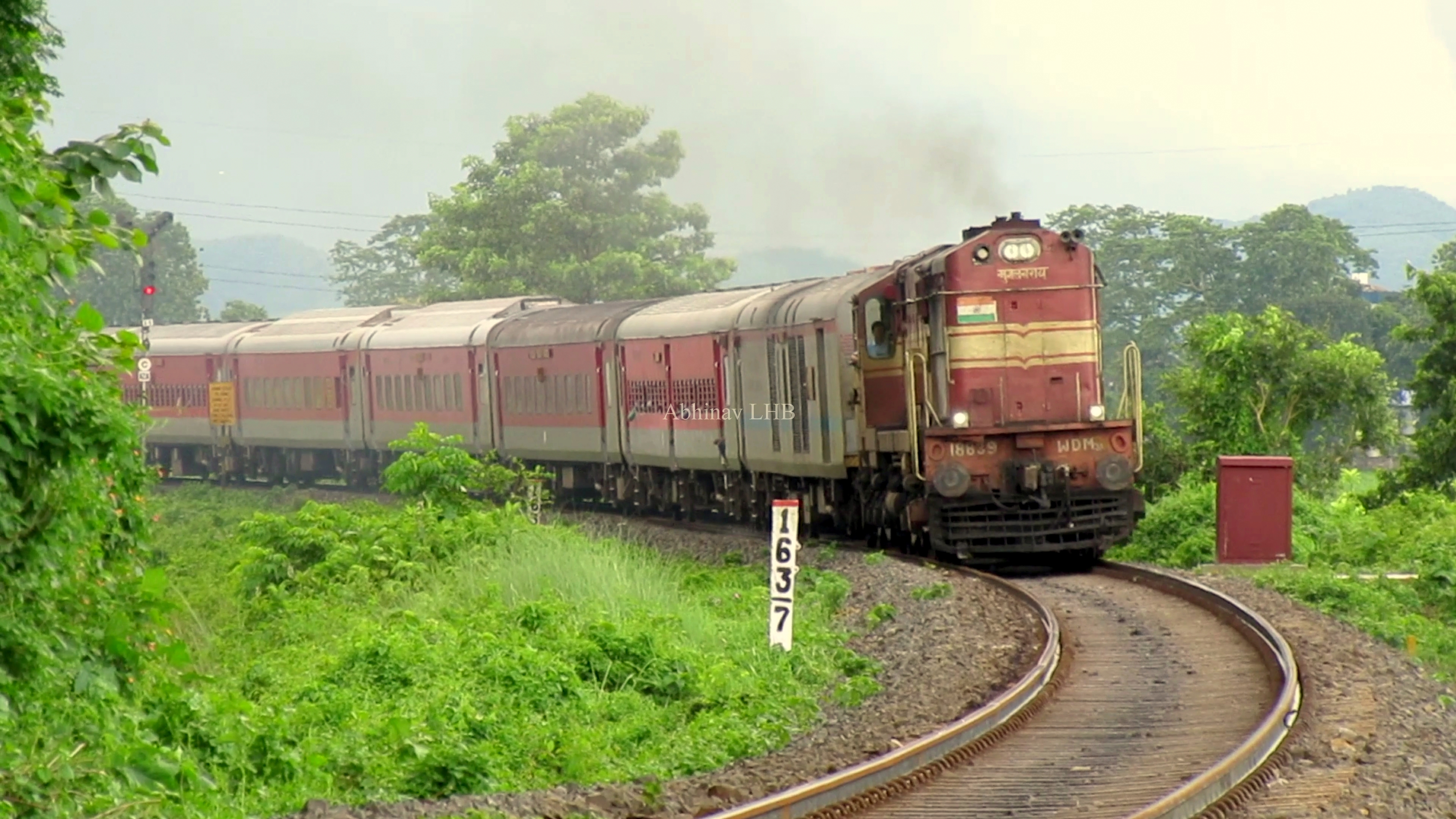
WDM-3A 18839R (MGS) ECR with INDB – GHY Exp

Both trains are hauled by a Ghaziabad Loco Shed or Vadodara Loco Shed-based WAP-7 or WAP-5 electric locomotive between Dr. Ambedkar Nagar and Katihar Junction. After Katihar Junction, both trains are hauled by a Siliguri Loco Shed-based WDP-4D or WDP-4B or WDP-4 diesel locomotive up to Kamakhya Junction, and vice versa.

== See also ==
- Indore Junction railway station
- Guwahati railway station
- Shipra Express
- Indore–Patna Express
- Dr. Ambedkar Nagar–Nagpur Superfast Express
