= Nagrakata railway station =

Railway station in West Bengal, India

Nagrakata Railway Station

General information
- Location: NH - 17, Nagrakata, Pin - 735225, Dist - Jalpaiguri State: West Bengal; India
- Coordinates: 26.8869°N 88.9067°E
- Elevation: 178 metres (584 ft)
- System: Indian Railways Station
- Owner: Indian Railways
- Operator: Northeast Frontier Railway zone
- Line: New Jalpaiguri–Alipurduar–Samuktala Road line
- Platforms: 2
- Tracks: 3 (broad gauge)

Construction
- Structure type: At grade
- Parking: Available

Other information
- Status: Functioning
- Station code: NKB
- Zone(s): Northeast Frontier Railway zone
- Division(s): Alipurduar
Location
- Location within West Bengal Location within India

Nagrakata Railway Station serves the village of Nagrakata in Doars region of Jalpaiguri district of the Indian state of West Bengal. The station lies on New Jalpaiguri–Alipurduar–Samuktala Road line of Northeast Frontier Railway, Alipurduar railway division.

== Trains ==
Following trains are available from Nagrakata railway station:

- Delhi Junction - Alipurduar Mahananda Express
- Siliguri Junction - Alipurduar Intercity Express
- Siliguri Junction - Dhubri Intercity Express
- Siliguri Junction - Bamanhat Express.
- 55725 - Alipurduar–New Jalpaiguri Passenger
- 55467 - Bamanhat–Siliguri Passenger
- 75743 - Siliguri junction - Dhubri DEMU
- 05777 - New Jalpaiguri–Alipurduar Passenger special
- 75717 - Siliguri Junction - Bamanhat DEMU
- 75741- Dhubri - Siliguri DEMU Intercity Express
