= Lokmanya Tilak Terminus–Kamakhya Karmabhoomi Express =

Train in India

Mumbai LTT–Kamakhya Karmabhoomi Express

Overview
- Service type: Superfast
- First service: 24 December 2010; 15 years ago
- Current operator: Northeast Frontier Railway

Route
- Termini: Mumbai LTT; Kamakhya (KYQ)
- Stops: 25
- Distance travelled: 2,952 km (1,834 mi)
- Average journey time: 50 hours 15 minutes
- Service frequency: Weekly
- Train number: 22511 / 22512

On-board services
- Classes: AC 2 Tier, AC 3 Tier, Sleeper Class, General Unreserved (Deen Dayalu)
- Seating arrangements: Yes
- Sleeping arrangements: Yes
- Catering facilities: Available
- Observation facilities: Large windows
- Baggage facilities: No
- Other facilities: Below the seats

Technical
- Rolling stock: LHB coach
- Track gauge: 1,676 mm (5 ft 6 in)
- Operating speed: 59 km/h (37 mph) average including halts.
Route map
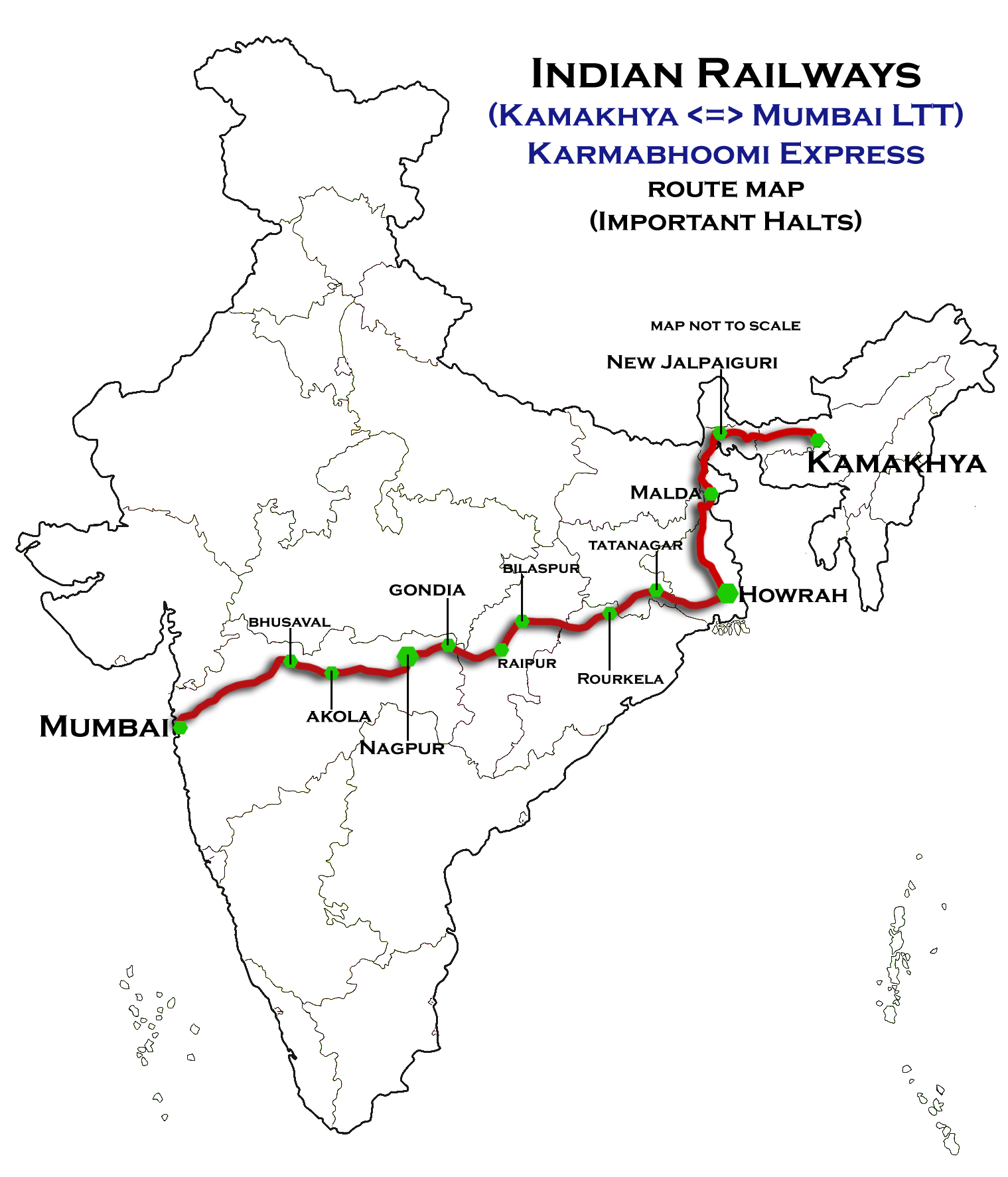

The 22511 / 22512 Mumbai LTT–Kamakhya Karmabhoomi Superfast Express is a Superfast Express train belonging to the Northeast Frontier Zone of Indian Railways that runs between Lokmanya Tilak Terminus (Mumbai, Maharashtra) and Kamakhya Junction (Guwahati, Assam) via New Jalpaiguri, Malda Town, Rampurhat, Kharagpur.

It operates as train number 22511 from Lokmanya Tilak Terminus to Kamakhya Junction and as train number 22512 in the reverse direction, serving the states of Maharashtra, Chhattisgarh, Odisha, Jharkhand, Bihar, West Bengal & Assam.

== Change of train numbers ==
1. 15611 -> 22511
2. 15612 -> 22512

== Coaches ==
The 22511 / 12 Lokmanya Tilak Terminus–Kamakhya Junction Karmabhoomi Express has two AC 2-tier, four AC 3-tier, 8 sleeper class, six general unreserved & two SLR (seating with luggage rake) coaches . It does not carry a pantry car.

As is customary with most train services in India, coach composition may be amended at the discretion of Indian Railways depending on demand.

== Service ==
The 22511 Lokmanya Tilak Terminus–Kamakhya Junction Karmabhoomi Express covers the distance of 2,946 km (1,831 mi) in 54 hours 55 mins (54 km/h) and in 53 hours 15 mins as the 22512 Kamakhya Junction–Lokmanya Tilak Terminus Karmabhoomi Express (55 km/h).

As the average speed of the train is equal to 55 km/h (34 mph), as per railway rules, its fare includes a Superfast surcharge.

== Routing ==
The 22511 / 12 Lokmanya Tilak Terminus–Kamakhya Junction Karmabhoomi Express runs from

MAHARASHTRA

1. Lokmanya Tilak Terminus (Starts)
2. Kalyan Junction
3. Manmad
4. Bhusaval Junction
5. Akola Junction
6. Nagpur Junction
7. Gondia Junction

CHHATISGARH

1. Raipur Junction
2. Bilaspur Junction
3. Raigarh railway station

ODISHA

1. Jharsuguda Junction
2. Rourkela Junction

JHARKHAND

1. Chakradharpur
2. Tatanagar Junction
3. Pakur railway station

WEST BENGAL

1. Kharagpur
2. Dankuni Junction
3. Barddhaman Junction
4. Bolpur Shantiniketan
5. Rampurhat Junction
6. Malda Town
7. New Jalpaiguri
8. Siliguri Junction
9. New Mal Junction
10. Hasimara Railway Station
11. Alipurduar Junction

ASSAM

1. New Bongaigaon
2. Kamakhya Junction (Ends).

== Traction ==
Siliguri Loco Shed - based WAP-7 electric locomotive or WDP-4D diesel locomotive hauls the train from Lokmanya Tilak Terminus to Kamakhya and vice versa.
