= New Jalpaiguri–Alipurduar–Samuktala Road line =

Railway line in West Bengal, India

New Jalpaiguri–Alipurduar–Samuktala Road line (including New Cooch Behar–Golakganj branch line)
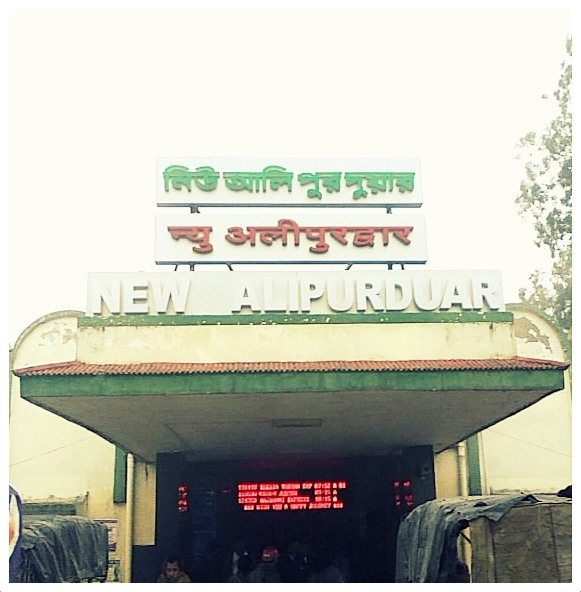
- New Alipurduar Junction an important railway station on New Jalpaiguri–Alipurduar–Samuktala Road line

Overview
- Status: Operational
- Owner: Indian Railways
- Locale: West Bengal
- Termini: New Jalpaiguri; Samuktala Road
- Stations: 24

Service
- Operator(s): Northeast Frontier Railway

History
- Opened: 1950

Technical
- Line length: 182 km (113 mi)
- Track gauge: 1,676 mm (5 ft 6 in)
- Electrification: Yes

The New Jalpaiguri–Alipurduar–Samuktala Road line is a railway line that connects New Jalpaiguri- Siliguri Junction with Alipurduar and Samuktala Road in the Indian state of West Bengal. This railway line passes through the beautiful Doars region, which includes Mahananda Wildlife Sanctuary, Dooars-Terai tea gardens, Sevoke Railway Bridge, River Teesta, River Jaldhaka, River Torsha, Gorumara National Park, Buxa Tiger Reserve, Jaldapara National Park, Chapramari Wildlife Sanctuary, Chilapata Forests, Tunnels, Hills, Valleys etc.

== History ==
Cooch Behar State Railway built the line between Geetaldaha, which connected to Lalmonirhat, and Jainti during 1893–1901. The Eastern Bengal Railway constructed the Hasimara–Alipurduar section during the period 1900–1910. The Bengal Dooars Railway also constructed certain lines in the area. Their longest line was from Lalmonirhat to the western Dooars. Those were metre-gauge railways. The Eastern Bengal Railway and the Assam Bengal Railway were merged during World War II and came to be known as the Bengal Assam Railway. With the partition of India in 1947, the Indian part of Bengal Assam Railway became Assam Railway, which subsequently became part of North Eastern Railway and Northeast Frontier Railway. The metre-gauge track was converted to 1,676 mm (5 ft 6 in) broad gauge. The 182 kilometres (113 mi) long New Jalpaiguri/ Siliguri–Samuktala Road line was constructed as part of the Assam Rail Link project in 1948–50. After conversion to 1,676 mm (5 ft 6 in), it was re-opened on 20 November 2003.

== Locale ==
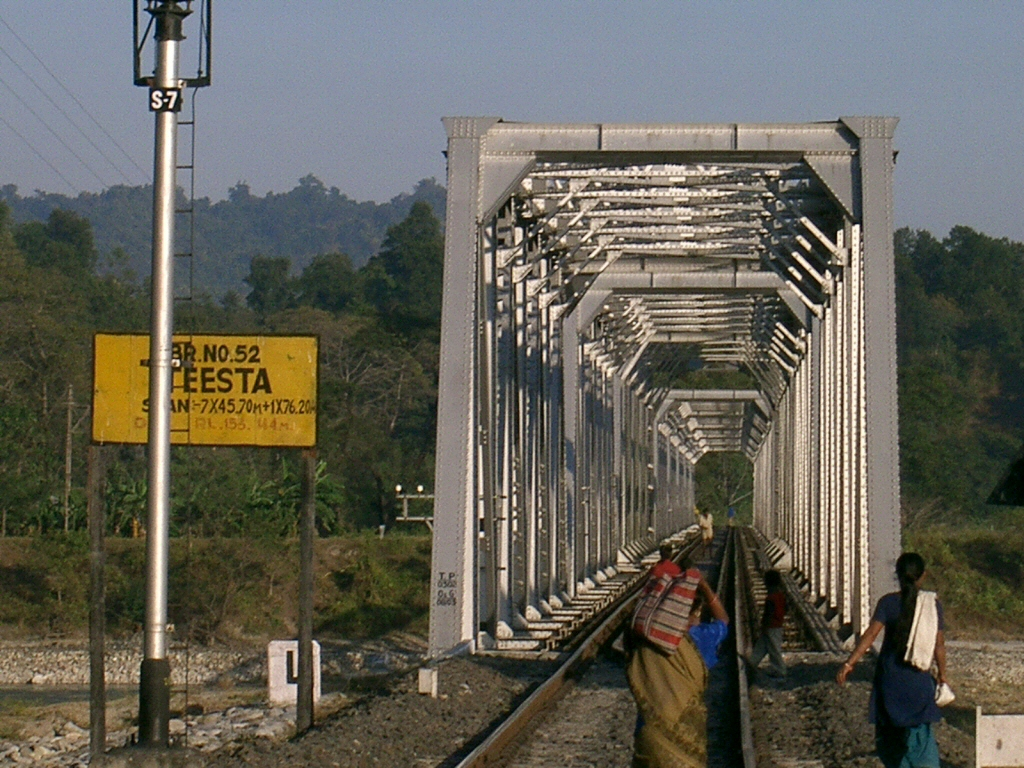
Sevoke Railway Bridge across the Teesta, to the south of the Coronation Bridge

The Dooars or the Himalayan foothills cover a stretch of about 140 km in the northern part of Jalpaiguri district between the Teesta and Sankosh rivers with fields, forests and tea gardens in the backdrop of low hills. Numerous mountain streams criss-cross the region. The Dooars are particularly notable for its forests and wild life sanctuaries – Gorumara National Park, Jaldapara National Park, Chapramari Wildlife Sanctuary, Chilapata Forests, and Buxa Tiger Reserve. The New Jalpaiguri–Alipurduar–Samuktala Road line runs through the area. It also runs through another sanctuary outside the Dooars – Mahananda Wildlife Sanctuary.

=== Elephants ===
The line running through deep forests has taken a toll on elephant herds. A large number of elephants have been killed by speeding trains. Following protests by the local population, restrictions have been placed on the speed of trains, particularly at night.

== Sikkim connection ==
The construction of a new 44.4-kilometre (27.6 mi) long Sevoke-Rangpo Railway Line from Sivok railway station in Sevoke on the New Jalpaiguri–Alipurduar–Samuktala Road line in West Bengal to Rangpo railway station in Rangpo, Sikkim commenced in 2010. The railway line up to Rangpo is expected to be completed in December 2023. In the second phase the line will be extended up to Gangtok, the capital of Sikkim.

== Branch lines ==
The broad gauge branch line i.e New Mal–Changrabandha–New Cooch Behar line from Malbazar in Jalpaiguri district to Changrabandha in Cooch Behar district exists with connecting line to New Cooch Behar. Old metre gauge extension of this line on the Bangladesh side from Burimari to Lalmonirhat is still functional.

The Alipuduar–Bamanhat branch line ends near the India–Bangladesh border across the Dharla River. In pre-independence days, it used to connect to Mogalhat, now in Bangladesh, across the Dharla. The bridge is broken. The line from Golokganj meets the branch line. Before the Dharla bridge was broken the rail link from Parbatipur to Fakiragram used to pass through Geetaldaha, now a border village in Cooch Behar district, and Bamanhat. The Alipurduar–Bamanhat branch line was converted to 1,676 mm (5 ft 6 in) in 2007. Dhubri-New Jalpaiguri Inter-city Express via Cooch Behar was introduced in February 2012.

Rajabhatkawa-Jainti line is a new project sanctioned in 2012–13.

== Important Railway Stations ==
Important railway stations in this line are as follows:

- New Jalpaiguri Junction
- Siliguri Town
- Siliguri Junction
- Gulma
- Sivok Junction
- Bagrakote
- Odlabari
- Damdim
- New Malbazar Junction
- Chalsa
- Chapramari
- Nagrakata
- Carron
- Chengmari
- Banarhat
- Binnaguri
- Dalgaon
- Mujnai
- Madarihat
- Hasimara
- Hamiltonganj
- Kalchini
- Rajabhatkhawa
- Alipurduar Junction
- Salsalabari
- Samuktala Road Junction
