= Alipurduar railway division =

Railway division of India

Alipurduar Railway Division

Overview
- Owner: Northeast Frontier Railway zone
- Locale: Alipurduar, West Bengal, India

Service
- Type: Railway division
- System: Indian Railways

History
- Opened: 15 January 1958; 68 years ago

Alipurduar railway division is one of the five railway divisions under the jurisdiction of Northeast Frontier Railway zone of the Indian Railways. This railway division was formed on 15 January 1958 and its headquarter is located at Alipurduar in the state of West Bengal.

Katihar railway division, Lumding railway division, Tinsukia railway division and Rangiya railway division are the other four railway divisions under the NFR Zone headquartered at Maligaon, Guwahati.

== Sikkim connection ==
The construction of a new 44.4-kilometre (27.6 mi) long Sevoke-Rangpo Railway Line from Sivok railway station in Sevoke on the New Jalpaiguri–Alipurduar–Samuktala Road line in West Bengal to Rangpo railway station in Rangpo, Sikkim commenced in 2010. The railway line up to Rangpo is expected to be completed in 2021. In the second phase the line will be extended up to Gangtok, the capital of Sikkim.

== State-wise route lengths ==
As on 31-03-2024

State	BG		
State	Electrified	Non-Electrified	Total Kms
Assam	62.61	97.49	160.10
West Bengal	432.65	127.57	560.22
Total	495.26	225.06	720.32

== See also ==
- Indian Railways
- Rail transport in India
- Alipurduar Junction railway station
- Zones and divisions of Indian Railways
