= New Jalpaiguri–Amritsar Karmabhoomi Express =

Train in India

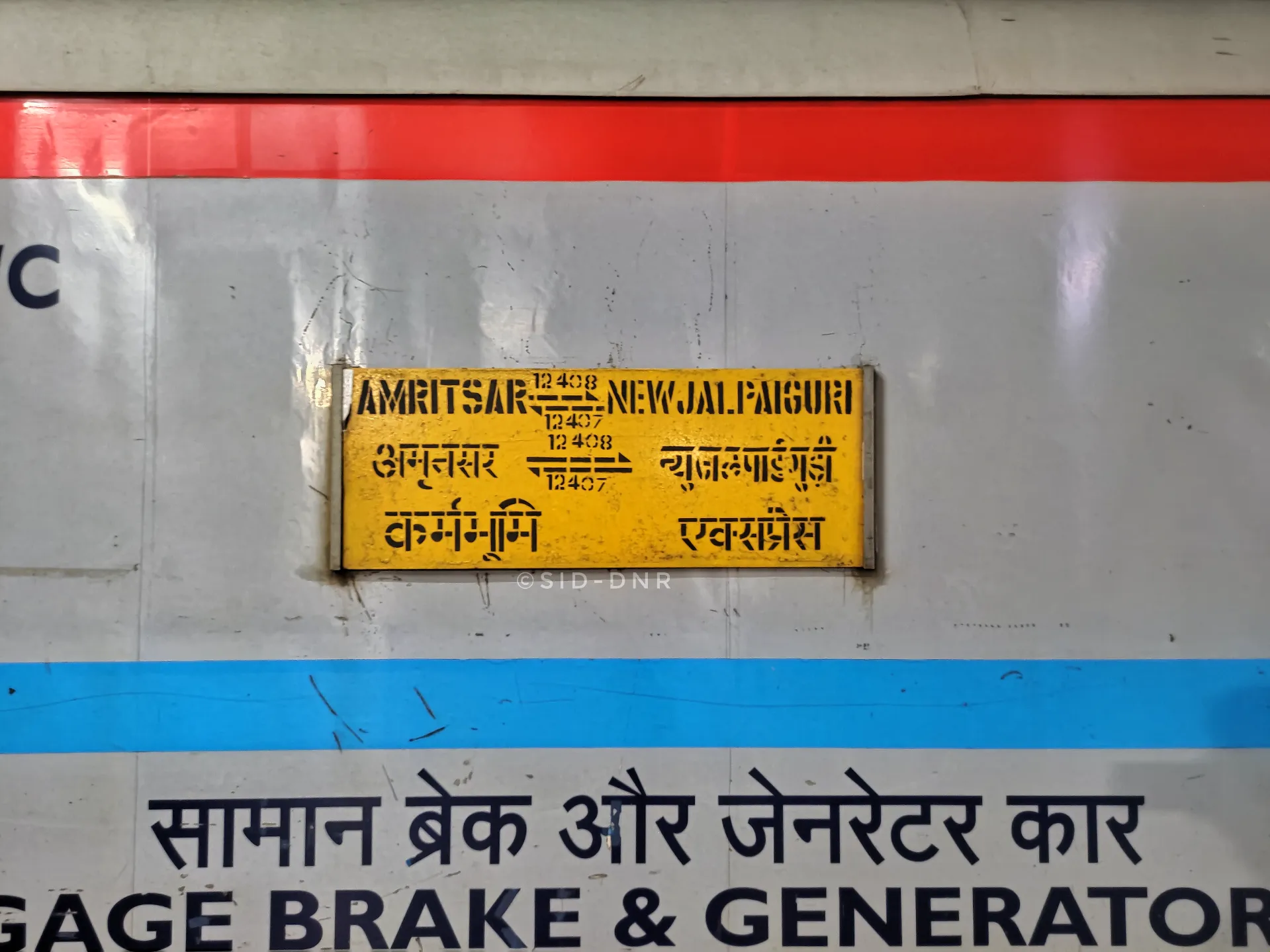
- Karmabhoomi Express train board.

Overview
- Service type: Express
- First service: 29 January 2011; 15 years ago
- Current operator: Northern Railway

Route
- Termini: New Jalpaiguri (NJP); Amritsar (ASR)
- Stops: 17
- Distance travelled: 1,825 km (1,134 mi)
- Average journey time: 33 hours 20 minutes
- Service frequency: Weekly (Note: Runs one days in a week for every direction.)
- Train number: 12407 / 12408

On-board services
- Class: General Unreserved
- Seating arrangements: No
- Sleeping arrangements: Yes
- Catering facilities: No
- Observation facilities: Large windows
- Baggage facilities: Available
- Other facilities: Below the seats

Technical
- Rolling stock: LHB coach
- Track gauge: 1,676 mm (5 ft 6 in)
- Operating speed: 55 km/h (34 mph) average including halts.

The 12407 / 12408 New Jalpaiguri–Amritsar Karmabhoomi Express is an express train of the Indian Railways connecting the cities of Amritsar in Punjab and New Jalpaiguri in West Bengal. It originates from New Jalpaiguri Junction of Siliguri and terminates in Amritsar Junction of Amritsar. It is currently being operated with 12407/12408 train numbers on a weekly basis.

== Service ==
The 12407/New Jalpaiguri–Amritsar Karmabhoomi Express has an average speed of 55 km/h and covers 1825 km in 33 hrs 20 mins. 12408/Amritsar–New Jalpaiguri Karmabhoomi Express has an average speed of 55 km/h and covers 1825 km in 33 hrs 20 mins.

== Route and halts ==
The important halts of the train are:

- New Jalpaiguri Junction
- Barsoi Junction
- Katihar Junction
- Samastipur Junction
- Muzaffarpur Junction
- Hajipur Junction
- Chhapra Junction
- Siwan Junction
- Deoria Sadar
- Gorakhpur Junction
- Sitapur Junction
- Moradabad
- Saharanpur Junction
- Ambala Cantonment Junction
- Ludhiana Junction
- Jalandhar City Junction
- Beas Junction
- Amritsar Junction

== Coach composition ==
The train has LHB rakes with max speed of 130 kmph. The train consists of 21 coaches:

- 17 General Unreserved Coaches
- 2 EoG cum Sleeper Luggage Rake
- 2 HCPV High Capacity Parcel Van

== Traction ==
Both trains are hauled by a Ghaziabad Loco Shed or Ludhiana Loco Shed-based WAP-7 electric locomotive from New Jalpaiguri to Amritsar and vice versa.

== See also ==
- New Jalpaiguri Junction railway station
- Amritsar Junction railway station
- Chennai–New Jalpaiguri Superfast Express
- New Jalpaiguri–Howrah Shatabdi Express
- New Jalpaiguri-Digha Paharia Express
- Howrah–New Jalpaiguri AC Express
- New Jalpaiguri–New Delhi Superfast Express
- Sealdah-New Jalpaiguri Superfast Darjeeling Mail
- Sealdah-New Jalpaiguri Padatik Superfast Express
- New Jalpaiguri–Sitamarhi Weekly Express
