= New Jalpaiguri–Anand Vihar Terminal Superfast Express =

Train in India

New Jalpaiguri-New Delhi Superfast Express
Overview
- Service type: Superfast
- Locale: West Bengal, Bihar, Uttar Pradesh & Delhi
- First service: 31 March 2010; 15 years ago
- Current operator: Northeast Frontier Railway

Route
- Termini: New Jalpaiguri (NJP); Anand Vihar Terminal (ANVT)
- Stops: 16
- Distance travelled: 1,500 km (932 mi)
- Average journey time: 27 hrs 25 mins
- Service frequency: Bi-Weekly
- Train number: 12523 / 12524

On-board services
- Classes: AC 2 tier, AC 3 tier, Sleeper class, General Unreserved
- Seating arrangements: Yes
- Sleeping arrangements: Yes
- Catering facilities: On-board catering, E-catering
- Observation facilities: Large windows
- Baggage facilities: Available
- Other facilities: Below the seats

Technical
- Rolling stock: LHB coach
- Track gauge: Broad Gauge
- Operating speed: 55 km/h (34 mph) average including halts.

The 12523 / 12524 New Jalpaiguri-New Delhi Superfast Express is a superfast express connecting the Indian cities of New Delhi, the capital of India and Siliguri, the largest metropolis of North Bengal. This train directly originates from New Jalpaiguri Junction and terminates at Anand Vihar Terminal, Delhi. This train connects the Eastern and Northern parts of India, covering the states of West Bengal, Bihar & Uttar Pradesh.

== Accommodations ==
This train comprises 1 AC 2-Tiers, 2 AC 3-Tiers, 12 Sleepar Class, 5 Unreserved General Compartment, 1 Pantry car & 2 Luggage/Parcel cum Brake van which is provided with the Guards' cabin. Total coach composition is 23.

== Timetable ==
- 12523 Anand Vihar Terminal - New Jalpaiguri SF Express (Saturday)

Station Code	Halts	Arrival	Departure
NDLS	Anand Vihar Terminal	--:--	15:10
GZB	Ghaziabad Junction	15:53	15:55
MB	Moradabad Junction	18:15	18:25
LKO	Lucknow Charbagh	23:35	23:45
GD	Gonda Junction	02:00	02:10
GKP	Gorakhpur Junction	04:40	04:55
DEOS	Deoria Sadar	05:38	05:40
SV	Siwan Junction	06:50	06:55
CPR	Chhapra Junction	08:00	08:10
SEE	Sonpur Junction	09:04	09:08
HJP	Hajipur Junction	09:16	09:18
MFP	Muzaffarpur Junction	10:20	10:25
SPJ	Samastipur Junction	11:20	11:25
ROA	Rusera Ghat	11:43	11:45
KGG	Khagaria Junction	12:58	13:00
KIR	Katihar Junction	15:15	15:30
KNE	Kishanganj	17:06	17:08
NJP	New Jalpaiguri	18:35	--:--

- 12523 New Jalpaiguri - Anand Vihar Terminal SF Express (Tuesday, Saturday)

Station Code	Halts	Arrival	Departure
NJP	New Jalpaiguri	--:--	08:15
KNE	Kishanganj	09:21	09:23
KIR	Katihar Junction	11:30	11:45
KGG	Khagaria Junction	13:35	13:40
ROA	Rusera Ghat	14:24	14:25
SPJ	Samastipur Junction	15:10	15:15
MFP	Muzaffarpur Junction	16:07	16:12
HJP	Hajipur Junction	17:17	17:18
SEE	Sonpur Junction	17:35	17:40
CPR	Chhapra Junction	18:40	18:50
SV	Siwan Junction	19:35	19:40
DEOS	Deoria Sadar	20:34	20:35
GKP	Gorakhpur Junction	21:50	22:05
GD	Gonda Junction	00:30	00:35
LKO	Lucknow Charbagh	03:20	03:30
MB	Moradabad Junction	08:55	06:00
GZB	Ghaziabad Junction	11:23	11:25
NDLS	Anand Vihar Terminal	12:10	--:--

== See also ==
- Barauni – Guwahati Line
- New Jalpaiguri Chennai SuperFast Express
- New Jalpaiguri–Howrah Shatabdi Express
- New Jalpaiguri Digha Flag Express
- New Jalpaiguri Howrah AC Express
- New Jalpaiguri Sealdah Darjeeling Mail
- New Jalpaiguri−Amritsar Karmabhoomi Express
- New Jalpaiguri Sitamarhi Express
- New Jalpaiguri-Sealdah Padatik Express
