= MGR Chennai Central – New Jalpaiguri Superfast Express =

Train in India

MGR Chennai Central–New Jalpaiguri Superfast Express
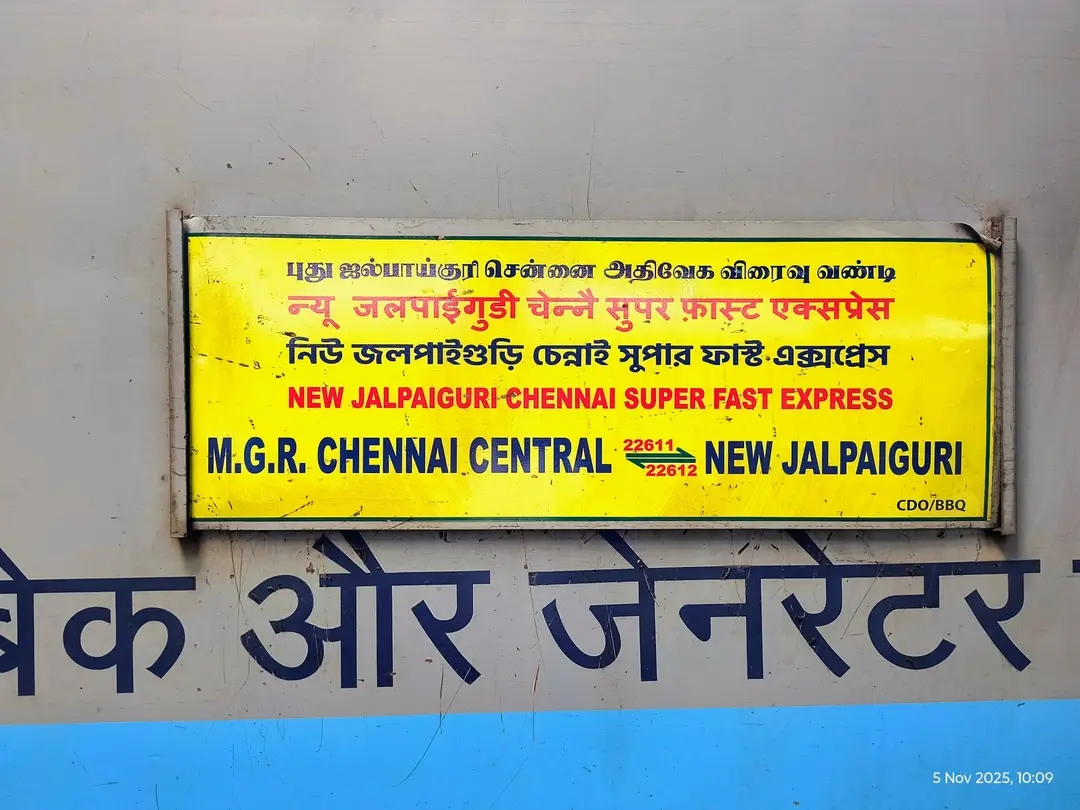

Overview
- Service type: Superfast Express
- Locale: West Bengal, Bihar, Orissa, Andhra Pradesh & Tamil Nadu
- First service: 29 January 2011; 15 years ago
- Current operator: Southern Railway

Route
- Termini: MGR Chennai Central (MAS); New Jalpaiguri (NJP)
- Stops: 21
- Distance travelled: 2,273 km (1,412 mi)
- Average journey time: 40 hrs 45 mins
- Service frequency: Weekly
- Train number: 22611 / 22612

On-board services
- Classes: AC 2 Tier, AC 3 Tier, AC 3 Tier Economy, Sleeper Class, General Unreserved
- Seating arrangements: Yes
- Sleeping arrangements: Yes
- Catering facilities: Available
- Observation facilities: Large windows
- Baggage facilities: Available
- Other facilities: Below the seats

Technical
- Rolling stock: LHB coach
- Track gauge: Broad Gauge
- Operating speed: 55 km/h (34 mph) average including halts.
Route map
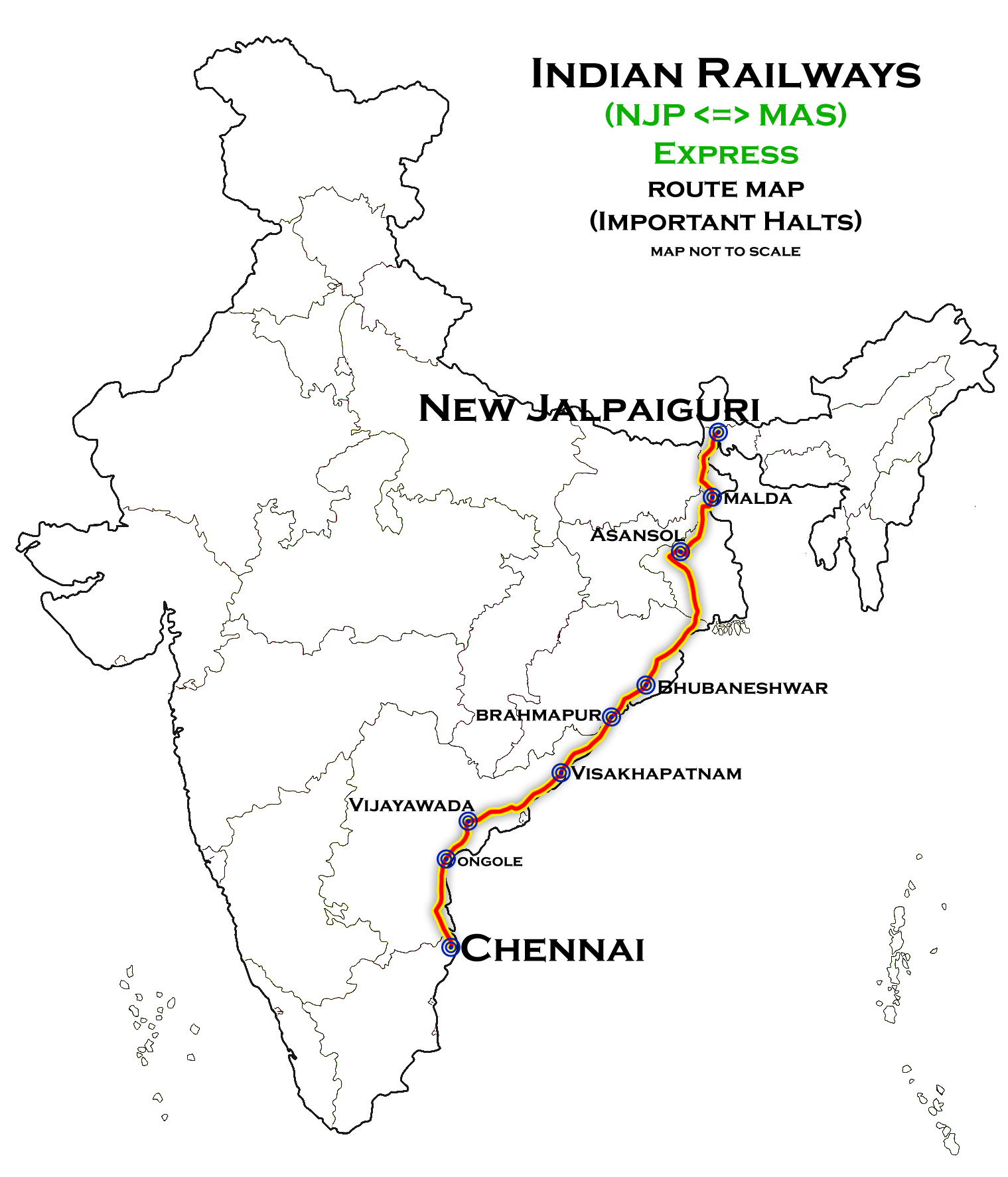

The 22611 / 22612 MGR Chennai Central–New Jalpaiguri SuperFast Express is a superfast express of Southern Railway connecting Indian cities Chennai the capital of Tamil Nadu and Siliguri the largest metropolis of North Bengal. This is the first direct train service originating from MGR Chennai Central and terminating at New Jalpaiguri (Siliguri) via Malda Town, Rampurhat, Siuri, Asansol, Bankura. The train connects Eastern and Southern part of India covering the states of West Bengal, Bihar, Orissa, Andhra Pradesh & Tamil Nadu.It previously ran between MGR Chennai Central and Asansol, and was later extended to run to New Jalpaiguri.

== Accommodations ==
This train comprises 2 AC 2-Tiers, 4 AC 3-Tiers, 4 AC - Economy Class, 13 Sleeper Class, 2 Unreserved General Compartment & 2 Luggage/Parcel.Total coach composition is 23.

== Route ==
22611 / 22612 Puratchi Thalaivar Dr. M.G. Ramachandran Central–New Jalpaiguri Superfast Express
22611 MAS → NJP (Wednesday)					22612 NJP → MAS (Friday)				
Sr.	Station	Day	Arr.	Dep.	Sr.	Station	Day	Arr.	Dep.
1	Dr. M.G. Ramachandran Central railway station	1	—	10:45	1	New Jalpaiguri Junction	1	—	22:05
2	Nellore	1	13:14	13:15	2	Aluabari Road	1	22:45	22:47
3	Ongole	1	14:54	14:55	3	Kishanganj	1	23:10	23:12
4	Vijayawada Junction	1	16:55	17:05	4	Barsoi Junction	2	00:05	00:07
5	Eluru	1	17:49	17:50	5	Harischandrapur	2	00:44	00:46
6	Anakapalle	1	21:43	21:45	6	Malda Town	2	01:50	02:00
7	Duvvada	1	22:33	22:35	7	Rampurhat Junction	2	04:10	04:15
8	Visakhapatnam (Reversal)	1	23:10	23:30	8	Durgapur (Reversal)	2	07:25	07:45
9	Vizianagaram Junction	2	00:18	00:20	9	Asansol Junction	2	08:40	08:50
10	Brahmapur	2	03:08	03:10	10	Adra Junction	2	09:50	09:55
11	Khurda Road Junction	2	05:00	05:10	11	Bankura Junction	2	10:33	10:35
12	Bhubaneswar	2	05:25	05:30	12	Hijli	2	12:40	12:50
13	Hijli	2	10:40	10:50	13	Bhubaneswar	2	17:25	17:30
14	Bankura Junction	2	13:23	13:25	14	Khurda Road Junction	2	18:00	18:15
15	Adra Junction	2	14:25	14:30	15	Brahmapur	2	20:30	20:35
16	Asansol Junction	2	16:15	16:25	16	Vizianagaram Junction	3	00:23	00:25
17	Durgapur (Reversal)	2	17:15	17:35	17	Visakhapatnam (Reversal)	3	01:20	01:40
18	Rampurhat Junction	2	20:05	20:10	18	Duvvada	3	02:18	02:20
19	Malda Town	2	23:00	23:10	19	Anakapalle	3	02:33	02:35
20	Harischandrapur	3	00:03	00:05	20	Eluru	3	05:58	06:00
21	Barsoi Junction	3	00:35	00:37	21	Vijayawada Junction	3	07:00	07:10
22	Kishanganj	3	01:20	01:25	22	Ongole	3	09:08	09:10
23	Aluabari Road	3	01:48	01:50	23	Nellore	3	10:38	10:40
24	New Jalpaiguri Junction	3	03:30	—	24	Dr. M.G. Ramachandran Central railway station	3	14:10	—
Total Distance: 2266 km — Travel Time: 40h 45m					Total Distance: 2267 km — Travel Time: 40h 05m				

== Reversal ==
Chennai-NJP(Siliguri) Superfast Express reverses the direction in the following stations:

1. Visakhapatnam Junction
2. Durgapur

== Major bridges ==
The train passes over some important rivers of India:

1. Creek in Ennore near Chennai
2. Penna river in Nellore
3. Paleru river in Ongole
4. Krishna River in Vijayawada
5. Godavari River in Rajamahendravaram
6. Nagavali River in Srikakulam
7. Vamsadhara River in Srikakulam
8. Rushikulya River in Ganjam
9. Mahanadi river in Cuttack
10. Kathjori river (Mahanadi distributary) in Cuttack
11. Kuakhai River (Mahanadi distributary) near Barang
12. Birupa River (Mahanadi distributary) near Kendrapara
13. Brahmani River in Jenapur
14. Baitarani River in Jajpur Keonjhar Rd.
15. Budhabalanga River in Balasore
16. Subarnarekha River near Jaleswar
17. Kangsabati River near Kharagpur
18. Dwarakeswar River near Bankura
19. Damodar River near Asansol
20. Mayurakshi River near Sainthia
21. Ganges via Farakka Barrage in Farakka
22. Mahananda River near Dumdangi
23. Balason River near Matigara

== See also ==
- Chennai Central railway station
- Tambaram-Silghat Town Nagaon Express
- Bangalore-Guwahati Express
- Thiruvananthapuram–Silchar Superfast Express
- New Tinsukia-Bengaluru Express
- Bangalore-Agartala Humsafar Express
- Dibrugarh–Kanyakumari Vivek Express
- Yesvantpur–Kamakhya AC Superfast Express
- New Jalpaiguri Junction railway station
- New Jalpaiguri–New Delhi Superfast Express
- New Jalpaiguri - Howrah Vande Bharat Express
- New Jalpaiguri - Guwahati Vande Bharat Express
- New Jalpaiguri–Howrah Shatabdi Express
- New Jalpaiguri-Udaipur Superfast Express
