= Howrah–New Jalpaiguri AC Express =

Howrah New Jalpaiguri AC Express
Overview
- Service type: Superfast, AC Express
- First service: 30 July 2013
- Last service: 2020 (along with Howrah-Anand Vihar Yuva Express)
- Current operator: Eastern Railways

Route
- Termini: Howrah Junction; New Jalpaiguri
- Stops: 6
- Distance travelled: 561 km (349 mi)
- Average journey time: 10 hours 15 mins in both directions
- Service frequency: Weekly. 22309 Howrah–New Jalpaiguri AC Express – Tuesday, 22310 New Jalpaiguri–Howrah AC Express – Wednesday.
- Train number: 22309 / 22310

On-board services
- Classes: AC Chair Car, AC 3 tier
- Seating arrangements: Yes
- Sleeping arrangements: Yes
- Catering facilities: No

Technical
- Rolling stock: Standard Indian Railways ICF Yuva Express coaches
- Track gauge: 1,676 mm (5 ft 6 in)
- Operating speed: 110 km/h (68 mph) maximum, 54.73 km/h (34 mph), including halts

The 22309 / 10 Howrah–New Jalpaiguri AC Superfast Express is an AC Superfast Express train belonging to Indian Railways – Eastern Railway zone that runs between Howrah Junction (Kolkata) and New Jalpaiguri (Siliguri).

It operated as train number 22309 from Howrah to New Jalpaiguri and as train number 22310 in the reverse direction, serving the states of West Bengal and Bihar.

== Coaches ==
The 22309 / 10 Howrah–New Jalpaiguri AC Express had 6 AC 3 tier, 11 AC Chair Car and 2 End-on Generator coaches . It did not carry a pantry car .

== Service ==
The 22309 / 10 Howrah–New Jalpaiguri AC Express covered the distance of 561 km (349 mi) in 10 hours 15 mins (54.73 km/h) in both directions.

Despite the average speed of the train being below 55 km/h (34 mph), as per Indian Railways rules, its fare included a Superfast surcharge.

== Routeing ==
The 22309 / 10 Howrah–New Jalpaiguri AC Express runs from Howrah Junction to New Jalpaiguri (Siliguri). The intermediate stations and stoppage time were as follows-

1. Howrah (starts)
2. Barddhaman Junction (2 minutes)
3. Rampurhat Junction (2 minutes)
4. Malda Town (10 minutes)
5. Barsoi Junction (2 minutes)
6. Kishanganj (2 minutes)
7. Aluabari Road Junction (2 minutes)
8. New Jalpaiguri (Siliguri) (ends)

== Traction ==
As the route is fully electrified, this train was powered by Howrah WAP-7 electric locomotives.

== Operation ==
22309 Howrah–New Jalpaiguri AC Express leaves Howrah Junction every Tuesday and reaches New Jalpaiguri the next day.

22310 New Jalpaiguri–Howrah AC Express leaves New Jalpaiguri every Wednesday and reaches Howrah Junction the same day.

== Rake sharing ==
The 22309 / 10 Howrah–New Jalpaiguri AC Express shares its rake with the 12249 / 50 Howrah–Anand Vihar Yuva Express.

== See also ==
- Dedicated Intercity trains of India

== Other trains on the Kolkata–New Jalpaiguri sector ==
- 22301/02 Howrah–New Jalpaiguri Vande Bharat Express
- 12041/42 New Jalpaiguri–Howrah Shatabdi Express
- 12343/44 Sealdah New Jalpaiguri Superfast Darjeeling Mail
- 12377/78 Sealdah New Alipurduar Padatik Superfast Express
- 13149/50 Sealdah Alipurduar Kanchan Kanya Express
- 15959/60 Dibrugarh Howrah Kamrup Express
- 13175/76 Sealdah Silchar/Agartala Kanchanjunga Express
- 12345/46 Guwahati Howrah Saraighat Super-fast Express
- 15722/23 New Jalpaiguri Digha Paharia Express
- 12518/19 Kolkata–Guwahati Garib Rath Express
- 12526/27 Dibrugarh–Kolkata Superfast Express
- 13141/42 Teesta Torsha Express
- 13147/58 Uttar Banga Express
- 12503/04 Bangalore Cantonment–Agartala Humsafar Express
- 13181/82 Kolkata–Silghat Town Kaziranga Express
- 22511/12 Lokmanya Tilak Terminus–Kamakhya Karmabhoomi Express
- 12526/27 Dibrugarh–Kolkata Superfast Express
- 15644/45 Puri–Kamakhya Weekly Express (via Howrah)
- 12364/65 Kolkata–Haldibari Intercity Express
- 12509/10 Guwahati–Bengaluru Cantt. Superfast Express
- 12507/08 Thiruvananthapuram–Silchar Superfast Express
- 12514/15 Guwahati–Secunderabad Express
