= Barsoi–New Farakka section =

Railway section in India

Barsoi–New Farakka section (including Old Malda-Singhabad branch line)
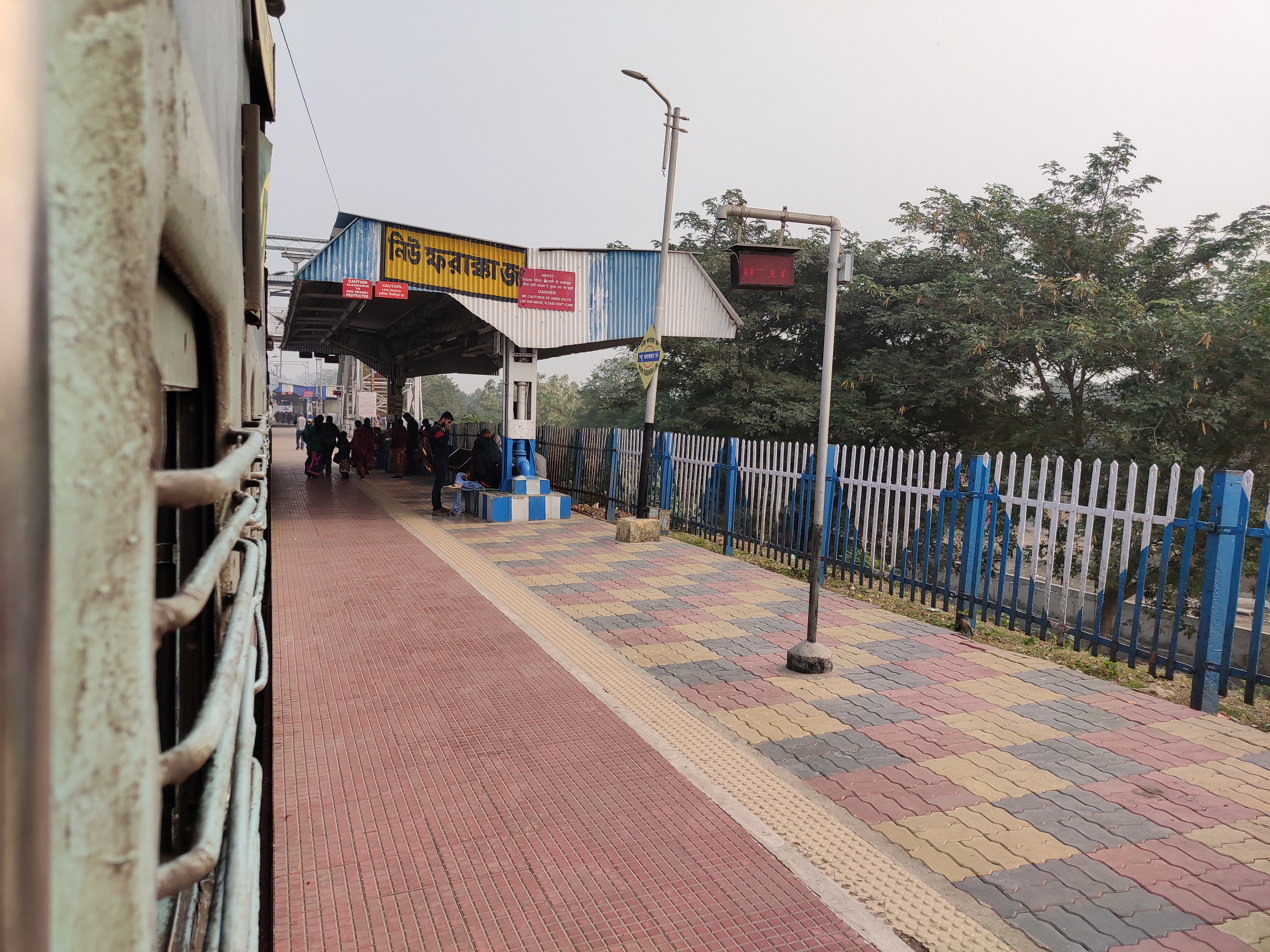
- New Farakka Junction is an important railway station on Barsoi–New Farakka section

Overview
- Status: Operational
- Owner: Indian Railways
- Locale: West Bengal, Jharkhand
- Termini: Barsoi; New Farakka
- Stations: 29

Service
- System: Electrified
- Operator(s): Eastern Railway, Northeast Frontier Railway

History
- Opened: 1963

Technical
- Line length: 126 km (78 mi)
- Number of tracks: 2
- Track gauge: 5 ft 6 in (1,676 mm) broad gauge
- Old gauge: 1,000 mm (3 ft 3 3/8 in) metre gauge
- Operating speed: up to 110 km/h (68 mph)

The Barsoi–New Farakka section is an Indian railway line connecting Barsoi with New Farakka junction on the Howrah–New Jalpaiguri line. This 126-kilometre (78 mi) track is under the jurisdiction of Eastern Railway and Northeast Frontier Railway.

== History ==
With the partition of India in 1947, a major portion of the Calcutta–Siliguri line ran through East Pakistan, now Bangladesh. With several rail links in Bihar, the attention was on those links, and new links were developed. However, one hurdle stood out. There was no bridge across the Ganga river even in Bihar. A generally acceptable route to Siliguri was via Sahibganj loop to Sakrigali ghat. Across the Ganges by ferry to Manihari Ghat. Then metre gauge via Katihar and Barsoi to Kishanganj and finally narrow gauge to Sliguri. In 1949 Kishanganj-Siliguri section was converted to metre gauge.

In the early 1960s, when Farakka Barrage was being constructed, a far reaching change was made. Indian Railways constructed a new broad-gauge rail link from south Bengal. New Jalpaiguri, a new broad-gauge station was built south of Siliguri Town. While a 10 km (6 mi) new line was built from Tildanga station in the B.B loop line to Farakka Ghat on the south bank of Ganges by 1958, a 37 km (23 mi) long 1,676 mm (5 ft 6 in) wide 5 ft 6 in (1,676 mm) broad gauge new line was constructed from Khejuria Ghat (near present-day Chamagram station), on the north bank of the Ganga to Malda Town by 1961. This Kumedpur-Barsoi section was built in 1959. The entire section from Barsoi to Khejuriaghat was completed and connected by 1962. Steamer services connected the north and south banks of the river thereby linking North & South Bengal

The 2,240 m (7,350 ft) long Farakka Barrage, which carries a Rail-cum-Road bridge across the Ganges was opened in 1971 thereby directly linking the Barharwa–Azimganj–Katwa loop to Malda Town, New Jalpaiguri and other railway stations in North Bengal. Consequently, Tildanga-Farakka Ghat & Chamagram-Khejuria Ghat lines were dismantled. The current Rail-cum-Road bridge will be made solely a Railway bridge for New Farakka-Malda Town 3rd Line construction. A new Road bridge on NH 12 is being made at Farakka, which will span 2,401 m (7,877 ft) across the river.

== Branch lines ==
The Old Malda–Abdulpur section is used up to Singhabad on the Indian side. Bangladesh started export of fertilizer to Nepal utilizing the Rohanpur–Singhabad transit point in November 2011.
