= Howrah–New Jalpaiguri Vande Bharat Express =

Vande Bharat Express train route in India

Howrah – New Jalpaiguri Junction Vande Bharat Express

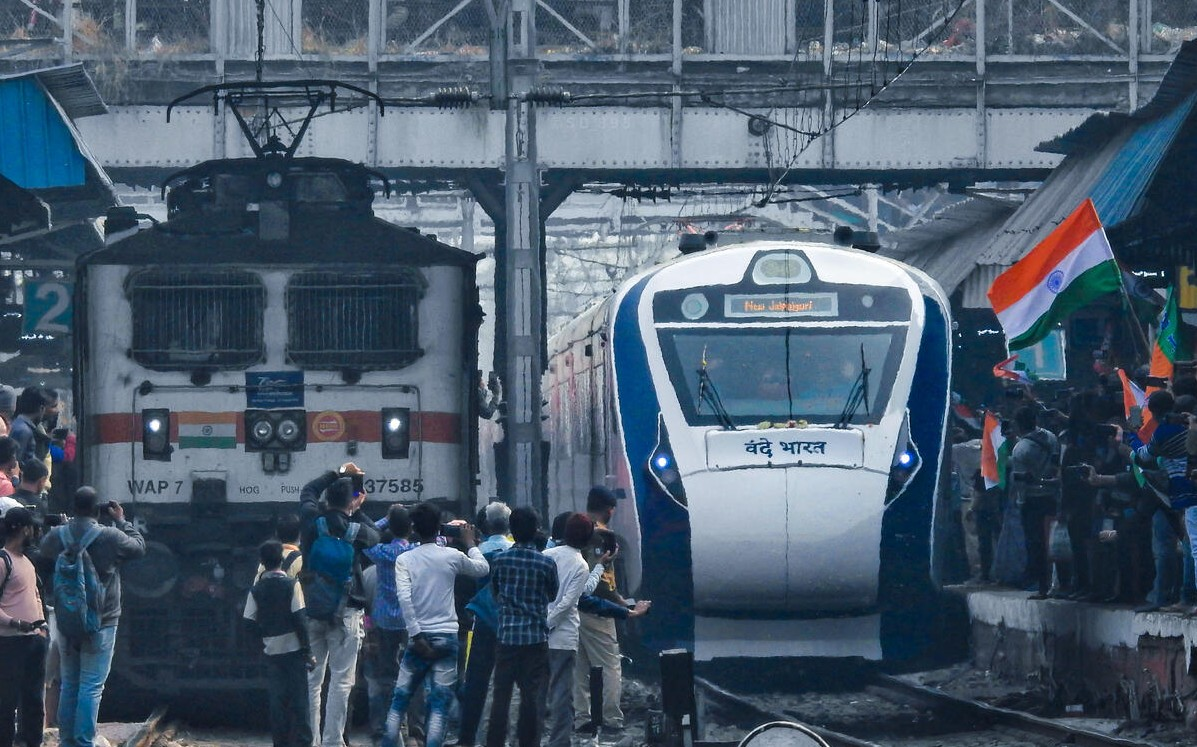
- This Vande Bharat Express train standing with WAP-7 HWH 37585

Overview
- Service type: Vande Bharat Express
- Locale: West Bengal and Bihar
- First service: 30 December 2022 (Inaugural run); 1 January 2023; 3 years ago (Commercial run)
- Current operator: Eastern Railways (ER)

Route
- Termini: Howrah (HWH); New Jalpaiguri Junction (NJP)
- Stops: 4
- Distance travelled: 561 km (349 mi)
- Average journey time: 07 hrs 30 mins
- Service frequency: 6 days a week (Note: Except Wednesdays)
- Train number: 22301 / 22302
- Line used: Howrah–New Jalpaiguri line

On-board services
- Classes: AC Chair Car, AC Executive Chair Car
- Seating arrangements: Airline style; Rotatable seats
- Sleeping arrangements: No
- Auto-rack arrangements: No
- Catering facilities: On-board catering
- Observation facilities: Large windows
- Entertainment facilities: On-board WiFi; Infotainment System; Electric outlets; Reading light; Seat Pockets; Bottle Holder; Tray Table
- Baggage facilities: Overhead racks
- Other facilities: Kavach

Technical
- Rolling stock: Vande Bharat 2.0
- Track gauge: Indian gauge 1,676 mm (5 ft 6 in) broad gauge
- Electrification: 25 kV 50 Hz AC Overhead line
- Operating speed: 75 km/h (47 mph) (Average)
- Average length: 384 metres (1,260 ft)
- Track owner: Indian Railways
- Rake maintenance: Liluah Sorting Yard, Howrah; Vande Bharat Maintenance Depot, Howrah

The Howrah–New Jalpaiguri Vande Bharat Express is an Indian Railways Vande Bharat Express train. It connects the capital of West Bengal, Kolkata, via Howrah railway station to the largest city in northern West Bengal, Silguri, via New Jalpaiguri Junction railway station. During the journey the train stops at Bolpur Shantiniketan, Malda Town, Barsoi Junction and Kishanganj.

== Overview ==
This train is being operated by Indian Railways, connecting Kolkata and Siliguri, West Bengal's two most important cities. The train service officially started from 1 January 2023 on New Year's Day from Howrah. However the inaugural service ran on 30 December from Howrah. This is the first Vande Bharat train service in Eastern India.

== Service ==
The 22301/22302 Howrah Jn - New Jalpaiguri Jn Vande Bharat Express operates six days a week except Wednesdays, covering a distance of 566 km (352 mi) in a travel time of 7 hours with an average speed of 75 km/h (47 mph). The service has 4 intermediate stops. The Maximum Permissible Speed is 130 km/h (81 mph).

== Schedule ==
The schedule of this 22301/22302 Howrah–New Jalpaiguri Vande Bharat Express is given below:-

HWH - NJP - HWH Vande Bharat Express
22301 (Except Wednesday)		Stations	22302 (Except Wednesday)	
Arrival	Departure	Stations	Arrival	Departure
-NIL-	05:55	Howrah Junction	22:30	-NIL-
07:25	07:27	Bolpur Shantiniketan	20:03	20:05
10:22	10:25	Malda Town	17:45	17:48
11:28	11:30	Barsoi Junction	16:28	16:30
12:15	12:17	Kishanganj Junction	15:46	15:48
13:30	-NIL-	New Jalpaiguri Junction	-NIL-	14:55

== Gallery ==
Some of the pictures taken are given below:-

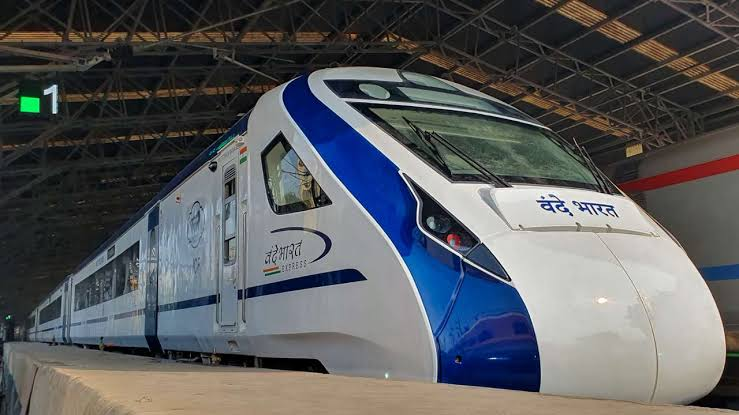
New Vande Bharat Express train standing at Car shed in Howrah for maintenance

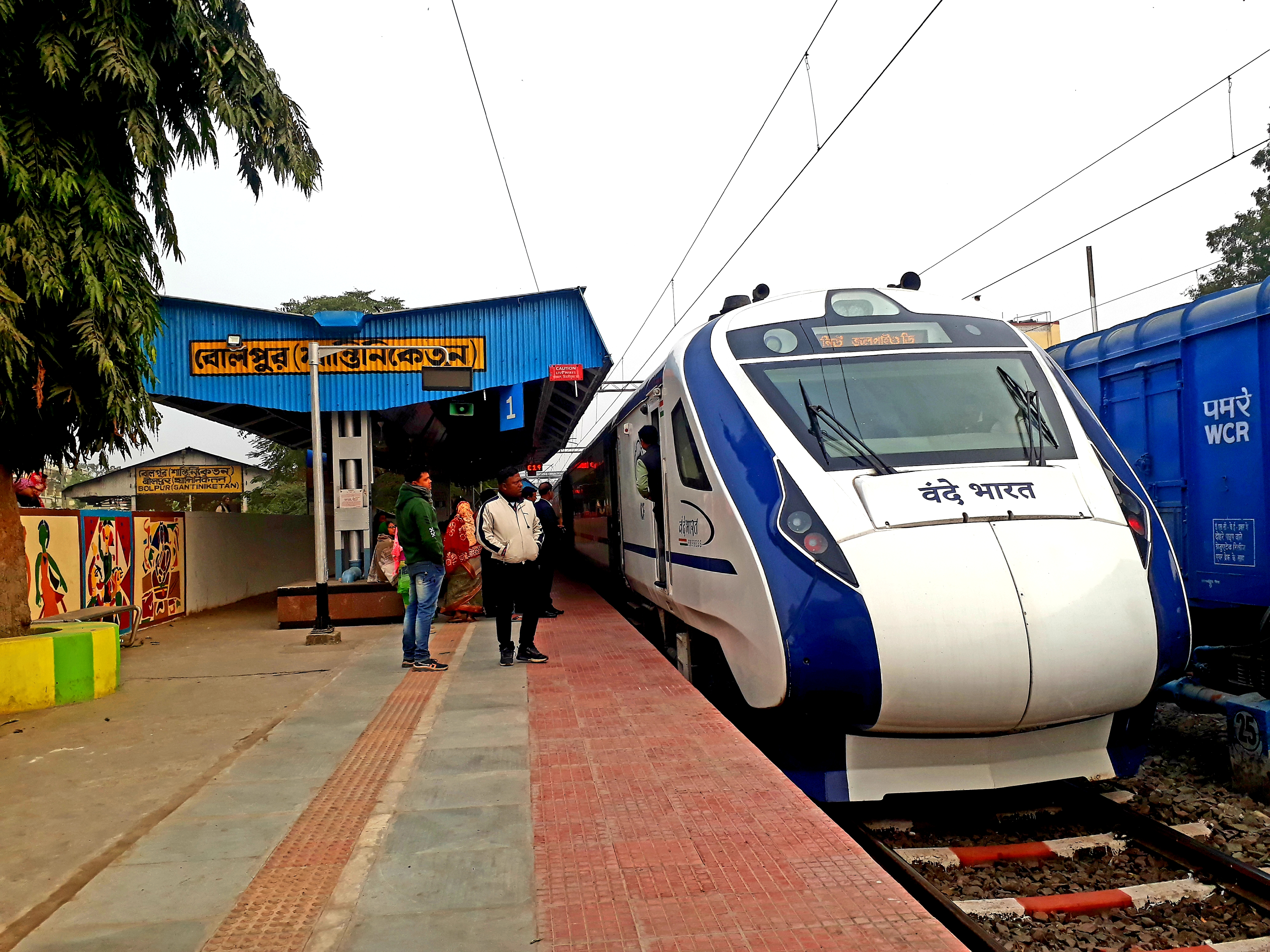
Vande Bharat Express arriving at Bolpur Shantiniketan and heading towards New Jalpaiguri Jn

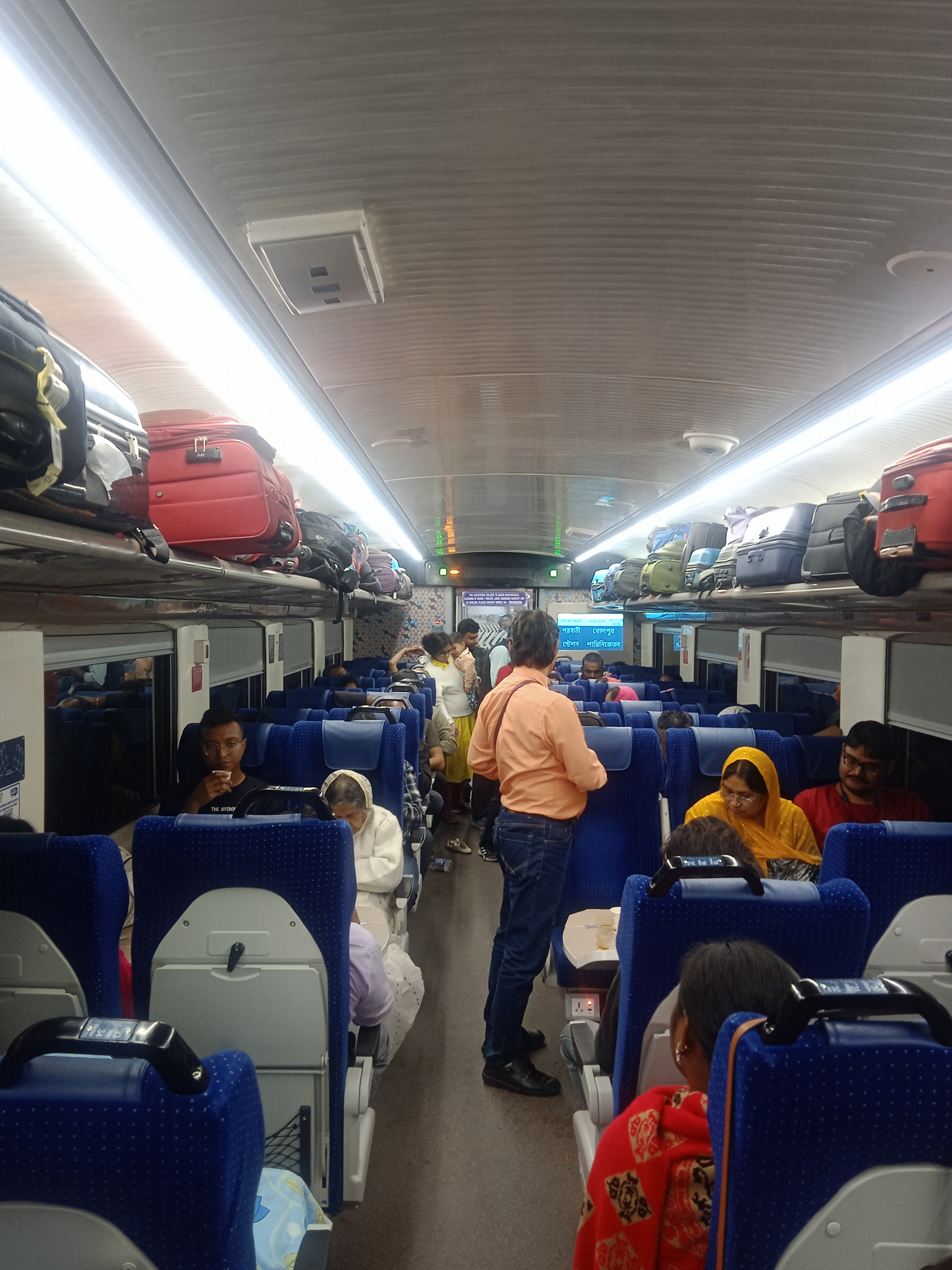
Interior of AC chair car of HWH-NJP Vande Bharat express

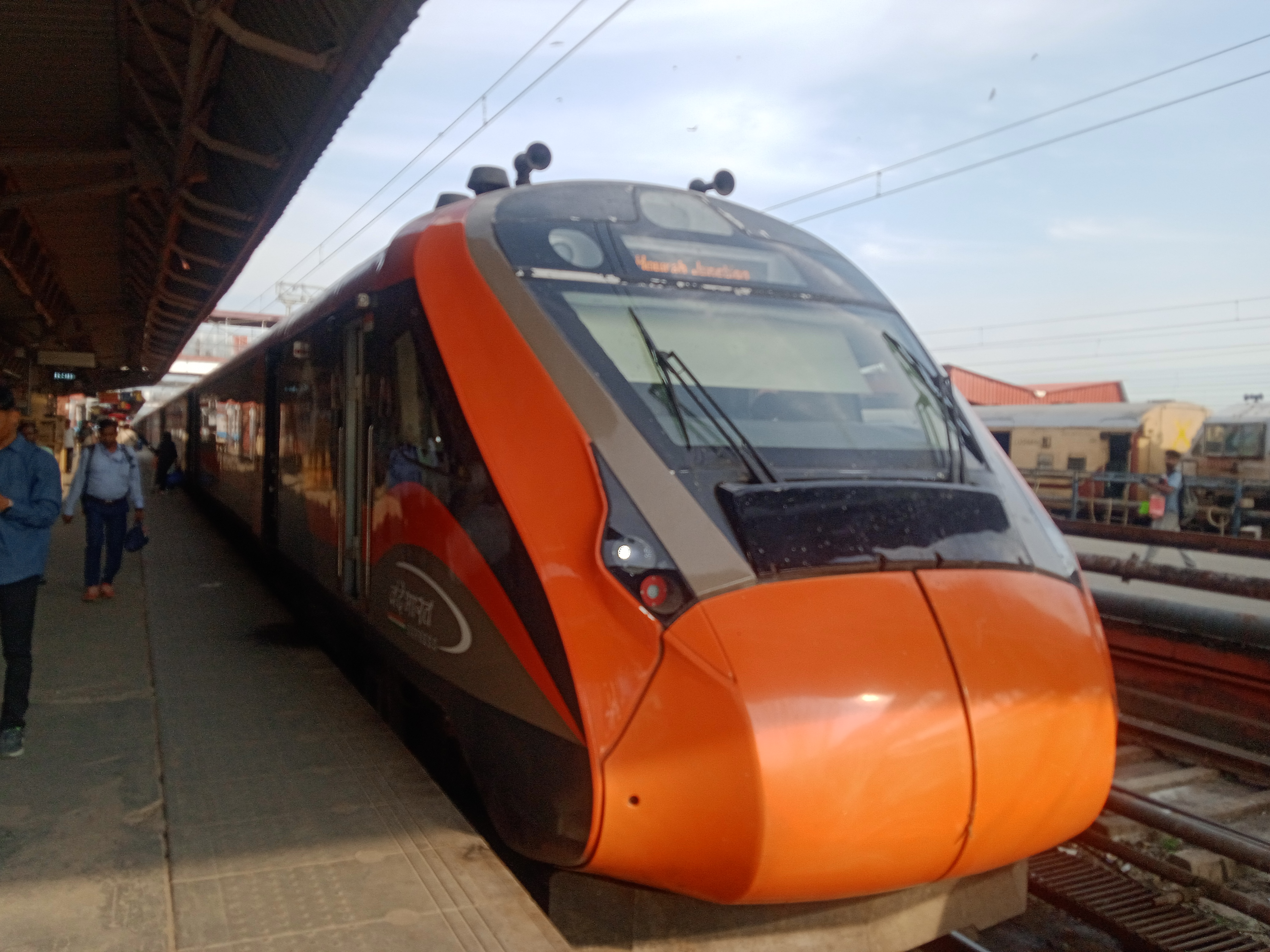
NJP-HWH Vande Bharat Express at New Jalpaiguri Junction railway station. It's also worth mentioning that the train has been re-painted from its old white and blue livery to the new saffron and black livery.

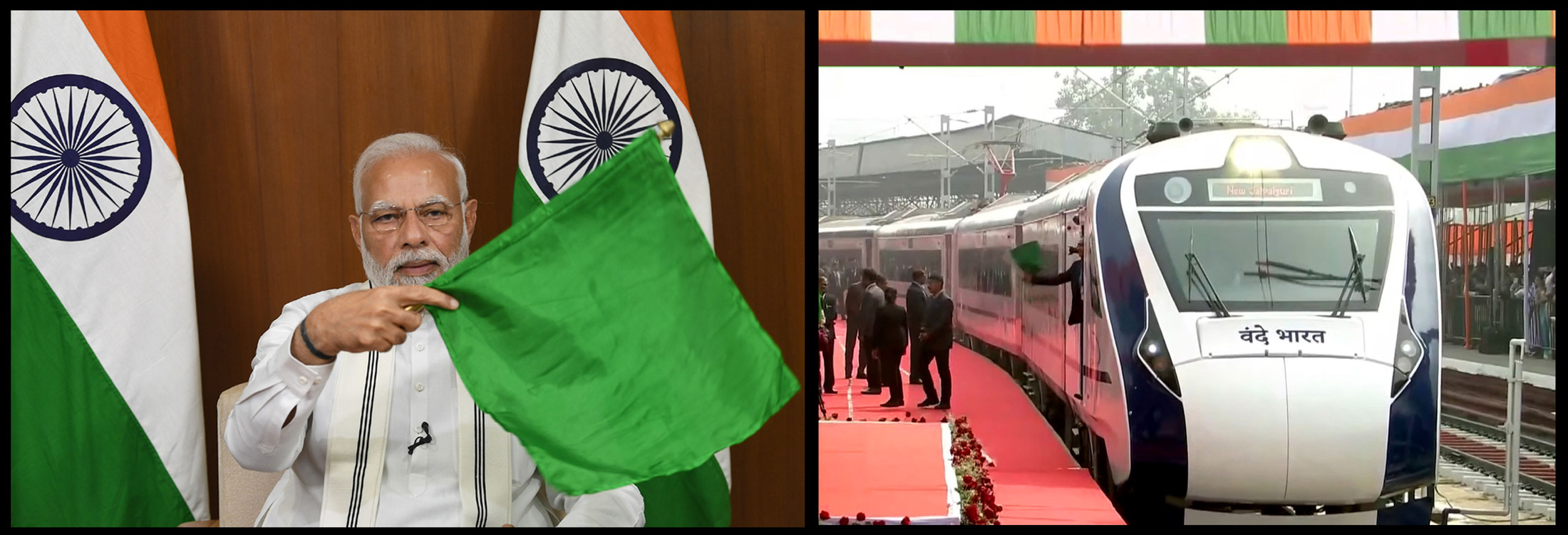
PM Narendra Modi flagging off Vande Bharat Express connecting Howrah to New Jalpaiguri via video conferencing on 30 December 2022

== Incidents ==
Three days after the inauguration of Vande Bharat express bound towards Howrah Jn in Howrah-New Jalpaiguri route at 2 January 2023 at around 17:30, some unidentified persons pelted stones allegedly at Kumarganj in Malda near Bihar. No casualties were reported. After the brief inspection by police in Howrah, it was reported that the door glass of C13 coach was shattered.

== See also ==
- Vande Bharat Express
- Tejas Express
- Gatimaan Express
- New Jalpaiguri–Howrah Shatabdi Express
- Howrah–New Jalpaiguri line
- Howrah railway station
- New Jalpaiguri Junction railway station
