= Howrah–New Jalpaiguri line =

Railway route in West Bengal, India

Howrah–New Jalpaiguri main line
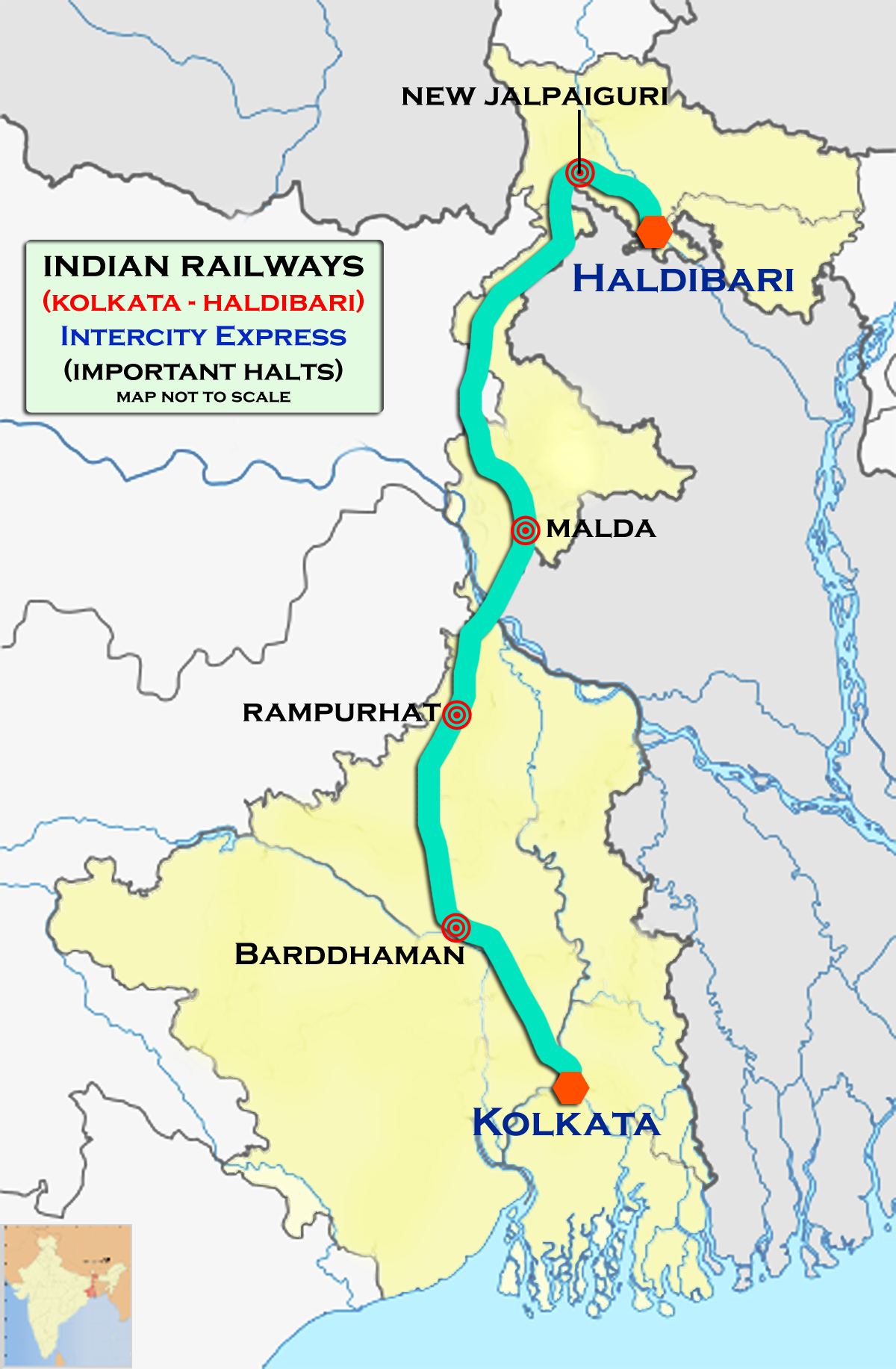
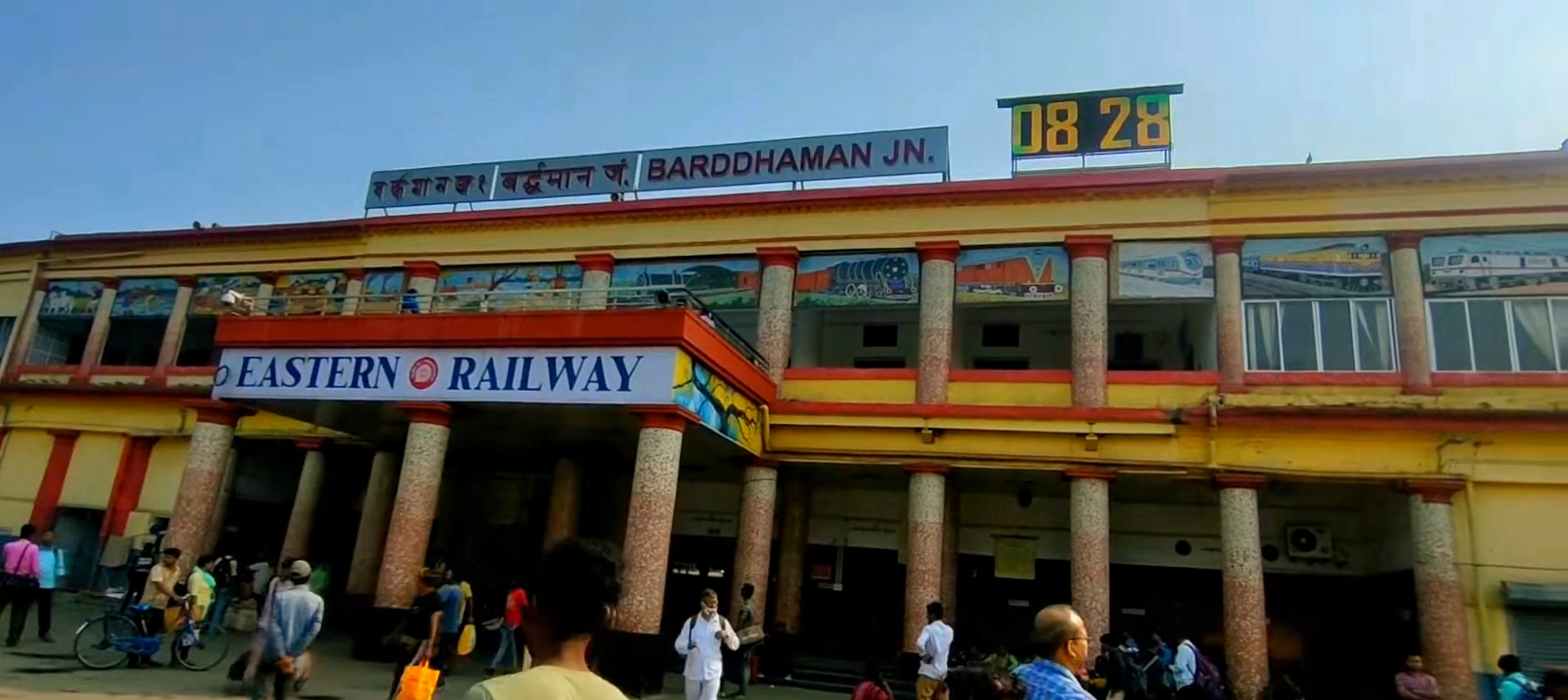
- Route map of Howrah–New Jalpaiguri main line and Barddhaman Junction railway station is an important railway station on Howrah–New Jalpaiguri main line

Overview
- Status: Operational
- Owner: Indian Railways
- Locale: West Bengal
- Termini: •Howrah railway station (south); •New Jalpaiguri Junction railway station (north)
- Stations: 120 (excluding termini)

Service
- System: Indian Railways
- Operator: 1. Eastern Railway; 2. Northeast Frontier Railway

History
- Opened: 1971; 55 years ago

Technical
- Line length: Howrah – NJP Jn: 564 km (350 mi); Sealdah – NJP Jn: 573 km (356 mi)
- Number of tracks: 1. Howrah–Chandanpur(0-38km): 4 tracks 2. Chandanpur–Saktigarh(38–81km): 3 tracks 3. Saktigarh–Khana (81–106km): 4 tracks 4. Khana–Sainthia Junction (106–177km): 2 tracks 5. Sainthia Junction–Murarai (177–236km): 3 tracks 6. Murarai–NJP Jn (236–564km): 2 tracks
- Track gauge: 5 ft 6 in (1,676 mm) broad gauge
- Electrification: Fully electrified (Operational from 9 January 2020)
- Operating speed: 130kmph (max)

The Howrah–New Jalpaiguri line is a railway line connecting Howrah railway station to New Jalpaiguri Junction railway station in the Indian state of West Bengal. The line continues through North Bengal and western part of Assam to connect with Guwahati. The Howrah–New Jalpaiguri Junction line is divided into two routes: one is the Barddhaman Junction–Rampurhat Junction–New Farakka Junction or Khana–Rampurhat Junction–Gumani section (Part of Sahibganj loop), which is considered as Howrah–NJP main line.The other is the Bandel Junction- Katwa Junction–New Farakka section (Part of BAK loop), which is considered as Howrah–NJP loop line. The Naihati–Bandel link allows trains from another terminus Sealdah in Kolkata to use this route. Other parts of West Bengal and Bihar are well-connected to this line. It is under the administrative jurisdiction of Eastern Railway and Northeast Frontier Railway.

== Main stations ==
HWH–NJP main line
Station code	Station name	Distance (km)
HWH	Howrah	00
BWN	Bardhaman	93
BHP	Bolpur Santiniketan	145
RPH	Rampurhat Junction	205
NFK	New Farakka Junction	294
MLDT	Malda Town	329
KNE	Kishanganj	477
NJP	New Jalpaiguri Junction	564

HWH–NJP loop line
Station code	Station name	Distance (km)
HWH	Howrah	00
BDC	Bandel Junction	38
KWAE	Katwa Junction	143
AZ	Azimganj Junction	216
NFK	New Farakka Junction	295
MLDT	Malda Town	330
KNE	Kishanganj	478
NJP	New Jalpaiguri	565

Note: Bold letters indicates major railway stations/major cities.

== Route details ==
Subject	Main line (SBG loop)	Loop line (BAK loop)
Route	Howrah → Bardhaman → Khana → Rampurhat → Gumani → New Farakka → Malda → NJP	Howrah → Bandel → Katwa → Azimganj → Jangipur → New Farakka → Malda → NJP
Major station	Bardhaman, Bolpur, Rampurhat Junction	Bandel Junction, Katwa Junction, Azimganj Junction
Distance	564 km (350 mi)	565 km (351 mi)
Travel Time (Fastest)	7 hr 30 min (NJP VB)	9 hr 40 min (Garib Rath)
Max speed	130 kmph	110 kmph
Number of tracks	1. Howrah–Chandanpur(0–38 km): 4 tracks 2. Chandanpur–Saktigarh(38–81 km): 3 tracks 3. Saktigarh–Khana (81–106 km): 4 tracks 4. Khana–Sainthia Junction (106–177 km): 2 tracks 5. Sainthia Junction–Murarai (177–236 km): 3 tracks 6. Murarai–NJP Jn (236–564 km): 2 tracks	1. Howrah–Bandel Junction (0–38 km): 3 tracks 2. Bandel Junction–NJP Jn (39–565 km): 2 tracks
Operational role	Acts as main trunk line Kolkata–North Bengal.	Acts as bypass/alternate line when Sahibganj loop congested or disrupted.
Tourist destinations	Rampurhat (Tarapith) Bolpur (Santiniketan)	Nabadwip Dham (Birthplace of Chaitanya Mahaprabhu, Mayapur ISKCON temple) Khagraghat (Hazarduari Palace)
Prestigious trains	Almost all premium trains like Vande bharat(22301/02),Shatabdi (12041/42), Humsafar (12503/04), Amrit bharat (13433/34), Darjeeling Mail (12343/44), Padatik (12377/78),Saraighat (12345/46) etc.	Mainly passenger & ordinary express trains; very few prestigious trains like Garib rath (12501/02,12517/18), Vande Bharat Sleeper Express (27575/27576) etc.
Number of trains	10 (excluding Howrah Bypass) 18 (including Howrah Bypass-Via Dankuni)	6
Branch routes	1. Dankuni–Andul; 2. Bardhaman–Katwa; 3. Khana–Asansol; 4. Ahmadpur–Katwa; 5. Sainthia–Andal; 6. Rampurhat–Dumka; 7. Nalhati–Azimganj; 8. Bonidanga–Sahibganj	1. Bardhaman–Katwa; 2. Ahmadpur–Katwa; 3. Nalhati–Azimganj; 4. Azimganj–Cossimbazar
Historical importance	Oldest & primary alignment of Howrah–Delhi main line (before Kiul–Patna line got prominence).	Originally built as a branch/loop for Katwa–Azimganj–Farakka region connectivity.
Geography	Runs through Burdwan, Birbhum & Jharkhand border areas (Rampurhat, Pakur, etc.).	Runs through Nadia & Murshidabad districts (Katwa, Azimganj, Jiaganj).
Bridges	Crosses Ajay River, Mayurakshi River, Gumani River and Farakka Barrage.	Crosses Bhagirathi Canal (Ahiran Bridge) and also Farakka Barrage.
Others	Fastest; Least distance; More tracks; More number of premium trains; More branch routes; More freight congestion (trunk route); More popular tourist destination	Less freight pressure; Less train congestion; Less traffic; More historic places

== Sections ==
The 561 km (349 mi)-long trunk line, been treated in more detail in smaller sections:

For HWH–NJP main line :

- Howrah–Barddhaman main line
- Howrah–Barddhaman chord line
- Barddhaman–Rampurhat section
- Rampurhat–Malda Town section

For HWH–NJP loop line :

- Howrah–Bandel–Katwa section
- Barharwa–Azimganj–Katwa loop

For Common Line (New Farakka–Malda Town–NJP):

- Barsoi–New Farakka section
- Katihar–New Jalpaiguri, Thakurganj and Siliguri sections

== Earlier development ==
During the British period all connections to North Bengal were through the eastern part of Bengal. From 1878, the railway route from Calcutta (now spelt Kolkata) to Siliguri was in two laps. The first lap was a 185 km journey along the Eastern Bengal State Railway from Calcutta Station (later renamed Sealdah) to Damookdeah Ghat on the southern bank of the Padma River, then across the river in a ferry and the second lap of the journey. A 336 km metre-gauge line of the North Bengal Railway linked Saraghat on the northern bank of the Padma to Siliguri.

The 1.849 kilometres (1.149 mi) long Hardinge Bridge across the Padma came up in 1912. Presently, it is between the Paksey and Bheramara stations on the broad-gauge line between Darshana and Parbatipur in Bangladesh. In 1926 the metre-gauge section north of the bridge was converted to broad gauge, and so the entire 529 kilometres (329 mi) long Calcutta–Siliguri route became broad gauge. The route till 1947 thus ran:
0 Sealdah
23 kilometres (14 mi) Barrackpore
38 kilometres (24 mi) Naihati
74 kilometres (46 mi) Ranaghat
169 kilometres (105 mi) Bheramara–Hardinge Bridge
225 kilometres (140 mi) Iswardi
287 kilometres (178 mi) Santahar
342 kilometres (213 mi) Hili
386 kilometres (240 mi) Parabtipur
430 kilometres (270 mi) Nilphamari
464.4 kilometres (288.6 mi) Haldibari
489 kilometres (304 mi) Jalpaiguri
529 kilometres (329 mi) Siliguri.

== Post-partition development ==
With the partition of India in 1947, a major portion of the Calcutta–Siliguri line ran through East Pakistan, now Bangladesh. With several rail links in Bihar, the attention was on those links, and new links were developed. However, one hurdle stood out. There was no bridge across the Ganga river even in Bihar. A generally acceptable route to Siliguri was via Sahibganj loop to Sakrigali ghat. Across the Ganges by ferry to Manihari Ghat. Then metre gauge via Katihar and Barsoi to Kishanganj and finally narrow gauge to Sliguri. In 1949 Kishanganj–Siliguri section was converted to metre gauge.

In the early 1960s, when Farakka Barrage was being constructed, a far reaching change was made. Indian Railways constructed a new broad-gauge rail link from south Bengal. New Jalpaiguri, a new broad-gauge station was built south of Siliguri Town. The 37 km (23 mi)-long 1,676 mm (5 ft 6 in) wide 5 ft 6 in (1,676 mm) broad-gauge line was constructed from Khejuriaghat, on the north bank of the Ganga to Malda between 1959 and 1963.

The 2,240 m (7,350 ft) long Farakka Barrage carries a rail-cum-road bridge across the Ganga. The rail bridge was opened in 1971 thereby linking the Barharwa–Azimganj–Katwa loop to Malda Town, New Jalpaiguri and other railway stations in North Bengal.

== Reorganisation in the Siliguri area ==
The Darjeeling Himalayan Railway came up as a narrow-gauge (2 feet) railway in 1881. In 1915, it was extended up the Teesta Valley to Gielle Kola and to the south to Kishanganj. In 1949 Kishanganj – Siliguri was converted from narrow-gauge to metre-gauge and extended north-east into Assam, partly along the narrow-gauge Teesta Valley route. Along with development of the metre-gauge line, a new Siliguri Junction station, north of the traditional Siliguri Town station, became the main station in the area. With the development of the broad-gauge system and the New Jalpaiguri station, the narrow gauge DHR was extended to New Jalpaiguri.

The earlier Siliguri–Kishanganj metre-gauge line is now part of the Siliguri–Kishanganj–Katihar metre-gauge line. Part of the metre-gauge track runs parallel to the broad-gauge track and part of it has a separate route.

The Siliguri–Haldibari route, part of the original broad-gauge Calcutta–Siliguri track via Hardinge Bridge, got delinked from the trunk route because of partition in 1947. As all the other tracks in the area were metre gauge, it was converted from broad gauge to metre gauge in the late 1940s. When New Jalpaiguri station came up, the line was extended to New Jalpaiguri. When broad-gauge lines were laid in the area, it was reconverted to broad gauge and now functions as the Haldibari–New Jalpaiguri line.

== Assam link ==
The railway system in Assam got delinked from the rest of India in 1947. In order to establish a link with Assam, the Assam Rail Link Project, connecting Kishanganj with Fakirgram was started on a war footing on 26 January 1948. A 229 km-long metre-gauge line was built and commissioned in two years. The Kishanganj branch of the Darjeeling Himalayan Railway was taken over and converted to metre gauge. It was connected to the North Eastern Railway network at Barsoi. The Teesta Valley Line up to Sivok was taken over and converted to metre gauge. The link spanned three major rivers – Teesta, Torsha, and Sankosh. The Kishanganj–Naxalbari section was completed on 31 July 1948, the Naxalbari–New Bagrakot section on 26 January 1950, the Madarihat–Hashimara section on 25 December 1949 and Alipurduar–Fakirgram section on 26 January 1950.

In the seventies a new broad-gauge line was laid between New Jalpaiguri and Guwahati. The entire Barauni–Katihar–Guwahati line is being electrified.

== Branch lines ==
The Katihar–Barsoi–Raiganj–Radhikapur–Dinajpur–Parabatipur line is now operated on the Indian side up to Radhikapur only. The transit facility in the Radhikapur–Birol sector is virtually closed. The railway track on the Indian side has been converted to broad gauge while that on the Bangladesh side remains metre gauge.

The Old Maldah–Rajshahi section is used up to Singhabad on the Indian side. Bangladesh started export of fertilizer to Nepal utilizing the Rahanpur–Singhabad transit point in November 2011.

The 87.26 kilometres (54.22 mi)-long Eklakhi–Balurghat broad-gauge line was opened in 2004. Extension of the Eklakhi–Balurghat branch line to Hili was announced in the Rail Budget for 2010–11.

See also Barharwa–Azimganj–Katwa loop for other branch lines along this route.

== Railway electrification ==
Fully electrified. Passenger service with electric locomotives initiated on 09.01.2020.

== Trains ==
Some of the important trains running through main line are as follows:

- Howrah–New Jalpaiguri Vande Bharat Express
- Howrah–New Jalpaiguri Shatabdi Express
- Howrah–New Jalpaiguri AC Express
- Darjeeling Mail
- Padatik Express
- Kanchan Kanya Express
- Uttar Banga Express
- Sealdah–Silchar Kanchanjungha Express
- Saraighat Express
- Kolkata–Haldibari Intercity Express
- Kolkata–Silghat Town Kaziranga Express

Some of the important trains running through loop line are as follows:

- Teesta Torsha Express
- Hate Bazare Express (via Mansi)
- Kamrup Express
- Paharia Express
- Dibrugarh–Kolkata Superfast Express
- Kolkata–Guwahati Garib Rath Express
