= Kumarganj railway station =

Railway station in West Bengal, India

General information
- Location: Barail, Kumarganj, West Bengal; India
- Coordinates: 25°13′6″N 88°3′56″E
- Elevation: 28 m (92 ft)
- System: Indian Railways
- Line: Howrah–New Jalpaiguri line
- Platforms: 2

Construction
- Structure type: Standard (on ground)
- Parking: Available

Other information
- Station code: KMRJ
- Zone(s): Northeast Frontier Railway
- Division(s): Katihar
Location
- Location within West Bengal Location within India

Kumarganj railway station is a station on the Howrah–New Jalpaiguri line in West Bengal, India. The name Kumarganj is linked with কুমার (potter) and গঞ্জ (market). It is situated in Northeast Frontier zone (NFR) in Katihar railway division of India.
