= Kamakhya–SMVT Bengaluru AC Superfast Express =

Kamakhya Junction – SMVT Bengaluru AC Superfast Express

Overview
- Service type: Superfast Express, AC Express
- Status: Operating
- Locale: Assam, West Bengal, Bihar, Odisha, Andhra Pradesh, Tamil Nadu, Karnataka
- First service: 8 February 2014
- Current operator: Northeast Frontier Railway zone

Route
- Termini: Kamakhya Junction (KYQ); Sir M. Visvesvaraya Terminal, Bengaluru (SMVB)
- Distance travelled: 3,025 km (1,880 mi)
- Average journey time: 53 hours
- Service frequency: Weekly
- Train number: 12552/12251

On-board services
- Classes: AC 1st Class, AC 2 tier, AC 3 tier
- Seating arrangements: No
- Sleeping arrangements: Yes
- Auto-rack arrangements: No
- Catering facilities: Pantry car attached; E-Catering available
- Observation facilities: LHB coach
- Baggage facilities: Below the seats

Technical
- Rolling stock: Standard Indian Railways LHB coach
- Track gauge: 1,676 mm (5 ft 6 in)
- Electrification: Yes
- Operating speed: 130 km/h (80 mph) maximum 57.13 km/h (35.50 mph) including halts

The 12552/12551 Kamakhya–SMVT Bengaluru AC Superfast Express is a Superfast Express train operated by Northeast Frontier Railway of Indian Railways connecting Bengaluru (the capital of state of Karnataka) with Guwahati (the capital of state of Assam). The service runs between Kamakhya Junction and Sir M. Visvesvaraya Terminal with intermediate stops at New Jalpaiguri, Malda Town, Rampurhat, Siuri and Durgapur stations.

It operates as train number 12552 from Kamakhya to Sir M. Visvesvaraya Terminal and as train number 12551 in the reverse direction, serving the seven states of Andhra Pradesh, Assam, Bihar, Karnataka, Odisha, Tamil Nadu and West Bengal.

== Coaches ==
The 12552/12551 Kamakhya Junction–SMVT Bangalore AC Express has 1 AC 1st Class, 4 AC 2 tier, 11 AC 3 tier & 2 End-on Generator Coaches. In addition, it carries a pantry car.

As is customary with most train services in India, coach composition may be amended at the discretion of Indian Railways depending on demand.

== Service ==
The 12552 Kamakhya Junction–SMVT Bangalore AC Express covers the distance of 3,025 km (1,880 mi) in 52 hours 25 mins averaging 57.71 km/h (35.86 mph) and in 53 hours 30 mins as 12551 SMVT Bangalore–Kamakhya Junction AC Express averaging 56.54 km/h (35.13 mph).

As the average speed of the train is above 55 km/h (35 mph), as per Indian Railways rules, its fare includes a Superfast surcharge.

== Routing ==
State	Station
Assam	**Kamakhya Junction**
Assam	Rangiya Junction
Assam	New Bongaigaon
West Bengal	New Alipurduar
West Bengal	New Cooch Behar Junction
West Bengal	**New Jalpaiguri Junction** (Siliguri)
West Bengal	Malda Town
West Bengal	**Rampurhat Junction**
West Bengal	Siuri
West Bengal	Durgapur
West Bengal	**Asansol Junction**
West Bengal	Adra Junction
West Bengal	**Bankura Junction**
West Bengal	Midnapore
**Hijli** (Kharagpur)
Bihar	Kishanganj
Bihar	Barsoi Junction
Odisha	Balasore
Odisha	Cuttack Junction
Odisha	**Bhubaneswar**
Odisha	Khurda Road Junction
Odisha	Brahmapur
Andhra Pradesh	Vizianagaram Junction
Andhra Pradesh	Samalkot Junction
Andhra Pradesh	**Vijayawada Junction**
Andhra Pradesh	Gudur Junction
Tamil Nadu	**Chennai Central**
Tamil Nadu	Katpadi Junction
Tamil Nadu	Jolarpettai
Karnataka	**Sir M. Visvesvaraya Terminal**

Note: Bold type indicates major stations and cities.

=== Reversal ===
The train reverses direction of travel twice during its run at Durgapur and MGR Chennai Central.

== Traction ==
As the entire route is fully electrified. A Howrah base WAP-4 hauls the train from Kamakhya Junction up to Durgapur handing over to a Howrah-based WAP-5 until Chennai Central after which a Lallaguda or Vijayawada-based WAP-5 and WAP-7 locomotive powers the train all the way up to Sir M. Visvesvaraya Terminal.

== Operation ==
- 12552 Kamakhya Junction–Sir M. Visvesvaraya Terminal AC Express runs from Kamakhya Junction every Wednesday reaching SMVT Bangalore on the third day i.e. Friday.
- 12551 Sir M. Visvesvaraya Terminal Junction–Kamakhya Junction AC Express runs from SMVT Bangalore every Saturday reaching Kamakhya Junction on the third day i.e. Monday.

== Accidents ==
On 8 October 2022, A 31-year-old lady travelling with her 3-year-old child and elderly mother slipped and fell between platform no. 1 and the adjoining tracks while hurriedly boarding a moving 12551 SMVT Bengaluru–Kamakhya AC Superfast Express with a manually operated door at SMVT Bengaluru. The lady was initially saved by an officer of the Government Railway Police, who pulled her out onto the platform. She had a fractured arm but unfortunately died while en route to the Bowring & Lady Curzon Hospitals in Shivajinagara, Bengaluru.

On 30 March 2025, 11 coaches of the train was derailed near Nergundi Junction railway station in Cuttack district at 11:45 am, one person have been killed in this accident with 25 persons hospitalized. this is the second train of SMVT bengaluru being involved in a train accident in odisha, last time was on 2 June when Howrah–SMVT Bengaluru Superfast Express collided with Coromandel Express near Bahanaga Bazar railway station which is now known as the 2023 Odisha train collision.

== See also ==
- Chennai–New Jalpaiguri Superfast Express
- Nagaon Express
- Guwahati–Bengaluru Cantt. Superfast Express
- Thiruvananthapuram–Silchar Superfast Express
- New Tinsukia–Bengaluru Weekly Express
- Bangalore Cantonment–Agartala Humsafar Express
- Dibrugarh–Kanyakumari Vivek Express
