= Kishanganj railway station =

Railway station in Kishanganj, Bihar, India

KISHANGANJ

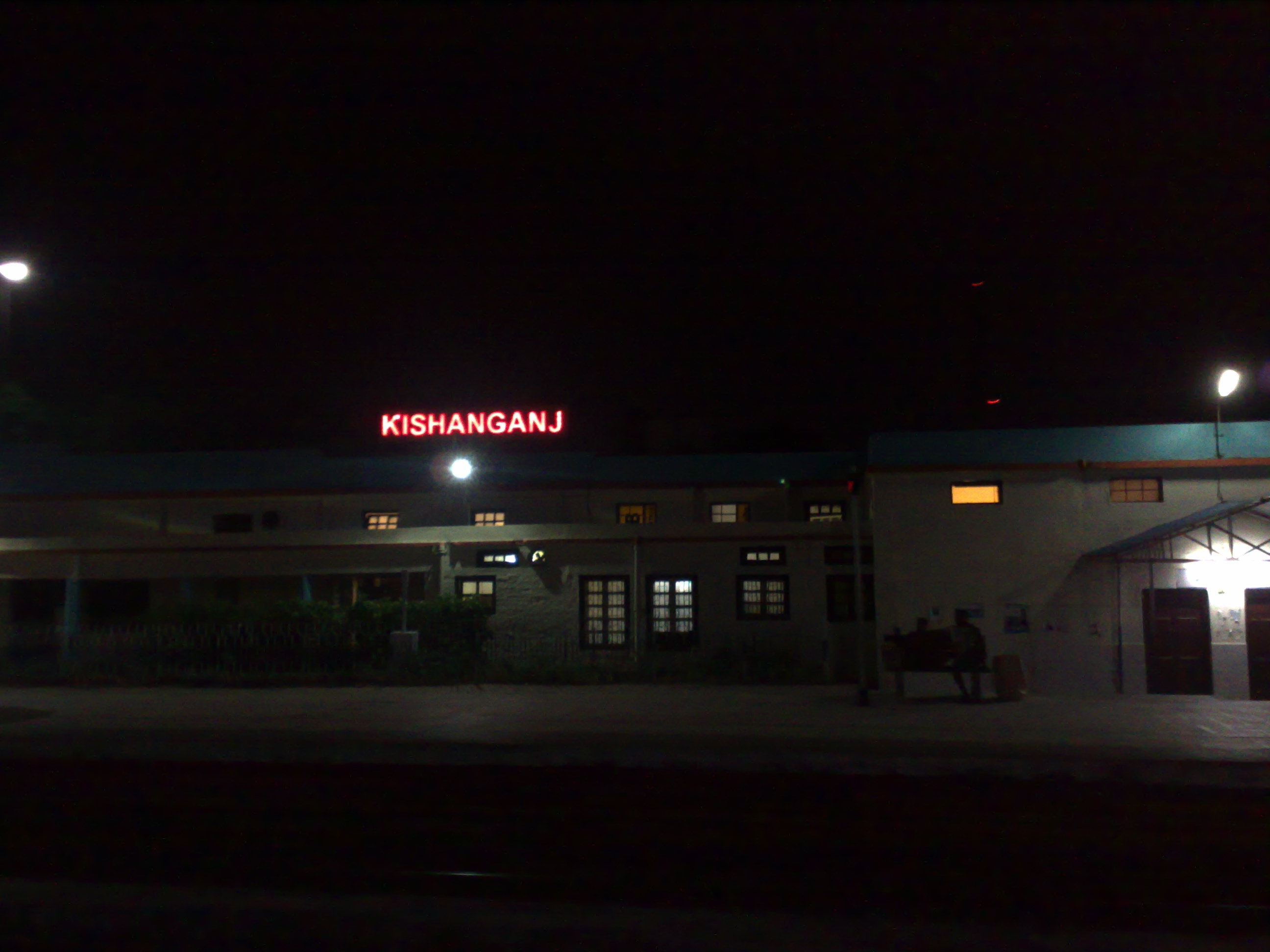

General information
- Location: NH 27, Kishanganj- 855107, Bihar; India
- Coordinates: 26.09802°N 87.95017°E
- Elevation: 53.00 metres (173.88 ft)
- System: Indian Railways station
- Owner: Indian Railways
- Operator: North East Frontier Railway
- Lines: Howrah–New Jalpaiguri line, Katihar–Siliguri line, Barauni–Guwahati line
- Platforms: 3
- Tracks: 8
- Connections: Taxi, auto, rickshaw and near bus stand

Construction
- Structure type: At grade
- Parking: Available
- Accessible: Yes

Other information
- Status: Functional
- Station code: KNE
- Zone(s): Northeast Frontier Railway
- Division(s): Katihar

History
- Opened: 1915
- Electrified: 2018
- Former names: Darjeeling Himalayan Railway
Location
- Location within India Location within Bihar Location within India
- Interactive map of Kishanganj

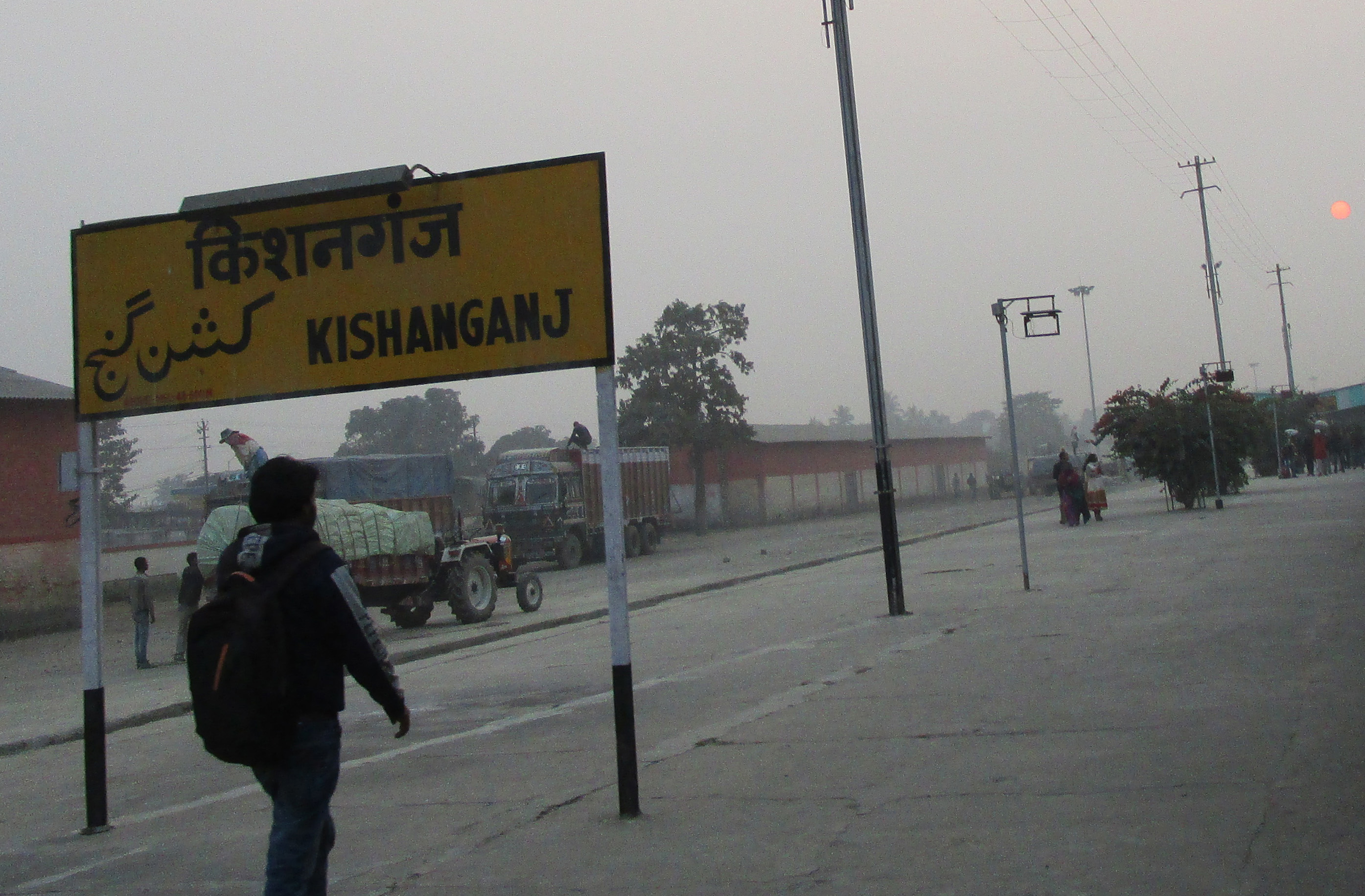
Kishanganj Railway Station nameplate, Bihar.

Kishanganj railway station serves Kishanganj city in Kishanganj district in the Indian state of Bihar. It is one of the important railway station, as it lies on the important railway lines, they are Howrah–New Jalpaiguri line, Katihar–Siliguri line, and Barauni–Guwahati line.

== History ==
Darjeeling Himalayan Railway extended its 2 ft (610 mm)-wide narrow-gauge line from Siliguri to Kishanganj in 1915. In 1948–50, the Kishanganj branch of the Darjeeling Himalayan Railway was taken over for the purpose of completing the Assam Rail Link project, converted to 1,000 mm (3 ft 3 3/8 in) metre gauge and connected to the North Eastern Railway network at Barsoi. The railway lines in the area started being converted to 1,676 mm (5 ft 6 in)-wide 5 ft 6 in (1,676 mm) broad gauge from the early 1960s.

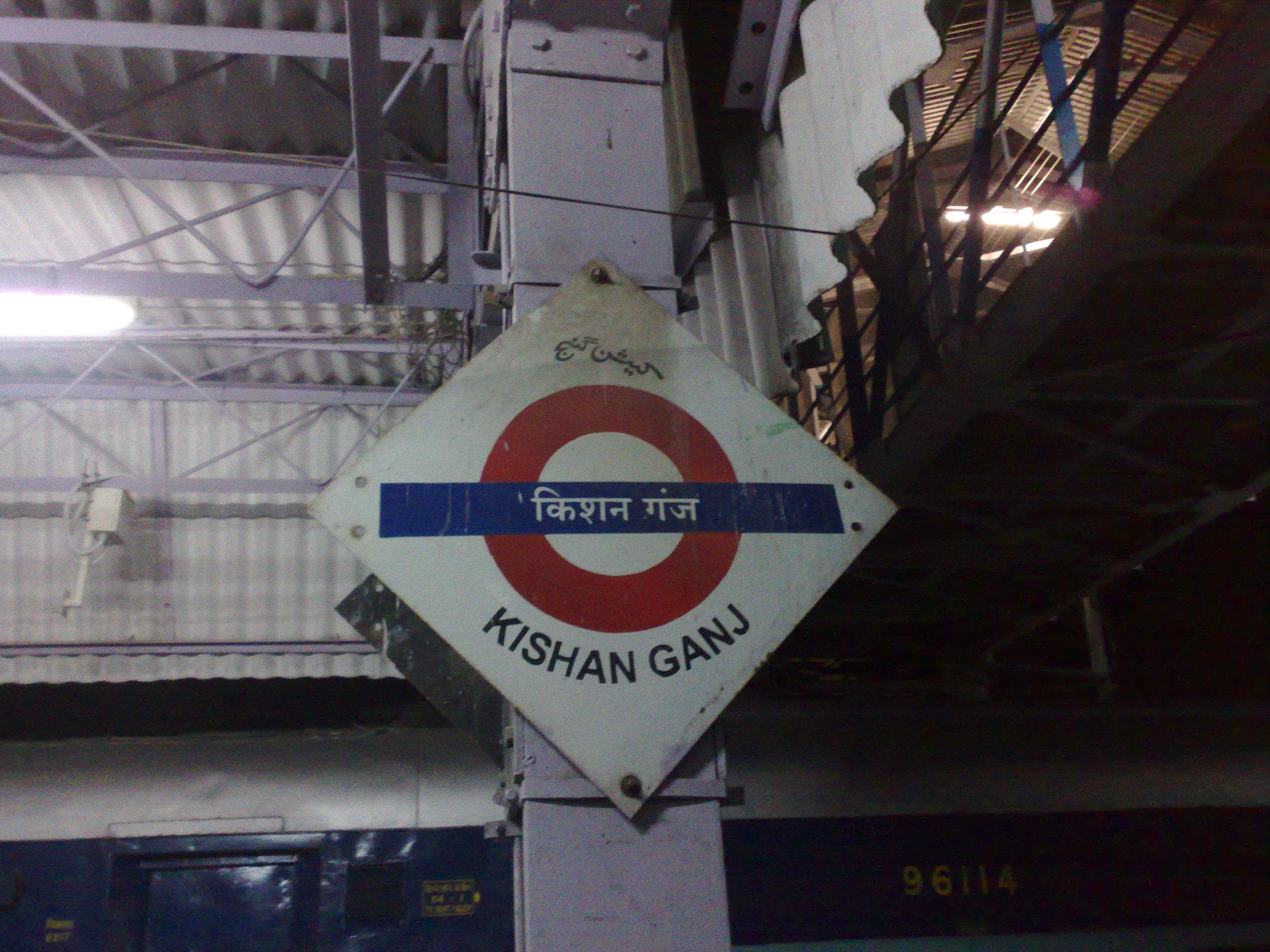
Kishanganj

== Amenities ==
Kishanganj railway station has the following amenities: computerized railway reservation system, waiting room, free google wifi, retiring room vegetarian and non-vegetarian refreshment room, bookstall and Government Railway Police (G.R.P) office.

=== Platforms ===
Kishanganj has two platforms and one under construction, one for Up and other for Down trains. A small platform is used for goods unloaded from freight trains. All the platforms are well connected with two foot overbridge (FOB).

== Trains ==
1. New Jalpaiguri–Howrah Shatabdi Express
2. New Delhi–Dibrugarh Rajdhani Express (Via New Tinsukia)
3. New Delhi–Dibrugarh Rajdhani Express (Via Moranhat)
4. New Delhi–Dibrugarh Rajdhani Express (Via Rangapara North)
5. Sir M. Visvesvaraya Terminal - Agartala Humsafar Express
6. Sealdah - Jalpaiguri Road Humsafar Express
7. Lokmanya Tilak Terminus–Agartala AC Superfast Express
8. Sir M. Visvesvaraya Terminal–Kamakhya AC Superfast Express
9. Nagercoil–New Jalpaiguri Amrit Bharat Express
10. SMVT Bengaluru–Alipurduar Amrit Bharat Express
11. Dibrugarh - Gomti Nagar Amrit Bharat Express
12. Kamakhya–Rohtak Amrit Bharat Express
13. Guwahati - New Delhi Poorvattar Sampark Kranti Superfast Express
14. New Jalpaiguri - MGR Chennai Central Superfast Express
15. New Jalpaiguri - Sealdah Superfast Darjeeling Mail
16. New Jalpaiguri - Tiruchchirappalli Amrit Bharat Express
17. New Jalpaiguri–New Delhi Superfast Express
18. New Jalpaiguri–Amritsar Karmabhoomi Express
19. New Jalpaiguri - Udaipur City SF Express
20. New Jalpaiguri - Digha Paharia Express
21. New Jalpaiguri - Sealdah Padatik Superfast Express
22. New Jalpaiguri - Ranchi Weekly Express
23. New Jalpaiguri -Rajendra Nagar Capital Express
24. New Jalpaiguri–Malda Town Express
25. New Jalpaiguri - Sitamarhi Express
26. New Jalpaiguri–Amritsar Amrit Bharat Express
27. Silchar - Thiruvananthapuram Aronai Superfast Express
28. Silchar - Coimbatore Superfast Express
29. Silchar–Secunderabad Express
30. Silchar - Sealdah Kanchanjunga Express
31. Dibrugarh–Kanyakumari Vivek Express
32. New Tinsukia–Chennai Tambaram Express
33. Dibrugarh - Lokmanya Tilak Terminus Superfast Express
34. Dibrugarh-Lalgarh Avadh Assam Express
35. Dibrugarh–Kolkata Superfast Express
36. Charlapalli–Kamakhya Amrit Bharat Express
37. Dibrugarh-Howrah Kamrup Express via Guwahati
38. Dibrugarh–Howrah Kamrup Express Via Rangapara North
39. Silghat Town - Tambaram Nagaon Express
40. Silghat Town - Kolkata Kaziranga Express
41. Agartala - Deoghar Weekly Express
42. Sabroom - Sealdah Kanchanjunga Express
43. New Tinsukia–Bengaluru Weekly Express
44. Dibrugarh–Rajendra Nagar Weekly Express
45. Guwahati - Jammu Tawi Lohit Express
46. Guwahati- Sir M. Visvesvaraya Terminal Kaziranga Superfast Express
47. Guwahati - Bikaner Express
48. Guwahati - Okha Dwarka Express
49. Guwahati - Barmer Express
50. Guwahati-Jammu Tawi Amarnath Express
51. Guwahati - Lokmanya Tilak Terminus Express
52. Guwahati-Howrah Saraighat Superfast Express
53. Guwahati - Kolkata Garib Rath Express
54. Guwahati–Rajendra Nagar Capital Express
55. Kamakhya - Lokmanya Tilak Terminus Karmabhoomi Express.
56. Kamakhya - Udaipur City Kavi Guru Express
57. Kamakhya - Jodhpur, Bhagat Ki Kothi Express
58. Kamakhya - Delhi Brahmaputra Mail
59. Kamakhya - Dr. Ambedkar Nagar Express
60. Kamakhya - Ranchi Express
61. Kamakhya - Puri Express via Howrah
62. Kamakhya–Gomti Nagar Superfast Express
63. Kamakhya - Puri Express (via Adra)
64. Kamakhya–Gaya Express
65. Kamakhya–Anand Vihar Express
66. Kamakhya - Delhi Northeast Express
67. Kamakhya - Pune Express
68. Alipurduar - Delhi Mahananda Express
69. Alipurduar - Sealdah Kanchan Kanya Express
70. Alipurduar - Secunderabad Express
71. New Alipurdiar - Sealdah Teesta Torsha Express
72. Dibrugarh - Deogarh Express
73. Bamanhat - Sealdah Uttar Banga Express
74. Kolkata - Haldibari Tri-Weekly Express
75. Kamakhya-Patna Capital Express
76. Siliguri Junction-Balurghat Express
77. Siliguri - Radhikapur Express
78. Jogbani–Siliguri Town Intercity Express
79. Sairang - Kolkata Express
80. Siliguri Junction-Katihar Express
81. Jhajha–Dibrugarh Weekly Express
82. Kishanganj–Ajmer Garib Nawaz Express

Preceding station	Indian Railways	Following station
Panjipara towards ?	Northeast Frontier Railway zone Katihar–Siliguri line	Tauheed towards ?
