= Padatik Express =

Train in India

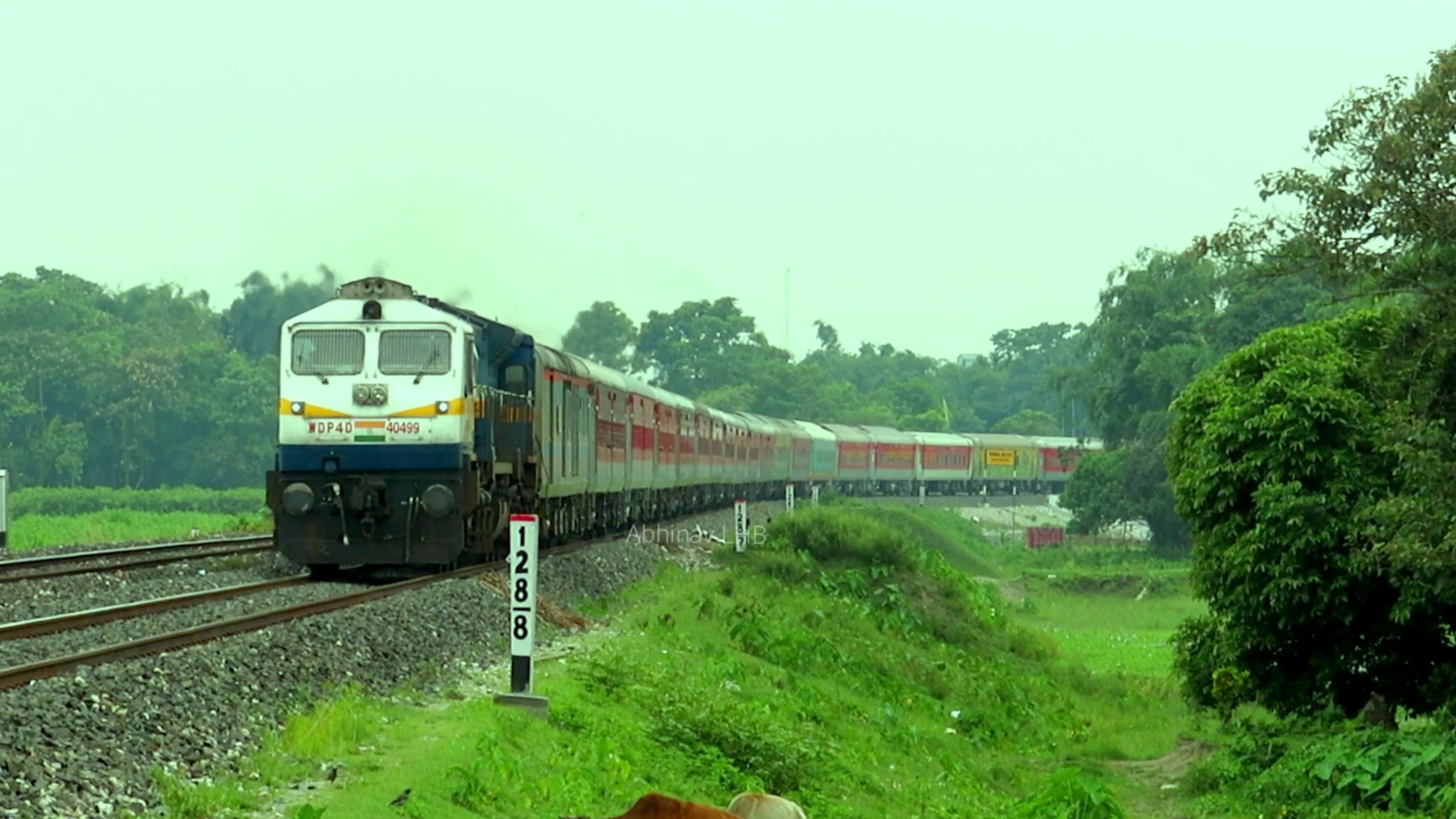
- First run of Padatik Express with LHB coaches.

Overview
- Service type: Superfast
- Locale: West Bengal
- First service: 4 October 2009; 16 years ago
- Current operator: Indian Railways

Route
- Termini: Sealdah (SDAH); New Alipurduar (NOQ)
- Stops: 11
- Distance travelled: 719 km (447 mi)
- Average journey time: 13 hours 5 minutes
- Service frequency: Daily
- Train number: 12377 / 12378

On-board services
- Classes: Second Seating, Sleeper class, AC 2-tier, AC 3-tier, AC First Class, AC First-cum-Second class
- Seating arrangements: Yes
- Sleeping arrangements: Yes
- Catering facilities: E-catering only
- Observation facilities: Large windows
- Other facilities: Below the seats

Technical
- Rolling stock: LHB coach
- Track gauge: 1,676 mm (5 ft 6 in); Broad Gauge
- Operating speed: 55 km/h (34 mph) average including halts.
Route map
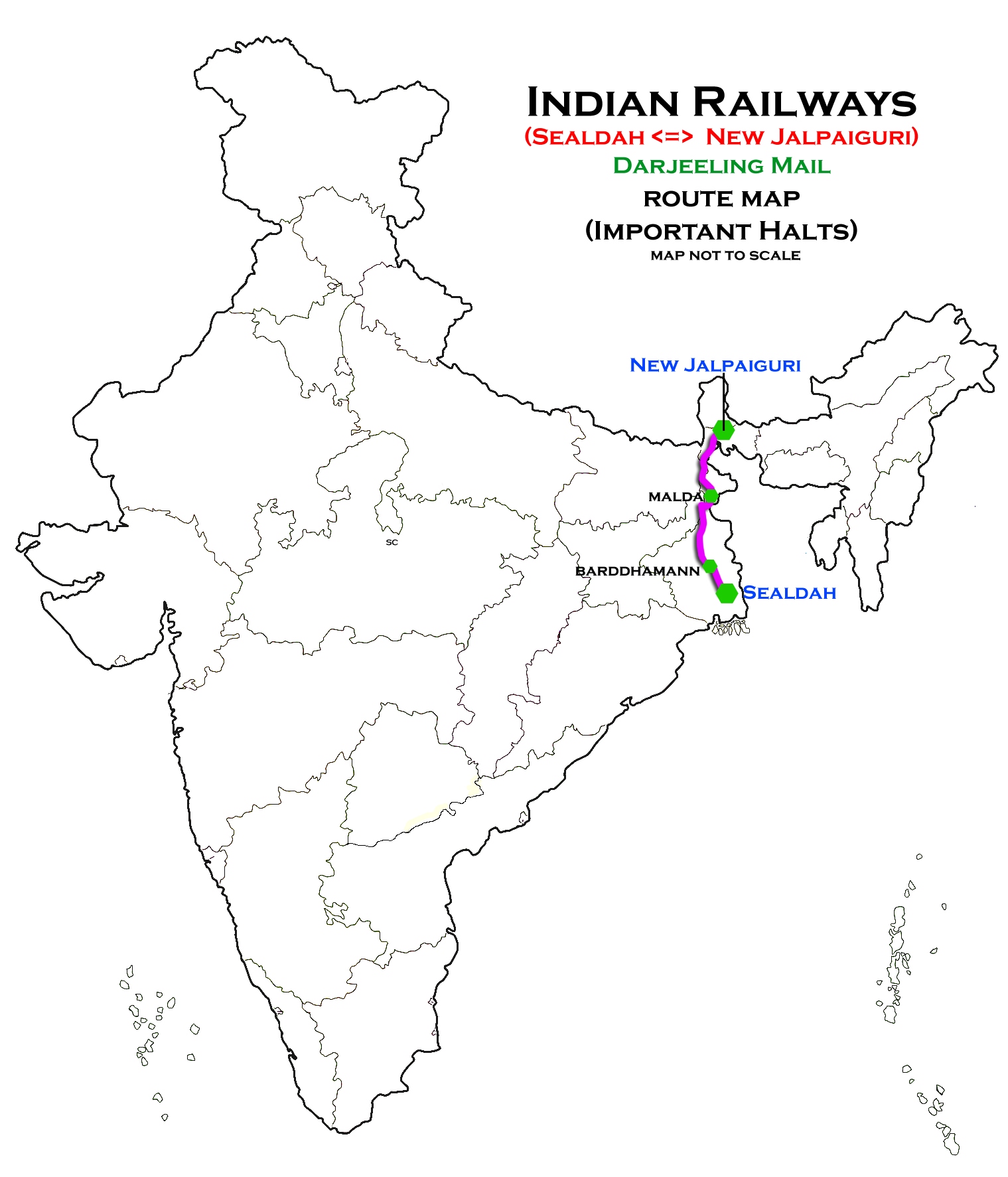

The 12377 / 12378 Padatik Superfast Express is a daily Superfast train which runs between Sealdah and New Alipurduar in West Bengal via Barddhaman, Rampurhat, New Jalpaiguri Junction.

The train covers a distance of 719 kilometres (447 mi). The train belongs to the Eastern Railway zone of Indian Railways and travel time over the whole route is just over 12 hours. This train is named after renowned Bengali poet Subhash Mukhopadhyay's book Padatik.

The train is numbered as 12377 / 12378 and offers all the available classes of travel on Indian Railways-AC First Class (H1), AC First-cum-Second Class (HA1), AC 2-tier (A1-A2), AC 3-tier (B1–B6), Sleeper Class (S1–S5) and Unreserved Class. The train is composed of 21 coaches.

== Route & halts ==
The important halts of the train are:

1. Sealdah (Starts)
2. Barddhaman Junction
3. Bolpur Shantiniketan
4. Rampurhat Junction
5. Malda Town
6. Samsi
7. Dalkhola
8. Kishanganj
9. New Jalpaiguri Junction (Siliguri)
10. Jalpaiguri Road
11. New Changrabandha
12. Mathabhanga
13. New Cooch Behar Junction
14. New Alipurduar (Ends)

Note: Bold letters indicates Major Railway Stations/Major Cities.

== Coach composition ==
Legends
EOG/SLR	PC	MIL	H	A	HA	B	AB	G	K	E	C	S	D	GEN/UR
Generator cum luggage van	Pantry car or Hot buffet car	Military coach	First AC (1A)	Second AC (2A)	First AC cum Second AC	Third AC (3A)	Third AC cum Second AC	Third AC economy (3E)	Anubhuti coach (K)	Executive chair car (EC)	AC Chair car (CC)	Sleeper class (SL)	Second seating (2S)	General or Unreserved
	Loco and other service coach													
	AC coach													
	Non-AC coach													

Sealdah to New Alipurduar

Loco	1	2	3	4	5	6	7	8	9	10	11	12	13	14	15	16	17	18	19	20	21
	EOG	GS	GS	GS	GS	S1	S2	S3	S4	S5	B1	B2	B3	B4	B5	B6	A1	A2	HA1	H1	EOG

New Alipurduar to Sealdah

Loco	1	2	3	4	5	6	7	8	9	10	11	12	13	14	15	16	17	18	19	20	21
	EOG	H1	HA1	A2	A1	B6	B5	B4	B3	B2	B1	S5	S4	S3	S2	S1	GS	GS	GS	GS	EOG

== Traction ==
earlier was WDM-3A. As the route is now fully electrified, it is hauled by a Sealdah based WAP 7 electric locomotive and so was Gooty-based WDP-4 from end to end.

== Gallery ==
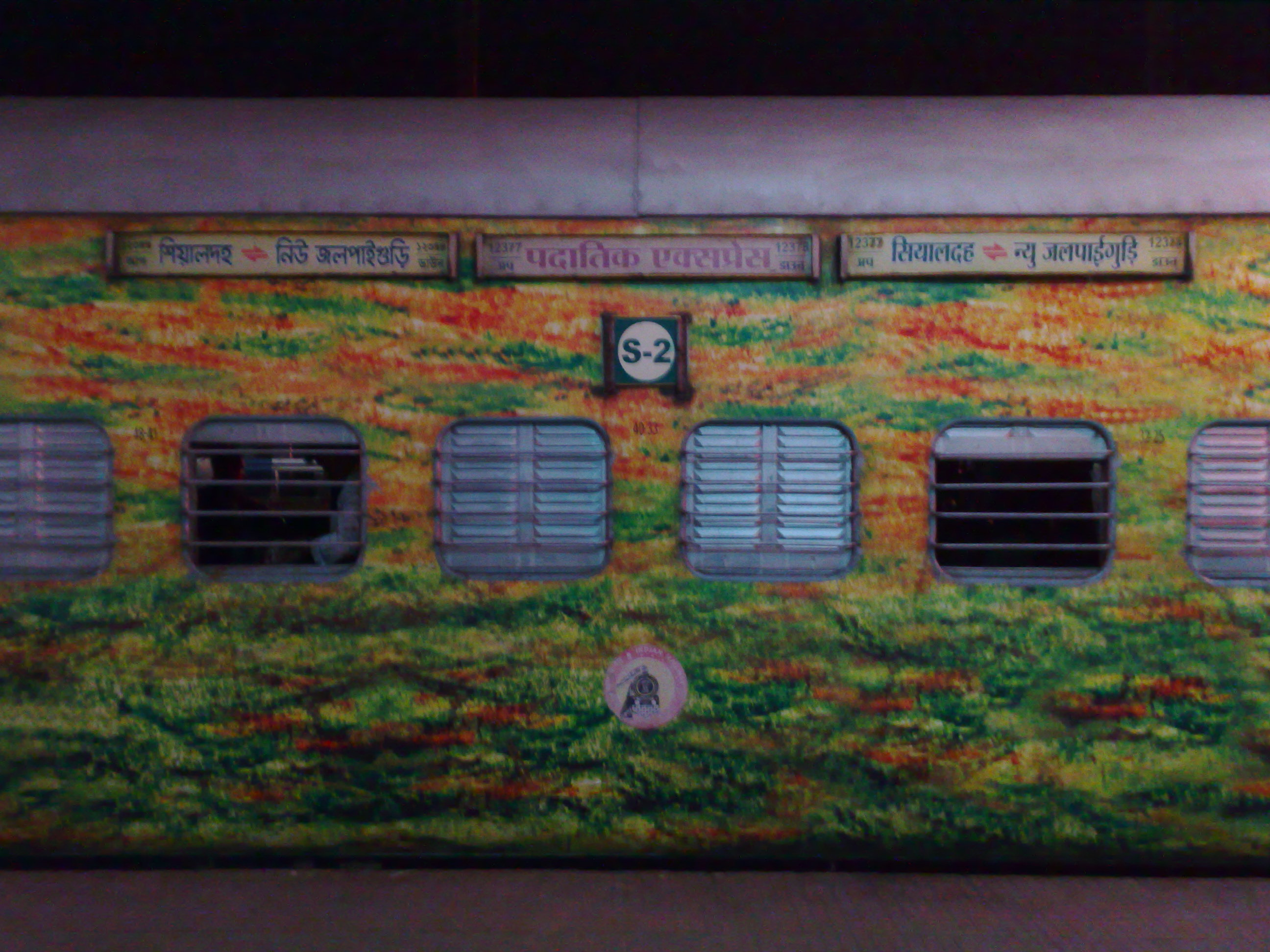
Padatik Express – Sleeper Class coach

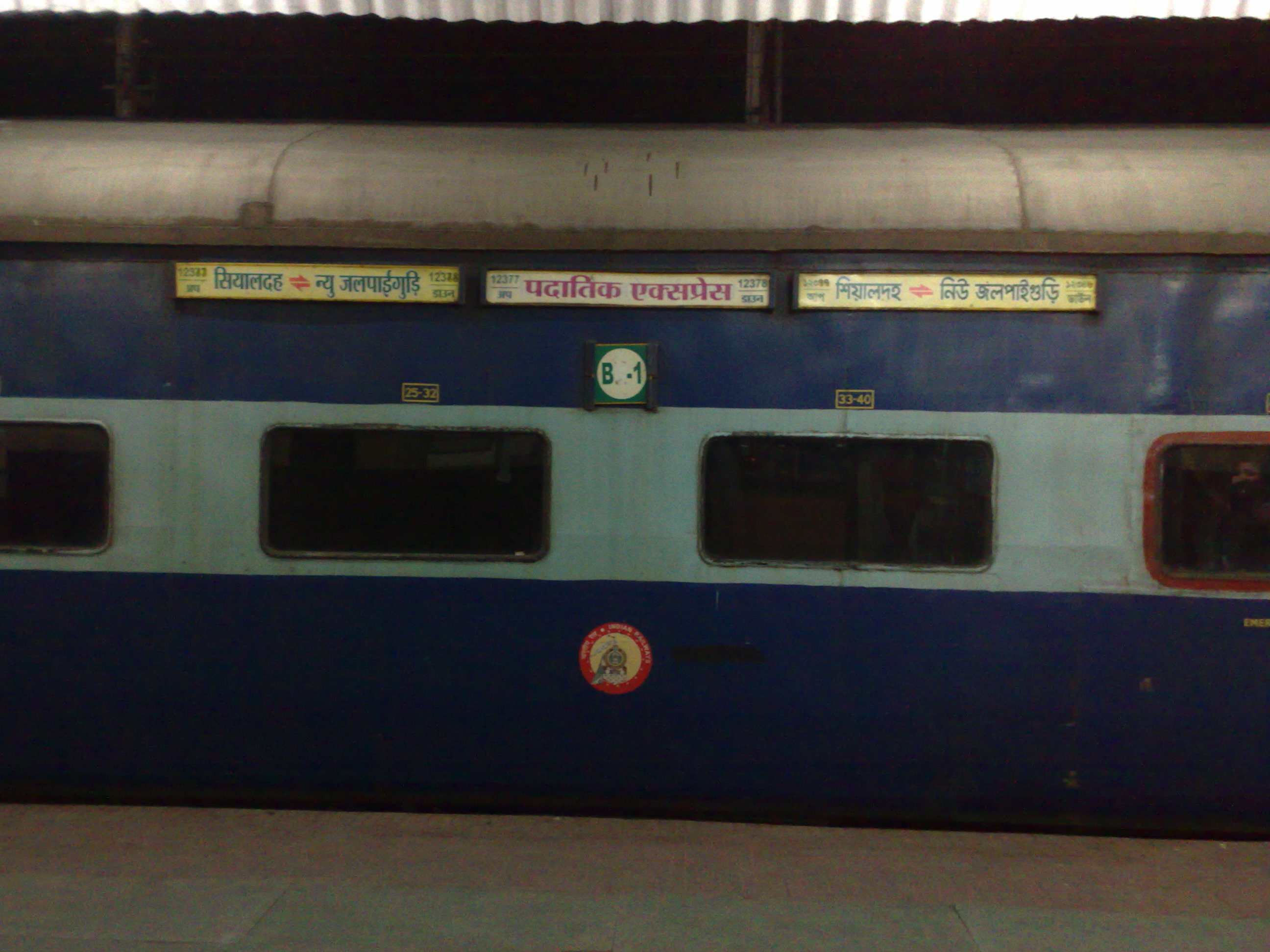
Padatik Express – AC 3 tier coach

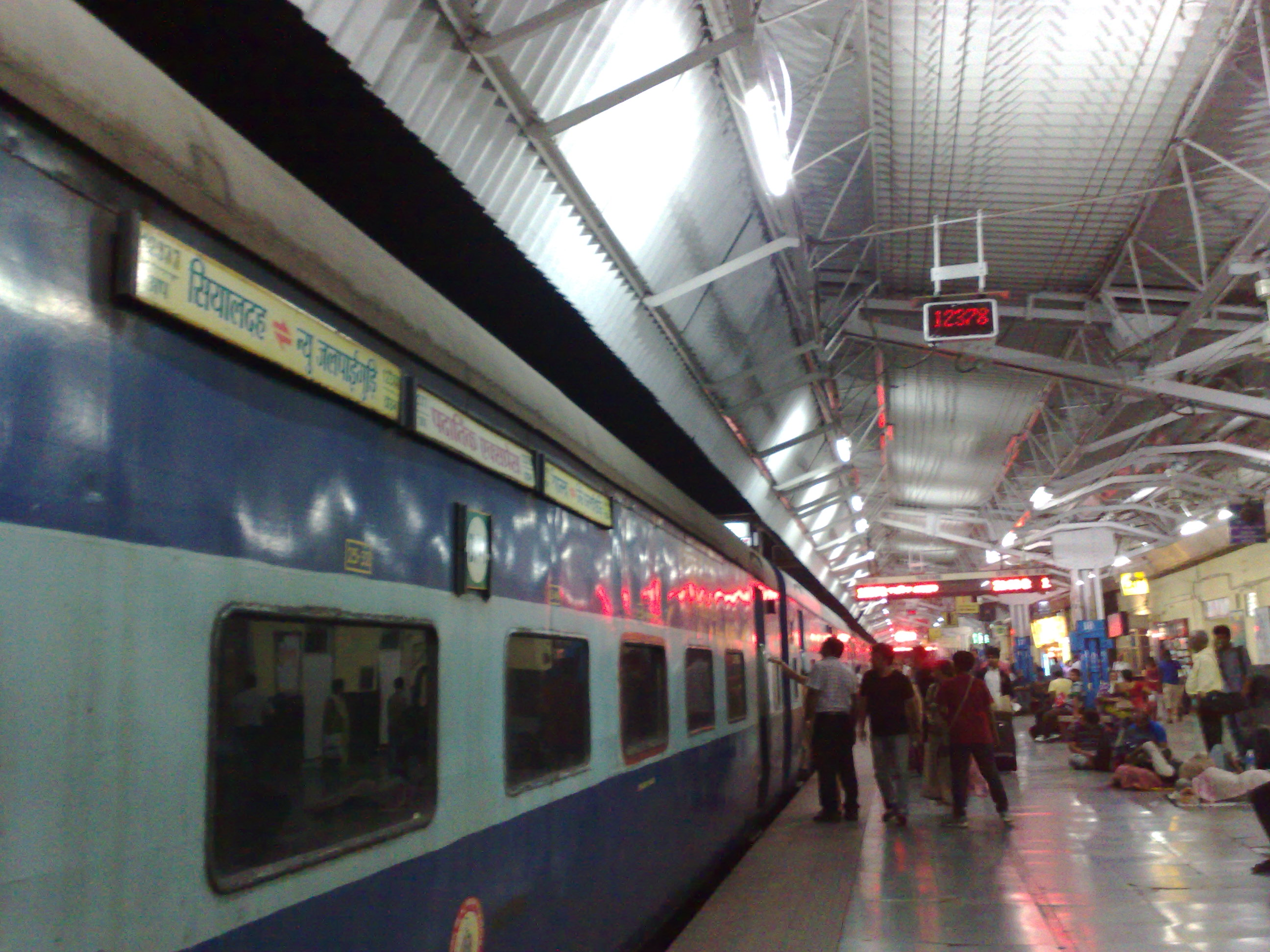
Padatik Express at NJP Junction

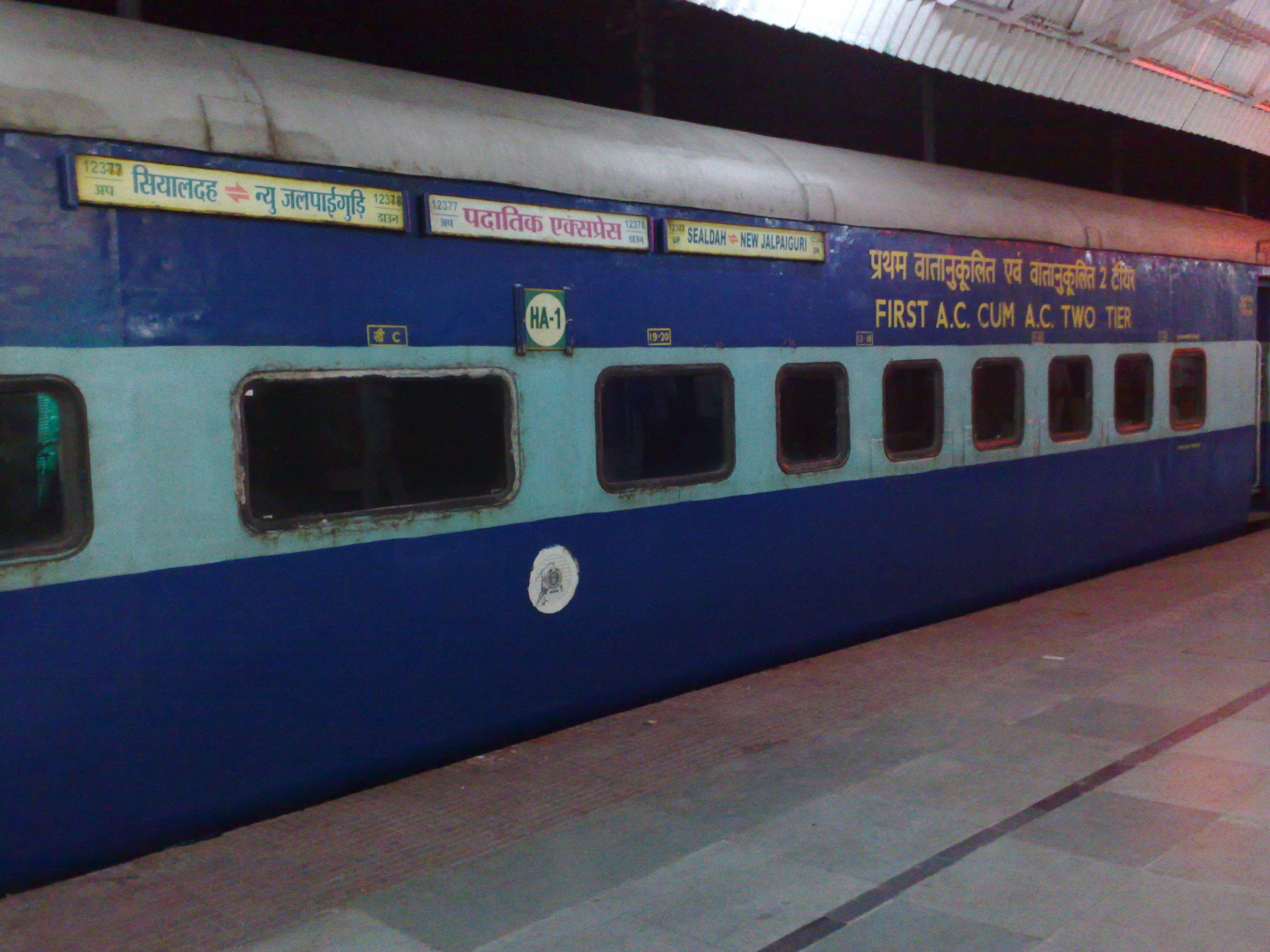
Padatik Express – AC First Class cum AC 2 tier coach

== See also ==
- Howrah–New Jalpaiguri line
- Darjeeling Mail
- New Jalpaiguri–Howrah Shatabdi Express
