= Howrah–New Jalpaiguri Shatabdi Express =

Shatabdi Express train in India

Howrah Junction – New Jalpaiguri Junction Shatabdi Express

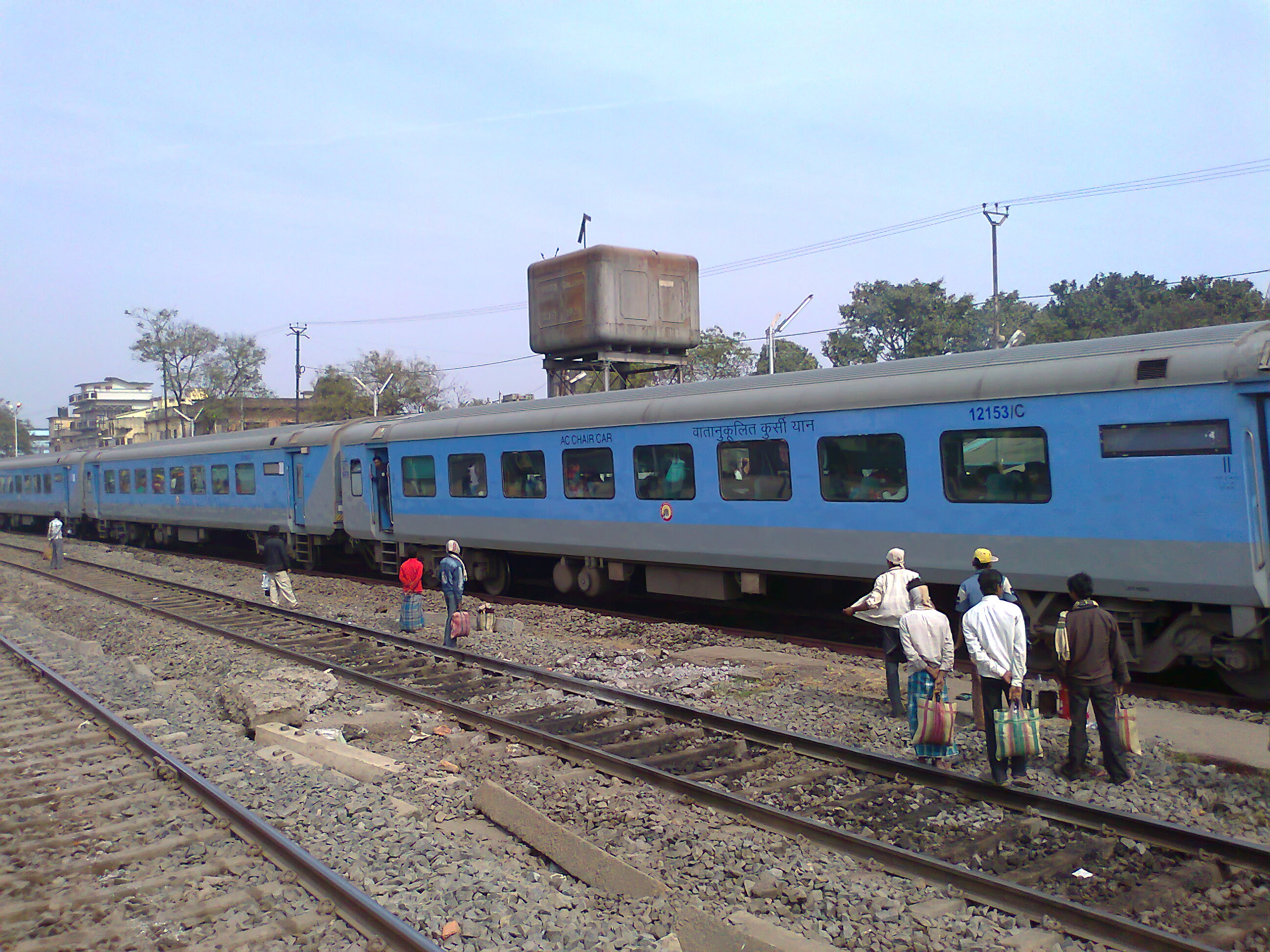
- HWH–NJP Shatabdi Express at Pakur

Overview
- Service type: Shatabdi Express
- Status: Operating
- Locale: West Bengal, Jharkhand and Bihar
- First service: July 11, 2012; 14 years ago
- Current operator: North East Frontier Railway

Route
- Termini: Howrah (Kolkata) (HWH); New Jalpaiguri (Siliguri) (NJP)
- Stops: 6
- Distance travelled: 561 km (349 mi) (chargeable distance may be different but it is same when it is being written)
- Average journey time: 8 hrs 22.5 mins (average of both directions)
- Service frequency: 6 days a week (Note: Except Sundays)
- Train number: 12041/12042
- Line used: Howrah–New Jalpaiguri line

On-board services
- Classes: Executive Chair Car, AC Chair Car and Vistadome.
- Seating arrangements: Available
- Catering facilities: Yes
- Observation facilities: LHB coach
- Baggage facilities: Overhead racks

Technical
- Rolling stock: LHB coach
- Track gauge: 1,676 mm (5 ft 6 in)
- Operating speed: 67 km/h (42 mph) 130 kmph maximum permissible between Howrah and Khana
Route map
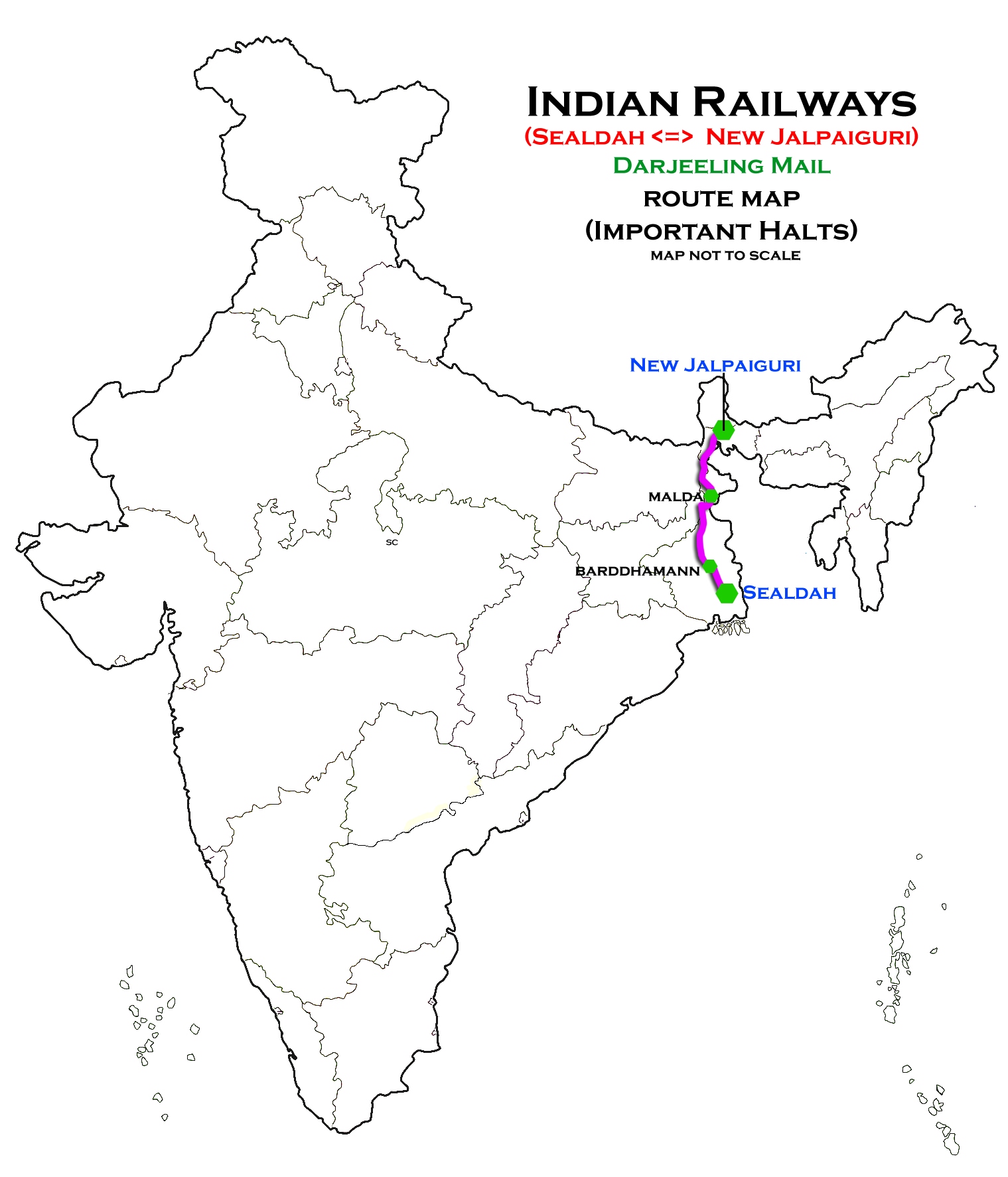

The Howrah–New Jalpaiguri Shatabdi Express is a Shatabdi class train of Indian Railways connecting Kolkata and Siliguri, West Bengal's two most important cities via Bardhaman & Rampurhat . It is the second fastest train after Howrah–New Jalpaiguri Vande Bharat Express in the Howrah – New Jalpaiguri section covering a distance of 561 km (chargeable distance may be different but it is same when it is being written) in a span of about 8 hours.

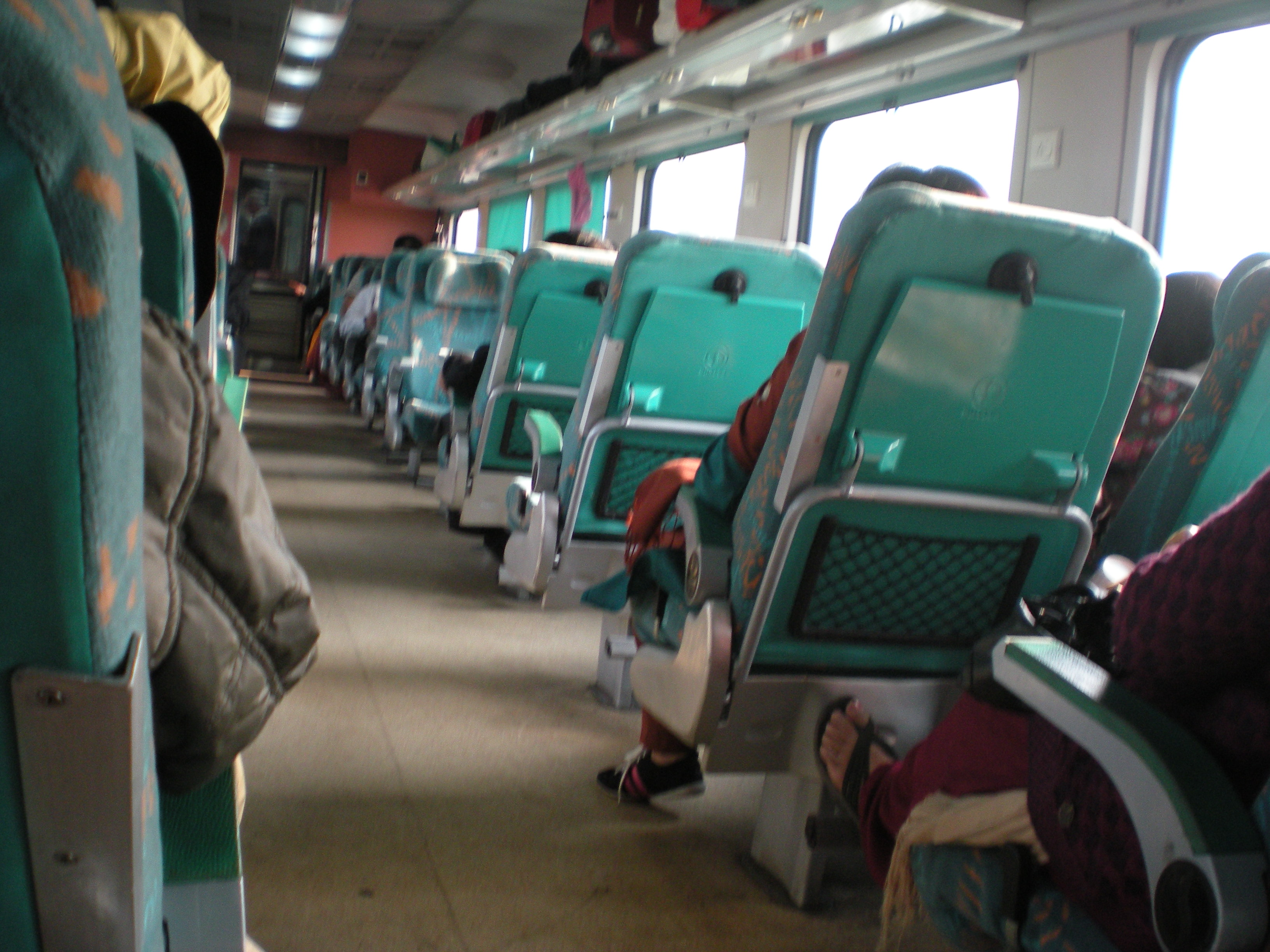
Interior of AC Executive Chair Car

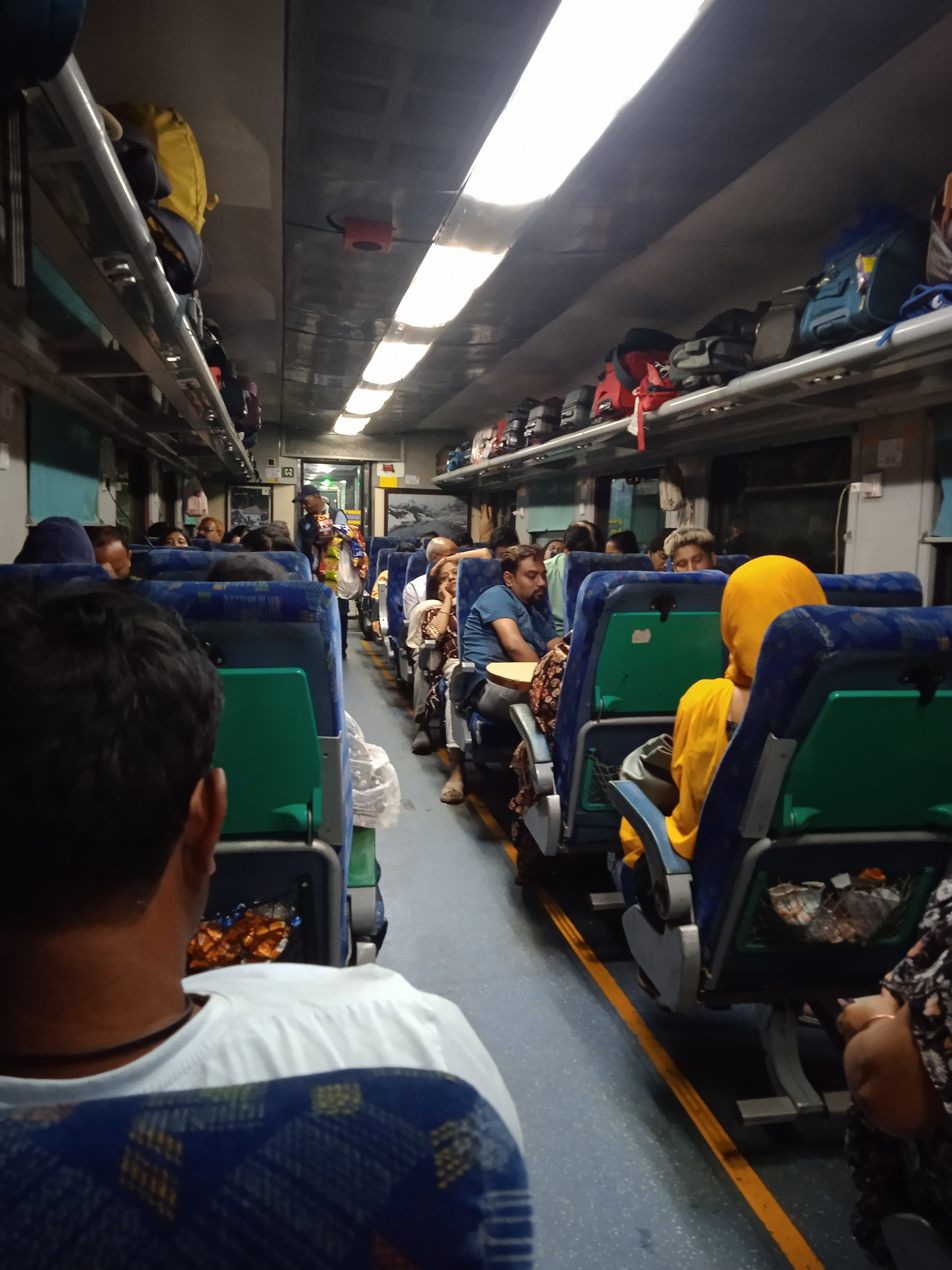
Interior of AC chair car of HWH - NJP Shatabdi express

== Overview ==
West Bengal chief minister Mamata Banerjee and the then railway minister Mukul Roy flagged it off from New Jalpaiguri Junction railway station on 12 July 2012, though this train was passed in Railway Budget 2012–13 by the then Railway Minister Dinesh Trivedi. The train carried nine AC Chair Cars and one AC Executive Chair Car. The train belongs to the Northeast Frontier Railway zone of Indian Railways.

Before the electrification of Jalpaiguri-Howrah stretch, this Shatabdi Express was the fastest Diesel Locomotive hauled train of Indian Railways having its diesel link of class WDP-4, WDP-4B or WDP-4D provided by Siliguri Junction (SGUJ) DLS. On 10 January 2020 the traction of the train was changed to electric and the regular link was changed to class WAP-5 or WAP-7 of Howrah Junction (HWH) ELS.

This is a very popular train on the Howrah - New Jalpaiguri route. It links the capital city of West Bengal, Kolkata with the largest city in North Bengal, Siliguri traversing through various other important places in the state.

== Amenities ==
This train has LHB coach, providing reclining seats, on-board meals are available and are included in the ticket fare. On 10 March 2018, it was upgraded to the Swarna Standards of Indian Railways.

Loco	1	2	3	4	5	6	7	8	9	10	11	12	13	14	15
	EOG	C1	C2	C3	C4	C5	C6	C7	C8	C9	C10	E1	E2	EV1	EOG

== Speed ==
Its all coaches are of air conditioned LHB coach type which is capable of reaching 160 kmph but it does not touch. Sometimes people become confused because according to Indian Railways Permanent Way Manual (IRPWM) on Indian Railways website or Indian Railway Institute of Civil Engineering website, the BG (Broad Gauge) lines have been classified into six groups ‘A’ to ‘E’ on the basis of the future maximum permissible speeds but it may not be same as present speed.

The maximum permissible speed of the train and route is 130 kmph between Howrah and Khana which is about 108 km part via Dankuni of Howrah - New Delhi route and speed is less in the rest part and the speed in rest part is same as maximum speed of the route which is 110 kmph over KAN-BDAG (Khana - Beldanga) , presently unknown but 100 kmph in 2011 between Beldanga (after Gumani - GMAN) and Malda Town (MLDT) 45 km long part, 110 kmph between Malda Town and New Jalpaiguri which is a part of Guwahati – Malda Town route having 110 kmph sectional speed which will be increased to 130 kmph between Malda Town and New Jalpaiguri by March 2023

== Route & halts ==
The stations and the stoppage time and platform no. are as follows-

Check Train Timings Before Boarding

- Arrival Starts
  Howrah Junction (Starts)
  Departure 02:25 PM
  0 Km Platform 11
- Arrival 03:17 PM
  Bardhaman Junction (2 minutes)
  Departure 03:19 PM
  93 Km Platform 1
- Arrival 04:06 PM
  Bolpur Shantiniketan (2 minutes)
  Departure 04:08 PM
  145 Km Platform 1
- Arrival 05:01 PM
  Rampurhat Junction (2 minutes)
  Departure 05:03 PM
  205 Km Platform 2
- Arrival 06:28 PM
  New Farakka (1 minute)
  Departure 06:29 PM
  294 Km Platform 3
- Arrival 07:15 PM
  Malda Town (5 minutes)
  Departure 07:20 PM
  329 Km Platform 5
- Barsoi Junction (1 minute)
  419 Km Platform 2
- Kishanganj (2 minutes)
  477 Km Platform 1
- New Jalpaiguri Junction (Ends)
  564 Km Platform 1

== Schedule ==
The schedule of this 12041/12042 New Jalpaipuri Jn - Howrah Jn Shatabdi Express is given below:-

NJP - HWH - NJP Shatabdi Express
12042 (Except Sunday)		Stations	12041 (Except Sunday)	
Arrival	Departure	Stations	Arrival	Departure
-NIL-	05:30	New Jalpaiguri Junction	22:50	-NIL-
06:28	06:30	Kishanganj Junction	21:15	21:17
07:15	07:16	Barsoi Junction	20:30	20:31
08:35	08:40	Malda Town	19:15	19:20
09:12	09:13	New Farakka Junction	18:28	18:29
10:27	10:29	Rampurhat Junction	17:01	17:03
11:02	11:04	Bolpur Shantiniketan	16:06	16:08
12:05	12:07	Barddhaman Junction	15:17	15:19
13:45	-NIL-	Howrah Junction	-NIL-	14:25

== See also ==
- Howrah–New Jalpaiguri Vande Bharat Express
- Howrah–New Jalpaiguri line
