= Dauram Madhepura railway station =

Railway station in Madhepura, Bihar, India

Dauram Madhepura दौरम मधेपुरा
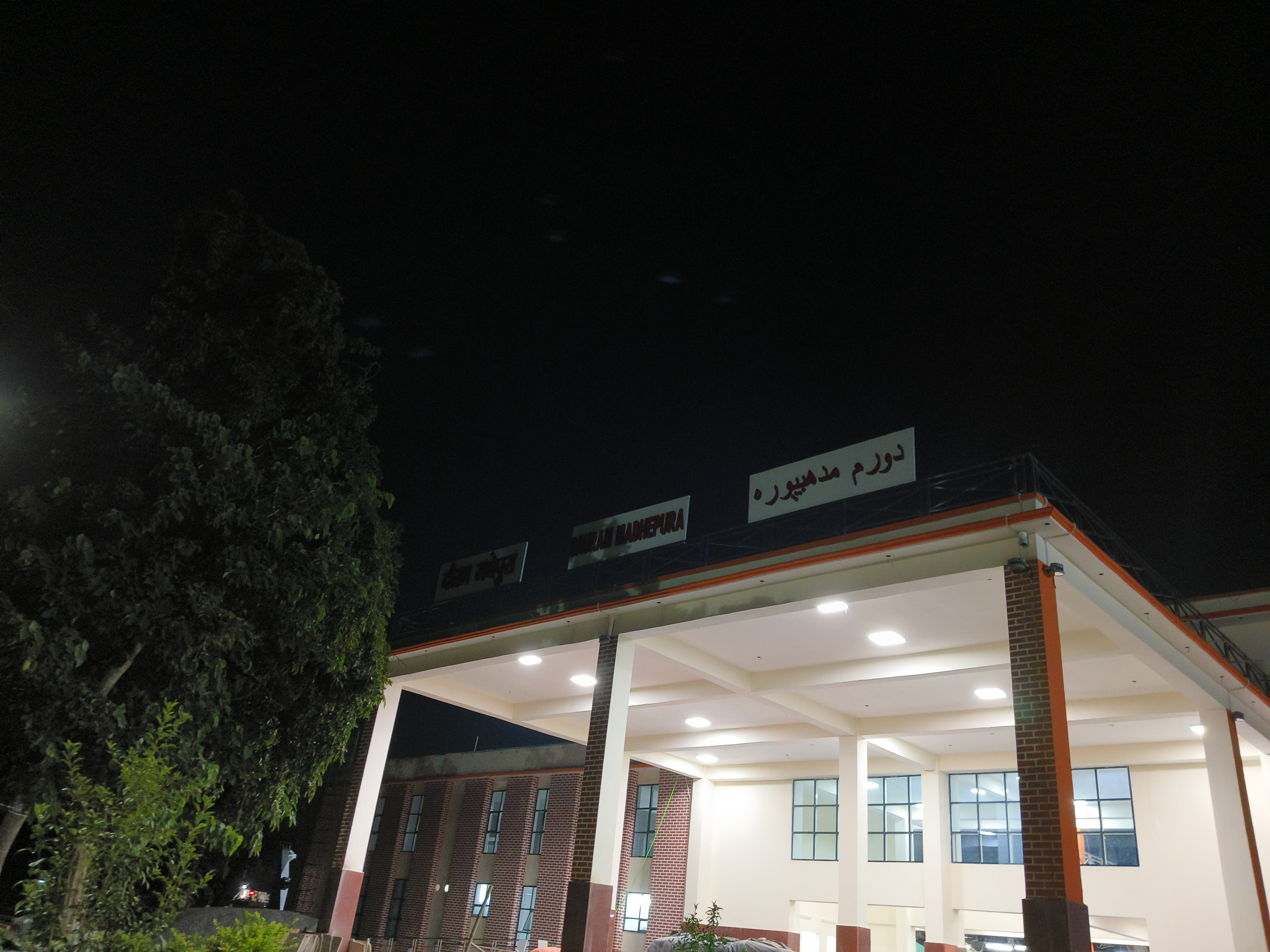
- Dauram Madhepura railway station

General information
- Location: NH-231, Madhepura, Bihar – 852113; India
- Coordinates: 25.9088173°N 86.7831701°E
- Elevation: 49 metres (161 ft)
- System: Indian Railways station
- Owner: Indian Railways
- Operator: East Central Railway zone
- Line: Saharsa–Purnia line
- Platforms: 2
- Tracks: 3 (broad gauge, electrified)
- Connections: Auto stand, bus services

Construction
- Structure type: Standard (on-ground station)
- Parking: Available
- Cycle facilities: Yes
- Accessible: Available

Other information
- Status: Functional
- Station code: DMH
- Zone(s): East Central Railway
- Division(s): Samastipur
- Website: www.irctc.co.in/nget/train-search

History
- Electrified: Yes

Passengers
- Daily commuters and regional passengers

Services
Trains halt on the Saharsa–Purnia line

Other services
Location
- Location within India Location within Bihar

Dauram Madhepura railway station (station code: DMH) is a railway station in Madhepura district, Bihar, India. It is located beside National Highway 231 connecting Maheshkhunt, Madhepura and Purnia, and primarily serves Madhepura and the surrounding areas. The station falls under the Samastipur railway division of the East Central Railway zone and lies on the rail line between Saharsa Junction and Purnia Junction. Several passenger and express trains halt at this station.

== History ==
The Saharsa–Purnia section, on which Dauram Madhepura lies, was originally built as a metre-gauge railway line in the 1950s. It was converted to broad gauge and reopened for traffic on 10 June 2016, as part of Indian Railways’ modernization programme. With this upgrade, Dauram Madhepura station was electrified and provided with improved passenger facilities.

== Location and layout ==
The station is located on National Highway 231 in Madhepura district, Bihar. It lies about 21 km west of Saharsa Junction and 60 km east of Purnia Junction on the Saharsa–Purnia line. Dauram Madhepura has two platforms, three electrified tracks, and basic passenger amenities such as shelters, seating, and parking.

== Facilities ==
The station has ticket counters, waiting areas, sheltered seating, small kiosks for tea and snacks, parking and bicycle facilities, and free Wi-Fi provided by RailTel. An auto stand outside the station provides local connectivity.

== Gallery ==
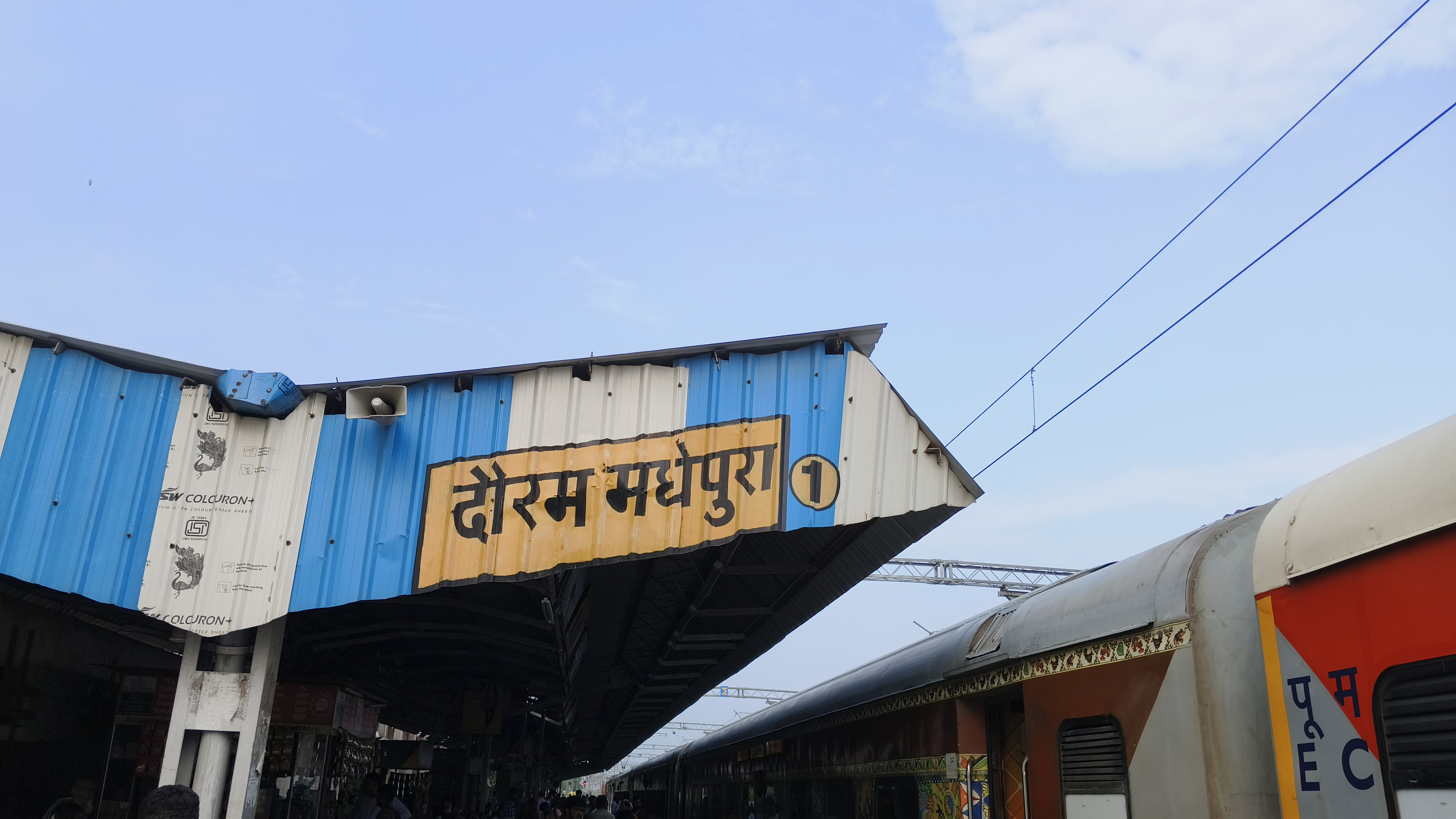
Dauram Madhepura Railway Station Platform 1

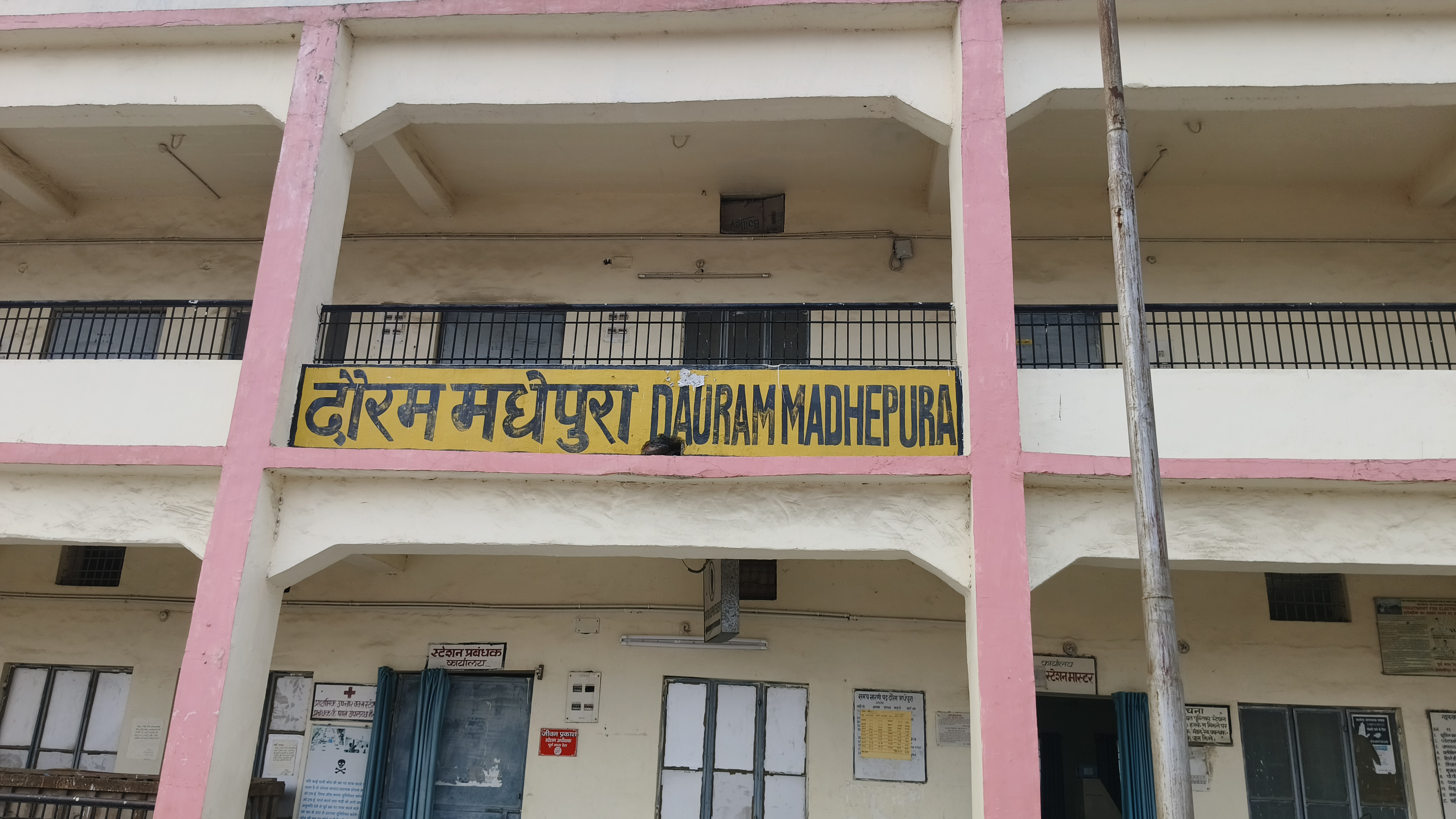
Dauram Madhepura Railway Station Office Building

== Train services ==
About 24 trains halt at Dauram Madhepura daily, including express, MEMU, and passenger services.

=== Major trains ===
- Hate Bazare Express (via Purnea) (13169/13170) – Sealdah ↔ Purnia ↔ Saharsa
- Janaki Intercity Express (15283/15284) – Manihari ↔ Jaynagar
- Janhit Express (13205/13206) – Patliputra ↔ Purnia Court
- Kosi Express (18625/18626) – Hatia ↔ Purnia Court
- Purnia Court–Amritsar Jan Sewa Express (14617/14618) – Purnia Court ↔ Amritsar
- Jogbani–Danapur Vande Bharat Express (26301/26302) – Jogbani ↔ Danapur

=== Passenger/MEMU services ===
- Dauram Madhepura–Saharsa MEMU (63359/63360)
- Saharsa–Purnia DEMU (75257/75258/75259/75260/75261/75262)
- Saharsa–Purnia Court DEMU / Fast Passenger (75225/75226/55569/55570)
- Saharsa–Bihariganj DEMU (75263/75264)

== Passenger volume ==
According to RailYatri, the station is a Grade D (NSG-5) station, handling moderate daily passenger traffic. It is busiest in the mornings and evenings due to commuter flows toward Saharsa and Purnia.

== Regional importance ==
The station provides vital rail connectivity to villages in northern Madhepura district, including Budhma, Mithai, and Karukhirhar Nagar. It plays an important role in connecting rural areas with commercial hubs like Saharsa, Purnia, and Madhepura, and supports the transport of agricultural produce, students, and workers.

== See also ==
- Saharsa Junction railway station
- Purnia Junction railway station
- Saharsa–Purnia line
- East Central Railway zone
