= Erode–Jogbani Amrit Bharat Express =

Amrit Bharat Express train route in India

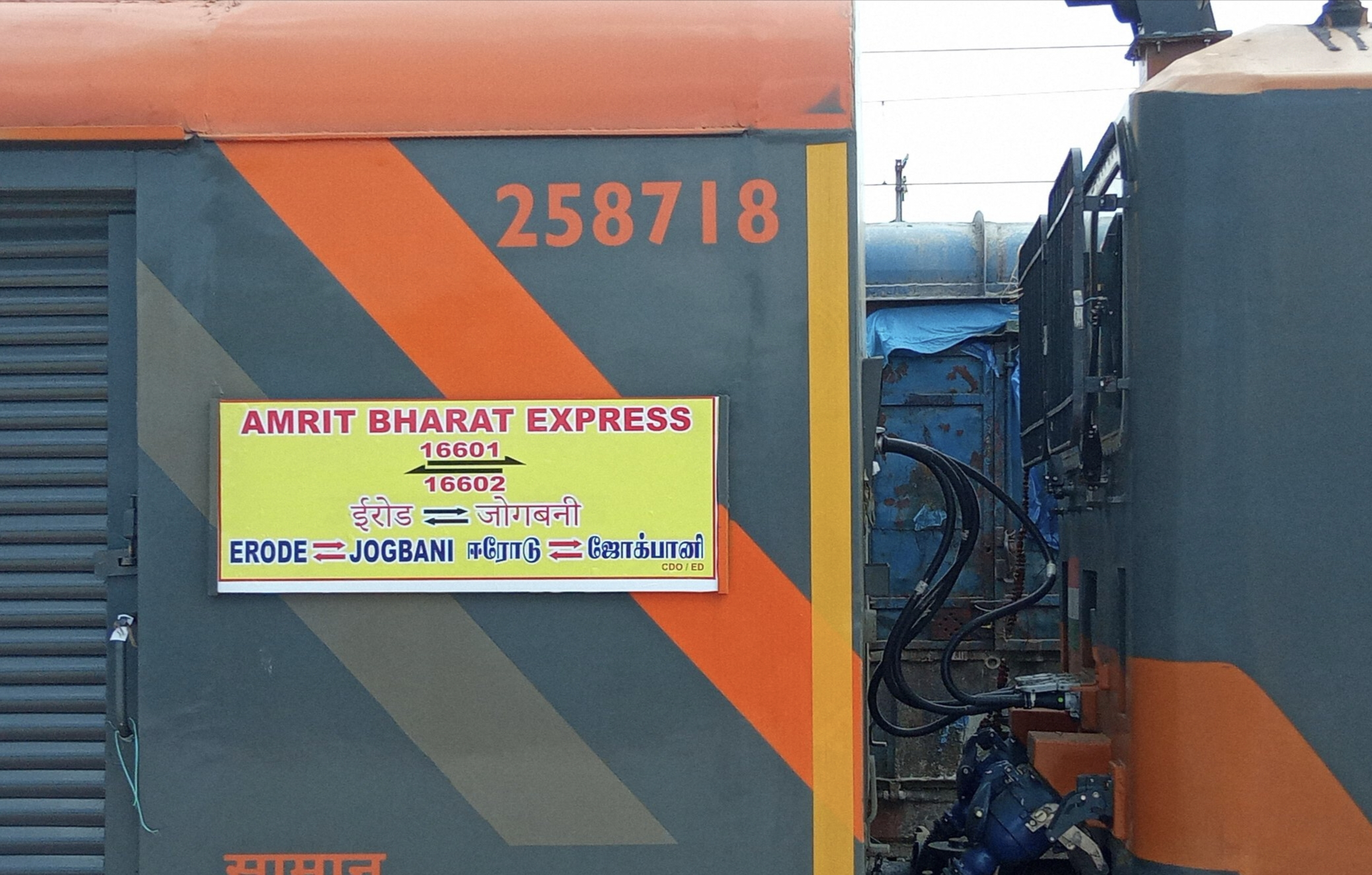

Overview
- Service type: Amrit Bharat Express, Superfast
- Status: Active
- Locale: Bihar, Uttar Pradesh, Madhya Pradesh, Maharashtra, Telangana, Andhra Pradesh & Tamil Nadu
- First service: 15 September 2025; 10 months ago (Inaugural) 25 September 2025; 10 months ago (Commercial)
- Current operator: Southern Railways (SR)

Route
- Termini: Erode Junction (ED); Jogbani (JBN)
- Stops: 50
- Distance travelled: 3,129 km (1,944 mi)
- Average journey time: 58h 50m
- Service frequency: Weekly
- Train number: 16601 / 16602
- Lines used: Erode–Jolarpettai–Arakkonam line; Arakkonam–Gudur line; Khammam–Warangal–Balharshah line; Balharshah–Nagpur line; Nagpur–Jabalpur line; Katni–Manikpur–Prayagraj Chheoki line; Prayagraj Chheoki–Pt. Deen Dayal Upadhyaya line; Pt. Deen Dayal Upadhyaya–Ara line; Danapur–Hajipur line; Barauni–Khagaria–Katihar line; Katihar–Jogbani line

On-board services
- Class: Sleeper class (SL) General Unreserved (GS)
- Seating arrangements: Yes
- Sleeping arrangements: Yes
- Auto-rack arrangements: Upper
- Catering facilities: On-board catering
- Observation facilities: Saffron-grey
- Entertainment facilities: Electric outlets; Reading lights; Bottle holder
- Other facilities: CCTV cameras; Bio-vacuum toilets; Foot-operated water taps; Passenger information system

Technical
- Rolling stock: Modified LHB coach
- Track gauge: Indian gauge
- Electrification: 25 kV 50 Hz AC Overhead line
- Operating speed: 51 km (32 mi) (Avg.)
- Track owner: Indian Railways
- Rake sharing: No

The 16601/16602 Erode–Jogbani Amrit Bharat Express is India's 10th Non-AC Superfast Amrit Bharat Express train, which runs across the states of Tamil Nadu, Andhra Pradesh, Maharashtra, Madhya Pradesh, Uttar Pradesh & Bihar connecting Erode Junction and Jogbani via Perambur (Chennai), Nagpur Junction, Prayagraj Junction, and Patna Jn.

This express train was inaugurated on 15 September 2025 by Honorable Prime Minister Narendra Modi via video conference.

This train is the longest running Amrit Bharat Express covering a total distance of 3129 kilometres.

== Overview ==
The train is operated by Indian Railways, connecting Erode Junction and Jogbani. It is currently operated with train numbers 16601/16602 on Bi-weekly services.

== Rakes ==
It is the 10th Amrit Bharat 2.0 Express train in which the locomotives were designed by Chittaranjan Locomotive Works (CLW) at Chittaranjan, West Bengal and the coaches were designed and manufactured by the Integral Coach Factory at Perambur, Chennai under the Make in India initiative.

== Schedule ==
Train schedule: Erode ↔ Jogbani Amrit Bharat Express
Train no.	Station code	Departure station	Departure time	Departure day	Arrival station	Arrival time	Hours covered
16601	ED	Erode Junction	8:10 AM	Thursday	Jogbani	7:00 PM	58h 50m
16602	JBN	Jogbani	3:15 PM	Sunday	Erode Junction	7:20 AM	64h 5m

== Routes and halts ==
The halts for this Amrit Bharat Express will is given below:

1. Erode Junction (start)
2. Salem Junction
3. Jolarpettai Junction
4. Katpadi Junction
5. Arakkonam Junction
6. Perambur
7. Nayudupeta
8. Gudur Junction
9. Ongole
10. Vijayawada Junction
11. Khammam
12. Warangal
13. Manchiryal
14. Balharshah
15. Chandrapur
16. Sewagram Junction
17. Nagpur Junction
18. Betul
19. Ghoradongri
20. Itarsi Junction
21. Pipariya
22. Gadarwara
23. Jabalpur Junction
24. Katni Junction
25. Maihar
26. Satna Junction
27. Manikpur Junction
28. Dabhaura
29. Jasra
30. Prayagraj Chheoki Junction
31. Vindhyachal
32. Chunar Junction
33. Pt. Deen Dayal Upadhyaya Jn.
34. Buxar
35. Raghunathpur
36. Ara Junction
37. Danapur
38. Patliputra Junction
39. Sonpur Junction
40. Hajipur Junction
41. Shahpur Patori
42. Barauni Junction
43. Begusarai
44. Khagaria Junction
45. Mansi
46. Naugachia
47. Katihar Junction
48. Purnea Junction
49. Arariya Court
50. Forbesganj Junction
51. Jogbani (end)

== See also ==
- Amrit Bharat Express
- Vande Bharat Express
- Tejas Express
- Gatimaan Express
- Jogbani railway station
- Erode railway station
