= Jogbani–Danapur Vande Bharat Express =

Mini Vande Bharat Express train route in India

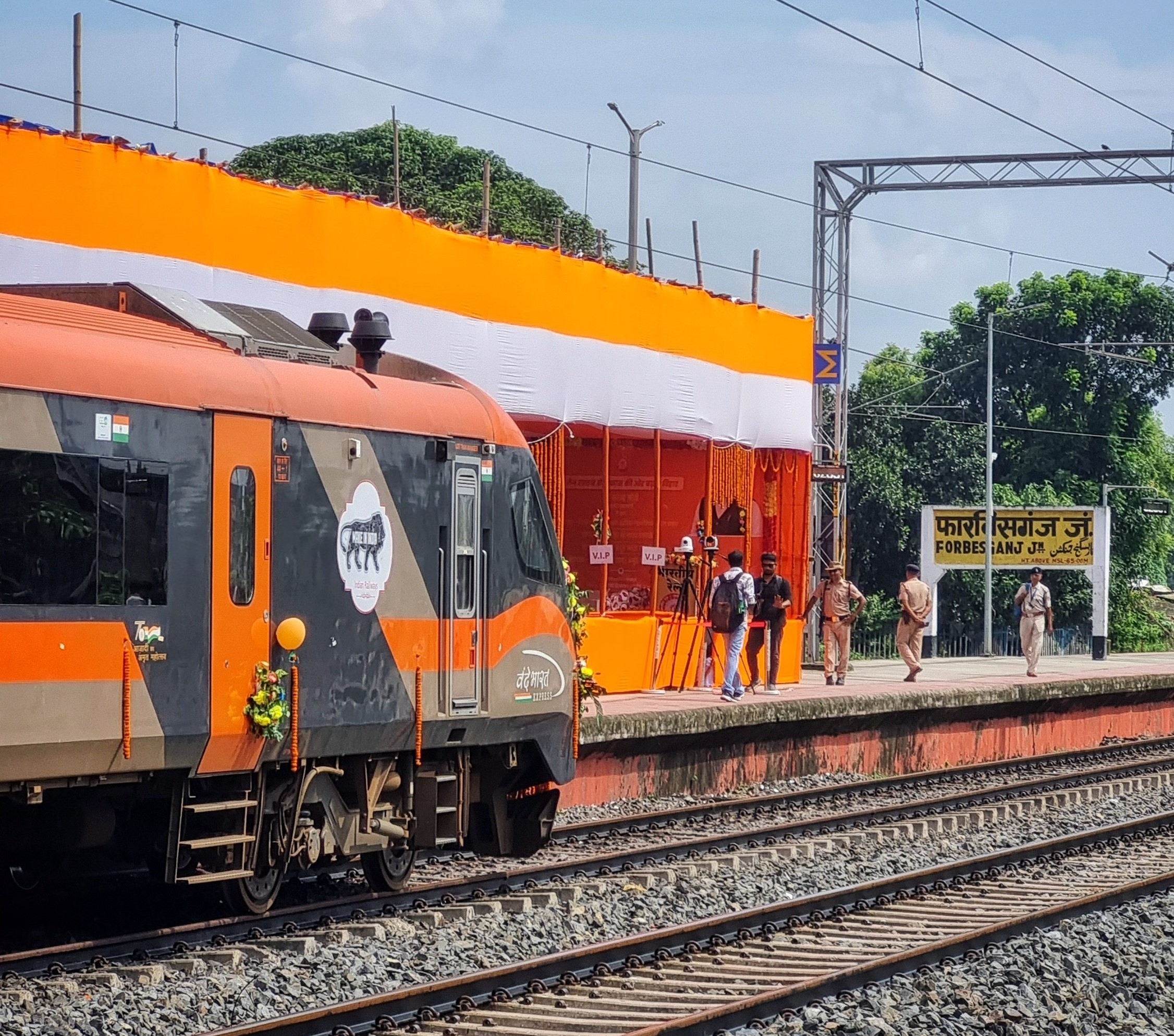
- Jogbani–Danapur Vande Bharat Express at Forbesganj

Overview
- Service type: Vande Bharat Express
- Locale: Bihar
- First service: September 15, 2025 (Inaugural); September 18, 2025; 13 months ago (Commercial)
- Current operator: ECR

Route
- Termini: Danapur (DNR); Jogbani (JBN)
- Stops: 12
- Distance travelled: 448.7 km (279 mi)
- Average journey time: 8 hrs 05 min
- Service frequency: Six days a week
- Train number: 26301 / 26302

On-board services
- Classes: AC Chair Car, AC Executive Chair Car
- Seating arrangements: Airline style; Rotatable seats
- Sleeping arrangements: No
- Catering facilities: On-board catering
- Observation facilities: Large windows in all coaches
- Entertainment facilities: On-board WiFi; Infotainment system; Electric outlets; Reading light; Seat pockets; Bottle holder; Tray table
- Baggage facilities: Overhead racks
- Other facilities: Kavach

Technical
- Rolling stock: Mini Vande Bharat 2.0
- Track gauge: Indian gauge
- Electrification: 25 kV 50 Hz AC overhead line
- Operating speed: 56 km/h (35 mph) (Avg.)
- Average length: 192 metres (630 ft) (08 coaches)
- Track owner: Indian Railways
- Rake maintenance: Danapur Coaching Complex (Patna)

The 26301/26302 Jogbani - Danapur (Patna) Vande Bharat Express is India's 74th Vande Bharat Express train, connecting two city of Bihar Patna & Jogbani via Purnia, Saharsa, Samastipur, Muzaffarpur & Hajipur.

This express train was inaugurated on 15 September 2025 by Prime Minister Narendra Modi via video conferencing from New Delhi.

== Overview ==
This express train is operated by Indian Railways, connecting Jogbani, Forbesganj Jn, Arariya Court, Purnea Junction, Banmankhi Junction, Dauram Madhepura, Saharsa Junction, Khagaria Junction, Salauna, Hasanpur Road Jn, Samastipur Junction, Muzaffarpur Junction, Hajipur Junction and Danapur. It is currently operated with train numbers 26301/26302 on 6 days a week basis.

== Rakes ==
It is the seventy-fourth 2nd Generation and forty-one Mini Vande Bharat 2.0 Express train which was designed and manufactured by the Integral Coach Factory at Perambur, Chennai under the Make in India initiative.

== Schedule ==
26301 / 26302 Jogbani–Danapur Vande Bharat Express schedule
Train type	Vande Bharat Express
Distance	451 km
Average speed	55 km/h
Journey time (Jogbani → Danapur)	8 hrs 10 min
Journey time (Danapur → Jogbani)	8 hrs 10 min
Number of Sstops	14
Classes available	Chair Car (CC)
Operating days (26301)	Monday, Tuesday, Thursday, Friday, Saturday, Sunday
Operating days (26302)	Monday, Wednesday, Thursday, Friday, Saturday, Sunday
Train numbers	26301 (JBN → DNR) / 26302 (DNR → JBN)
Terminal stations	Jogbani – Danapur
Operator	East Central Railway (ECR)

== Route and halts ==
Jogbani–Danapur–Jogbani Vande Bharat Express Time Table
26301 JBN–DNR				26302 DNR–JBN			
Station	Day	Arr.	Dep.	Station	Day	Arr.	Dep.
Jogbani	1	—	03:30	Danapur	1	—	17:10
Forbesganj Junction	1	03:35	03:37	Hajipur Junction	1	18:03	18:05
Arariya Court Junction	1	04:00	04:02	Muzaffarpur Junction	1	18:45	18:50
Purnia Junction (Reversal)	1	04:30	04:40	Samastipur Junction	1	19:38	19:40
Banmankhi Junction	1	05:12	05:14	Hasanpur Road	1	20:18	20:20
Dauram Madhpura	1	05:43	05:45	Salauna	1	20:36	20:38
Saharsa Junction (Reversal)	1	06:10	06:20	Khagaria Junction	1	21:10	21:12
Khagaria Junction	1	07:25	07:27	Saharsa Junction (Reversal)	1	22:00	22:10
Salauna	1	07:49	07:51	Dauram Madhpura	1	22:39	22:41
Hasanpur Road	1	08:04	08:06	Banmankhi Junction	1	23:08	23:10
Samastipur Junction	1	08:40	08:42	Purnia Junction (Reversal)	1	23:40	23:50
Muzaffarpur Junction	1	09:40	09:45	Arariya Court Junction	2	00:18	00:20
Hajipur Junction	1	10:31	10:33	Forbesganj Junction	2	00:48	00:50
Danapur	1	11:40	—	Jogbani	2	01:20	—

== Coach composition and maintenance ==
Coach Composition and Maintenance Details
Coach Type	Number of Coaches
Executive Chair Car (EC)	1
Chair Car (CC)	7
Other Details
Primary Maintenance	Danapur Coaching Depot
Watering Points	Saharsa Junction, Muzaffarpur Junction and Jogbani

== See also ==
- Vande Bharat Express
- Tejas Express
- Gatimaan Express
- Patna Junction railway station
- Jogbani railway station
- Muzaffarpur Junction railway station
