= Forbesganj (disambiguation) =

Forbesganj is a neighbourhood in Forbesganj, Bihar, India.

Forbesganj may also refer to:

- Forbesganj town
- Forbesganj (community development block)
- Forbesganj subdivision
- Forbesganj (Vidhan Sabha constituency)
- Forbesganj Airport
- Forbesganj police firing
