= Saharsa–Purnia line =

Railway line in India

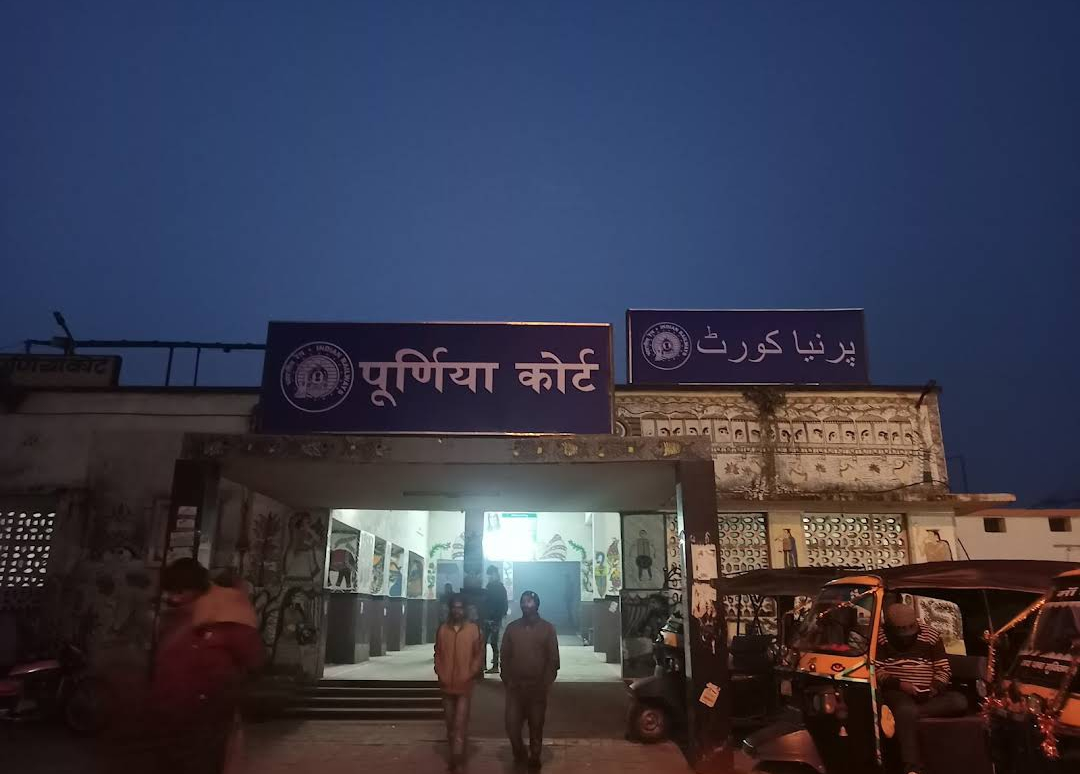
- Purnia Court railway station is an important railway station on Saharsa–Purnia line

Overview
- Status: Operational
- Owner: Indian Railways
- Locale: Bihar, India
- Termini: Saharsa Junction; Purnia Junction
- Stations: 16

Service
- Type: Single electric line
- Operator: East Central Railway zone

History
- Opened: 1954; 72 years ago

Technical
- Line length: 99 km (62 mi)
- Number of tracks: 1
- Track gauge: 1,676 mm (5 ft 6 in)
- Electrification: Yes
- Operating speed: 100 km/h (62 mph)

Saharsa–Purnia line is a single 5 ft 6 in (1,676 mm) broad-gauge track from Saharsa Junction to Purnia Junction of Bihar state. The line connects Saharsa to the Mini Darjeeling of Bihar Purnia. The Saharsa–Purnia Court section falls under Samastipur Division of East Central Railway and Purnia Court–Purnia Junction section under Katihar Division of Northeast Frontier Railway.

== History ==
The construction of the Purnea–Banmankhi–Murliganj and Bihariganj line, built by the East Bengal Railway, began in 1929 and was completed in 1937, passing through this station.

After India's independence, the Saharsa–Budhmaghat line was extended to Murliganj in 1954, connecting the entire Purnea – Saharsa section with 1,000 mm (3 ft 3 3/8 in)-wide metre-gauge tracks.

The gauge conversion work on the Purnia–Saharsa line commenced in the year 2007–08, resulting in a partial suspension of train services. However, the unprecedented floods in the Kosi River in 2008 severely disrupted and delayed the project. After eight years of construction, the broad gauge (BG) line on the remaining Banmankhi–Purnia section was finally completed and inaugurated on June 10, 2016, by the then Railway Minister of India, Suresh Prabhu.

== Branch Line ==
=== Banmankhi–Bihariganj line ===
The Banmankhi–Bihariganj line is a broad-gauge railway line in Bihar, under the jurisdiction of the East Central Railway. The line spans approximately 27 km, connecting Banmankhi Junction (BNKI) in Purnia district to Bihariganj (BHGJ) in Madhepura district. The gauge conversion of this line was part of the Purnia–Saharsa line gauge conversion project. It was inaugurated in 2018, enhancing rail connectivity in the region. The line have primarily three passenger trains for Saharsa Junction and Purnia Court, facilitating transportation between rural and urban areas.

== Trains ==
- Kosi Express
- Janaki Intercity Express
- Hate Bazare Express
- Purnia Court–Amritsar Jan Sewa Express
- Janhit Express
- Saharsa–Purnia DEMU
- Saharsa–Bihariganj DEMU
- Saharsa–Purnia Court Fast Passenger
- Bihariganj–Purnia Court DEMU
- Saharsa–Dauram Madhepura MEMU

== See also ==
- Indian Railways
- Saharsa Junction
- Purnia Junction
- Purnia Court
- Banmankhi Junction
- Samastipur railway division
- Katihar railway division
- Kosi Division
- East Central Railway zone
- Northeast Frontier Railway zone
