= Barhara Kothi railway station =

Railway station in Purnea, Bihar, India

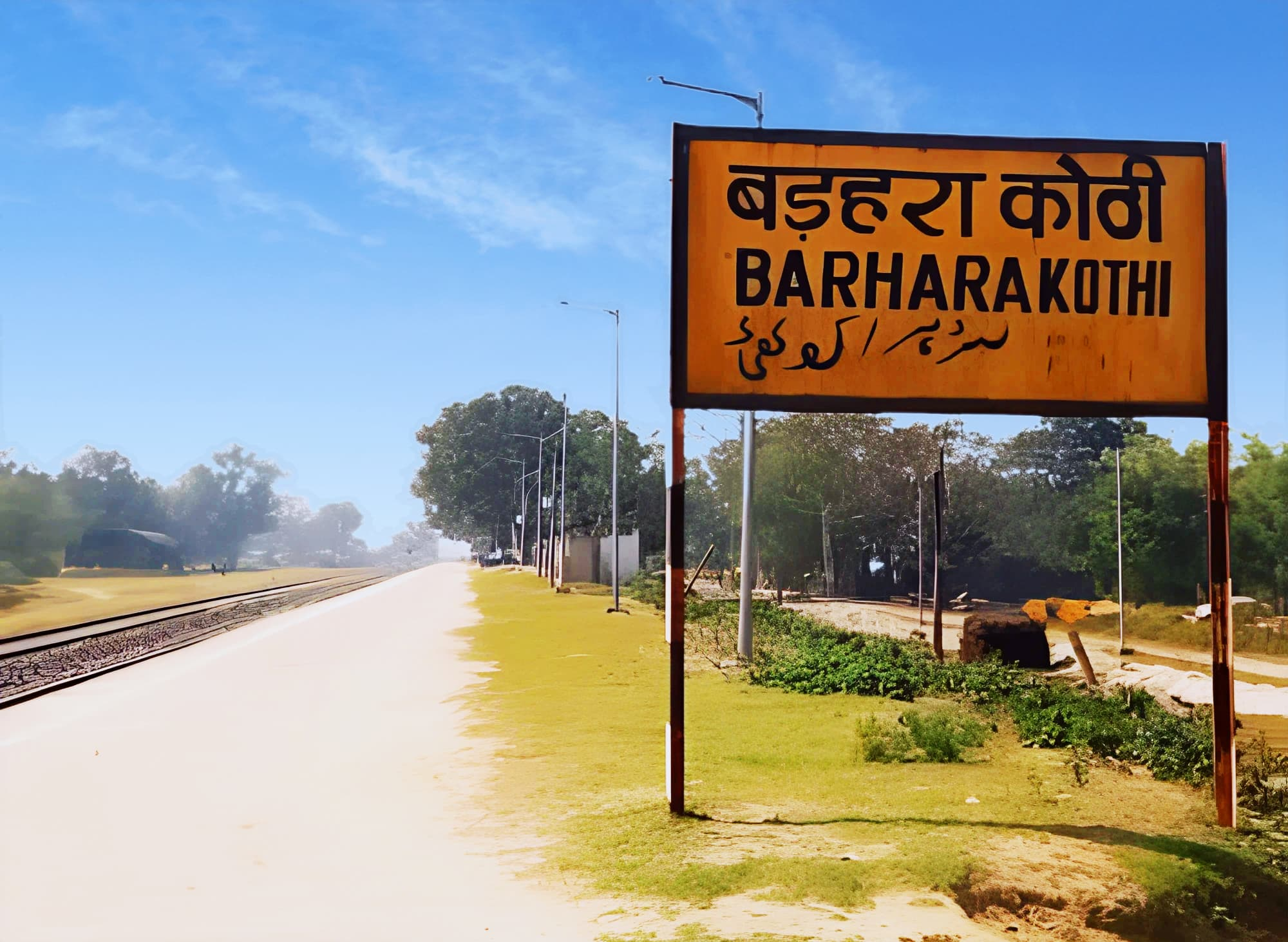
- Station Board

General information
- Location: Purnia district, Bihar; India
- Coordinates: 25.7769°N 87.0961°E
- Elevation: 45 metres (148 ft)
- System: Indian Railways station
- Owner: Indian Railways
- Operator: East Central Railway
- Line: Banmankhi–Bihariganj branch line
- Platforms: 1
- Tracks: 2
- Connections: Auto stand

Construction
- Structure type: Standard (on ground station)

Other information
- Status: Single diesel 5 ft 6 in (1,676 mm) broad gauge line
- Station code: BAKT
- Zone(s): East Central Railway
- Division(s): Samastipur railway division

Services
Preceding station	Indian Railways	Following station
Sukhshena towards Katihar Junction	Barauni–Katihar section Banmankhi–Bihariganj	Raghubans Nagar towards Barauni Junction
Location
- Location within India Location within Bihar

Barhara Kothi railway station is a small railway station on Banmankhi–Bihariganj branch line. It is located in Purnia district, Bihar, India. Its code is BAKT. It serves Barhara Kothi village. The station consists of one platform.

== Services ==
As of January 2020, there is one daily DEMU train connecting Barhara Kothi with Saharsa Junction:

Number	Train Name
75263 / 75264	Saharsa–Barhara Kothi DEMU

== Gauge conversion ==
In 2017, Banmankhi–Bihariganj branch line which initially was laid as metre-gauge railway, was closed for gauge conversion to 5 ft 6 in (1,676 mm) broad gauge. Two years later, in February 2019 was commissioned the first stretch of 16 km track between Banmankhi and Barhara Kothi. The remaining section between Barhara Kothi and Bihariganj (12 km) is expected to be completed by March 2020.

There is a project to extend the line after Bihariganj up to Kursela.
