= LKN =

LKN or lkn may refer to:

- LKN, the IATA code for Leknes Airport, Nordland county, Norway
- LKN, the ICAO code for NAM Air, Jakarta, Indonesia
- LKN, the Indian Railways station code for Lakhminia railway station, Bihar, India
- lkn, the ISO 639-3 code for Lakon language, Vanuatu
- Latin Kings (gang), a large Latino and Caribbean street and prison gang
