= Jogbani–Katihar line =

Railway line in India

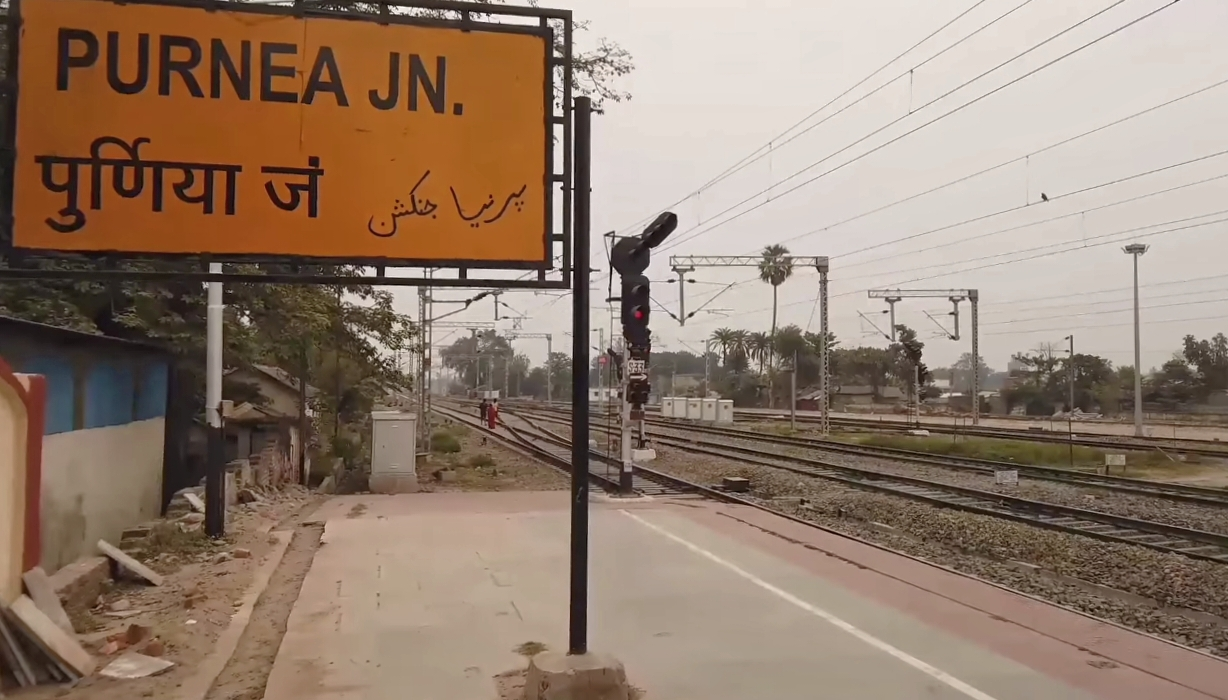
- Purnia Junction railway station is an important railway station on Jogbani–Katihar line

Overview
- Status: Operational
- Owner: Indian Railways
- Locale: Bihar, India
- Termini: Jogbani; Katihar Junction
- Stations: 19

Service
- Type: Single electric line
- Operator: Northeast Frontier Railway zone

History
- Opened: 1887; 139 years ago

Technical
- Line length: 108 km (67 mi)
- Number of tracks: 1
- Track gauge: 1,676 mm (5 ft 6 in)
- Electrification: Yes
- Operating speed: 110 km/h (68 mph)

Jogbani–Katihar line is a single 5 ft 6 in (1,676 mm) broad-gauge track from Jogbani to Katihar Junction of Bihar state. The line connects Jogbani, a vital trade hub near the Nepal border, to Katihar, a major railway junction that provides access to key routes across India. The whole line falls under Katihar Division of Northeast Frontier Railway.

== History ==
The metre-gauge line between Katihar and Jogbani was constructed in three stages between 1887 and 1909. The East Indian Railway built the Manihari–Katihar–Kasba section in 1887, which was later extended up to Jogbani by the East Bengal Railway in 1909. The gauge conversion of this 108 km-long line was sanctioned in 2001, and the work was completed in 2008. The first broad-gauge service from Jogbani to Katihar commenced on 4 June 2008.

== Major trains ==
- Jogbani–Anand Vihar Seemanchal Express
- Kolkata–Jogbani Express
- Jogbani–Siliguri Town Intercity Express
- Jogbani–Danapur Intercity Express
- Jogbani–Raxaul Express
- Jogbani -Saharsa Express
- Janaki Intercity Express
- Hate Bazare Express
- Jogbani Katihar DEMU

== See also ==
- Indian Railways
- Jogbani
- Katihar Junction
- Purnia Junction railway station
- Katihar railway division
- Purnia Division
- Northeast Frontier Railway zone
