= Banmankhi Junction railway station =

Railway station in Bihar, India

BANMANKHI JUNCTION
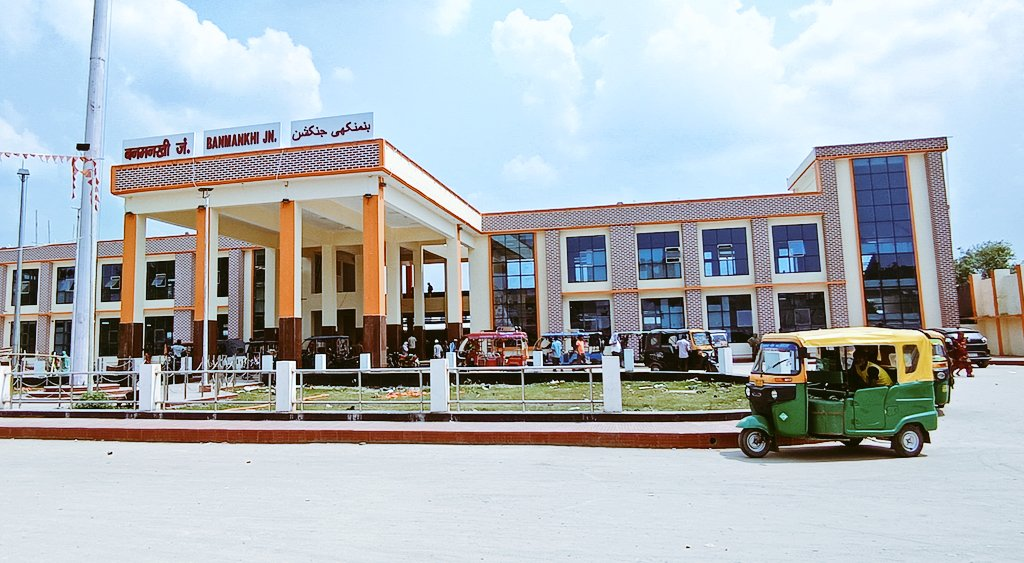
- New constructed building of Banmankhi Junction.

General information
- Location: Station Road, Banmankhi, Bihar; India
- Coordinates: 25.885013°N 87.193268°E
- Elevation: 46 metres (151 ft)
- System: Indian Railways junction station
- Owner: Indian Railways
- Operator: East Central Railways
- Lines: Saharsa–Purnia line; Banmankhi–Bihariganj branch line
- Platforms: 3
- Tracks: 4

Construction
- Structure type: Standard (on ground station)
- Parking: Yes
- Accessible: Available

Other information
- Status: Functioning
- Station code: BNKI
- Zone(s): East Central Railway zone
- Division(s): Samastipur

History
- Opened: 1940; 86 years ago
- Electrified: 2022; 4 years ago
- Former names: East Indian Railways
Route map
Location
- Location within Bihar Location within India

Banmankhi Junction railway station (station code:- BNKI), is the railway station serving the town of Banmankhi in the Purnea district in the Indian state of Bihar. It is a NSG-4 category railway station of Samastipur railway division in East Central Railway.

== History ==
Banmankhi Junction railway station was opened in 1937, becoming the second junction railway station in Purnea district, Bihar, British India. The construction of the Purnea - Banmankhi - Murliganj and Bihariganj section, built by the East Bengal Railway, began in 1929 and was completed in 1937, passing through this station.

After India’s independence, the Saharsa - Budhmaghat line was extended to Murliganj in 1954, connecting the entire Purnea - Saharsa section with 1,000 mm (3 ft 3 3/8 in)-wide metre-gauge tracks.

The gauge conversion work on the Purnia - Saharsa section commenced in the year 2007-08, resulting in a partial suspension of train services. However, the unprecedented floods in the Kosi River in 2008 severely disrupted and delayed the project. After eight years of construction, the broad gauge (BG) line on the remaining Banmankhi - Purnia section was finally completed and inaugurated on June 10, 2016, by the then Railway Minister of India, Suresh Prabhu.

== Facilities ==
The major facilities available are waiting rooms, retiring room, computerised reservation facility, reservation counter, vehicle parking etc. The vehicles are allowed to enter the station premises. There are refreshment rooms vegetarian and non-vegetarian, tea stall, book stall, post and telegraphic office and Government Railway police (G.R.P.) office.

There are 3 platforms in Banmankhi Junction. The platforms are interconnected with only one foot overbridge (FOB).

== Trains ==
Route of Jansewa Express

- 14617/14618 Purnia Court–Amritsar Jan Sewa Express

Route:- Purnia Court, Banmankhi Junction, Saharsa Junction, Khagaria Junction, Begusarai, Barauni Junction, Hajipur, Sonpur, Chhapra Junction, Siwan Junction, Gorakhpur Junction, Gonda Junction, Sitapur, Bareilly, Moradabad, Laksar Junction, Saharanpur, Ambala Cantonment, Ludhiana, Jalandhar City, Amritsar

Route of Kosi Express

- 18626/18625 Kosi Express

Route:- Purnia Court, Banmankhi Junction, Saharsa Junction, Khagaria Junction, Begusarai, Mokama, Bakhtiyarpur Junction, Patna Junction, Jehanabad, Gaya Junction, Koderma, Gomoh Junction, Bokaro Steel City, Muri Junction, Ranchi, Hatia

Route of Janhit Express

- 13205/13206 Janhit Express

Route :- Purnia Court, Banmankhi Junction, Saharsa Junction, Khagaria Junction, Begusarai, Barauni Junction, Hajipur, Patliputra

Route of Janki Express

- 15283/15284 Janaki Intercity Express

Route:- Manihari, Katihar, Purnia, Purnia Court, Banmankhi Junction, Saharsa Junction, Khagaria Junction, Rusera Ghat, Samastipur, Darbhanga, Madhubani, Jaynagar

Route of Hate Bazare Express (Via Purnia)

- 13169/13170 Hate Bazare Express (via Purnea)

Route:- Saharsa Junction, Purnea, Katihar, Malda Town, Azimganj, Katwa and Sealdah
