= Forbesganj police firing =

Police firing in Forbesganj

2011 Forbesganj police firing
- Location: Forbesganj, Bihar, India
- Date: 3 June 2011
- Deaths: 4
- Injuries: 32

The Forbesganj police firing was a violent clash between a mob and Bihar Police outside an underconstruction factory, where four people were killed and 27 policemen and five villagers were injured near Forbesganj, a town in Bihar, India, on 3 June 2011.

== Background ==
Bhajanpur villagers agitated for a road passage through the factory site beginning in December 2010. After negotiations with factory officials, an alternate route was agreed on.

On 3 June 2011, a violent mob attacked the factory, demolishing one of its wall and committing arson. Police tried to control them with a baton charge, but when they grew more violent, shots were fired, killing two. Two more people later died in hospital from injuries sustained during the violence.

Bihar Chief minister Nitish Kumar announced a judicial probe into the firing.

== Political reactions ==
Sharad Yadav

JD(U) National President Sharad Yadav disapproved of the judicial probe saying decision to order a judicial probe into Forbesganj police firing incident may discourage private investment in Bihar and deter the industrialists from setting up their units in the state.

Ram Vilas Paswan

Lok Jantantrik Party chief Ram Vilas Paswan asked for resignation of Nitish Kumar: "Nitish should own moral responsibility for the police firing and also the killing of a doctor in Gopalganj jail,"

Rashtriya Janata Dal

The judicial probe should also inquire into the role of deputy chief minister SK Modi, BJP MLC Ashok Agarwal and Forbesganj SDO Giriwar Dayal Singh, leader of the opposition in the state assembly Abdul Bari Siddiqui told reporters.

== Actions ==
Bihar government

Bihar government announced a judicial probe but no judge has been named as of June 21. A compensation of 3 lakhs was announced to the parents of infant Sahil Ansari. No compensation is announced for other victims.

Police Jawan Sunil Kumar Yadav, who jumped on one of the victims, was arrested and charged with murder.

Bihar Human Rights Commission (BHRC)

"Taking suo moto cognisance of the Forbesganj police firing that claimed four lives on June 3, Bihar Human Rights Commission (BHRC) has asked for a probe. The commission directed the commissioner and IG of Purnia to ensure a joint probe and submit a report within next four weeks."

Indian American Muslim Council (IAMC)

Indian American Muslim Council issued an action alert on 22 June 2011 asking people to call Bihar Chief Minister to demand strong action in this case.

== See also ==
- List of cases of police brutality in India
