= Purnia Court railway station =

Railway station in Purnea, Bihar, India

PURNIA COURT

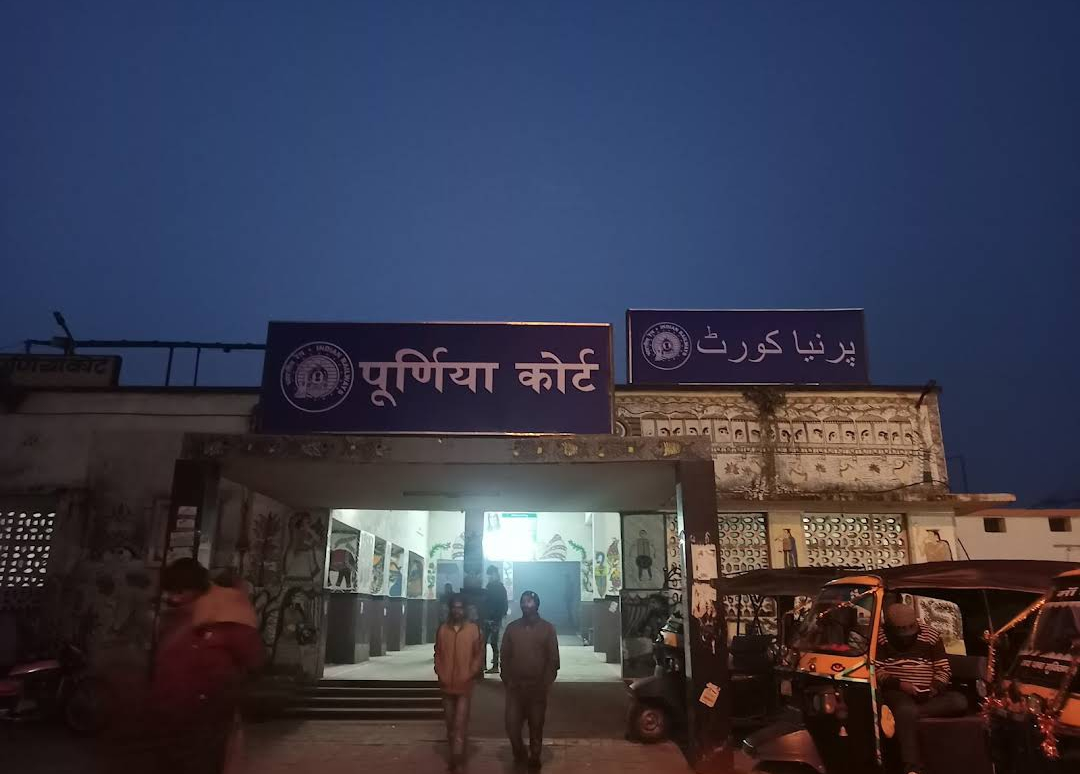
- Purnia Court Railway Station; Purnia Court

General information
- Location: Kosi Colony, Korathbadi Road, Purnia, Bihar; India
- Coordinates: 25.795128°N 87.475022°E
- Elevation: 40 metres (130 ft)
- System: Urban Railway Station
- Owner: Indian Railways
- Operator: East Central Railways
- Line: Saharsa–Purnia line
- Platforms: 3
- Tracks: 4

Construction
- Structure type: Standard (on ground station)
- Parking: Yes
- Accessible: Available

Other information
- Status: Functioning
- Station code: PRNC
- Zone(s): East Central Railway zone
- Division(s): Samastipur

History
- Opened: 1940; 86 years ago
- Electrified: 2022; 4 years ago
- Former names: East Indian Railways

Passengers
- 50000/day
Services
Preceding station	Indian Railways	Following station
East Central Railway
Banmankhi Junction towards Katihar Junction	Barauni–Katihar section	Purnia towards Barauni Junction
Route map
Location
- Location within India Location within Bihar
- Interactive map of Purnea Court

Purnia Court railway station (station code: PRNC), is a railway station serving the city of Purnea, Purnia district of the Indian state of Bihar. This station is managed by the East Central Railway under the Samastipur railway division. Earlier it was an MG line which has now been converted to standard BG line and lies on the Purnea–Banmankhi–Saharsa section. The BG line was inaugurated by the Railway Minister of India Suresh Prabhu on 10 June 2016.

== History ==
Purnia Court railway station was opened in 1937, becoming the second railway station in Purnea, Bihar, British India. The construction of the Purnea - Banmankhi - Murliganj and Bihariganj section, built by the East Bengal Railway, began in 1929 and was completed in 1937, passing through this station. Purnia Court got its name due to its proximity to the District Court, which is located around 5 km away.

After India’s independence, the Saharsa - Budhmaghat line was extended to Murliganj in 1954, connecting the entire Purnea - Saharsa section with 1,000 mm (3 ft 3 3/8 in)-wide metre-gauge tracks.

The gauge conversion work on the Purnia - Saharsa section commenced in the year 2007-08, resulting in a partial suspension of train services. However, the unprecedented floods in the Kosi River in 2008 severely disrupted and delayed the project. After eight years of construction, the broad gauge (BG) line on the remaining Banmankhi - Purnia section was finally completed and inaugurated on June 10, 2016, by the then Railway Minister of India, Suresh Prabhu.

== Platforms ==
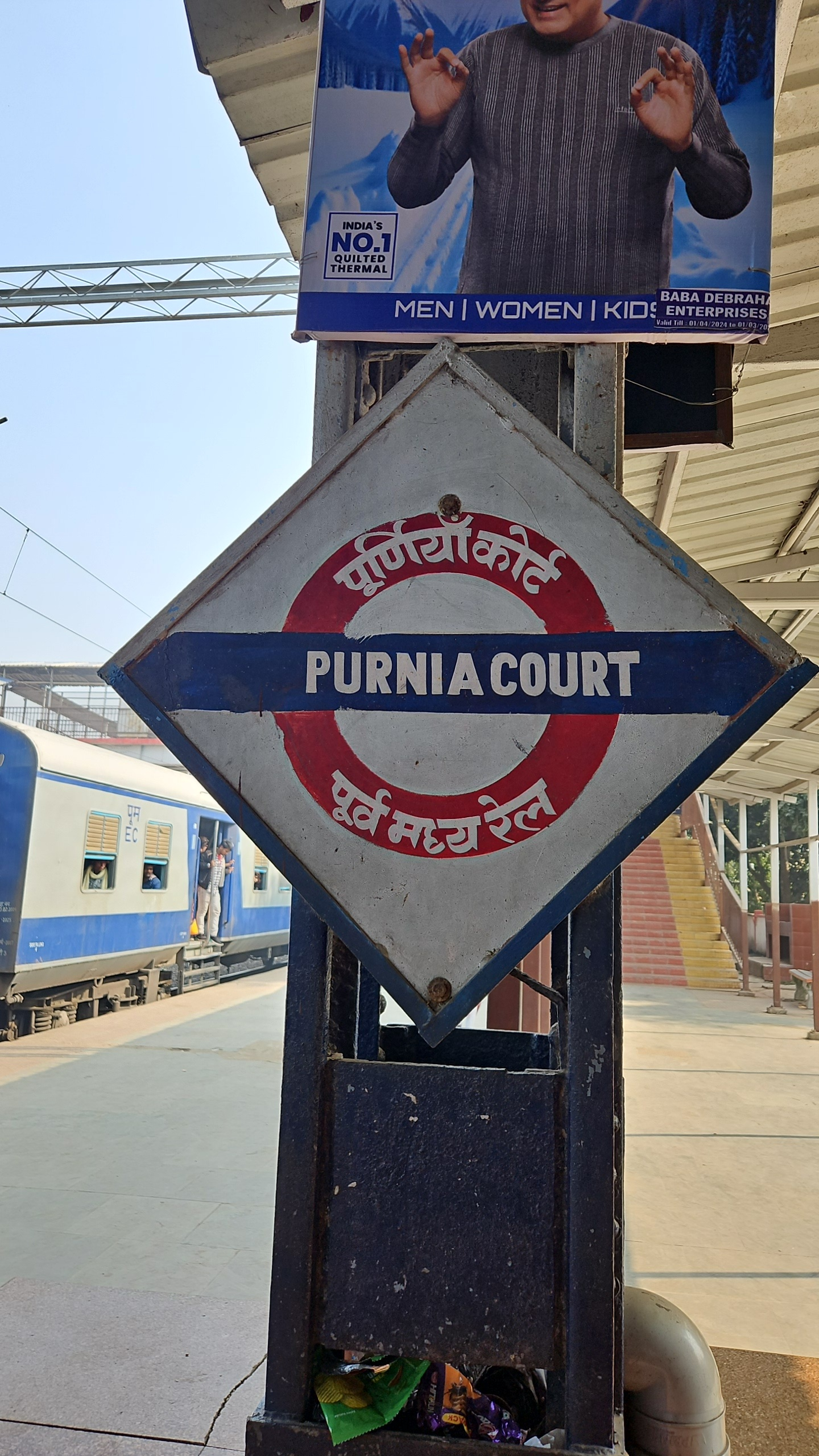
Station Board

This station has three platforms and one foot overbridge with ramp.

== Trains ==
About 17 trains halt, originate and terminate at Purnia Court daily, including express, DEMU, and passenger services.

=== Mail/Express ===
- Janaki Intercity Express (15283/15284) – Jaynagar ↔ Katihar ↔ Manihari
- Kosi Express (18625/18626) – Purnia Court ↔ Hatia
- Purnia Court-Amritsar Jan Sewa Express (14617/14618) – Purnia Court ↔ Amritsar
- Janhit Express (13205/13206) – Purnia Court ↔ Patliputra

=== Local/Passenger ===
- Purnea–Saharsa DEMU (75257/75258)
- Purnea–Saharsa DEMU (75259/75260)
- Purnea–Saharsa DEMU (75261/75262)
- Purnia Court–Saharsa DEMU (75225/75226)
- Purnia Court–Saharsa Fast Passenger (55569/55570)
- Purnia Court–Bihariganj DEMU (75264/75265)
- Purnia Court–Bihariganj DEMU (75223/75224)
