= Lakhminia =

- Village
- Location within India
- Coordinates: 25.411027711784666°N 86.32458131767704°E
- Country: India
- State: Bihar
- District: Begusarai District
- Time zone: India Standard Time
- Postal Code: 851211
- Area code: 06344

Lakhminia is a village in Begusarai district in the Indian state of Bihar. The village is home to the Lakhminia railway station.
