= Deotala railway station =

Railway station in West Bengal, India

Deotala

General information
- Location: Deotala, West Bengal; India
- Coordinates: 25.2746°N 88.2941°E
- Elevation: 36 metres (118 ft)
- System: Indian Railways station
- Owner: Indian Railways
- Line: Eklakhi–Balurghat branch line
- Platforms: 1
- Tracks: 1

Construction
- Structure type: Standard (on ground station)
- Parking: Available

Other information
- Status: Functioning
- Station code: DOTL
- Zone(s): Northeast Frontier Railway
- Division(s): Katihar railway division
- Website: http://www.indianrail.gov.in

History
- Opened: 2004
- Electrified: Ongoing

Services
Preceding station	Indian Railways	Following station
Daulatpur Halt towards ?	Northeast Frontier Railway Eklakhi–Balurghat branch line	Mahanagar towards ?
Location
- Location within West Bengal Location within India

Deotala railway station is located in Malda district in the Indian state of West Bengal. It serves Deotala village and the surrounding areas. Deotala station was built in 2004. A few trains, like the Gour Express, Malda Town–Balurghat passenger trains stop at Deotala railway station.
