= Seemanchal Express =

Train in India

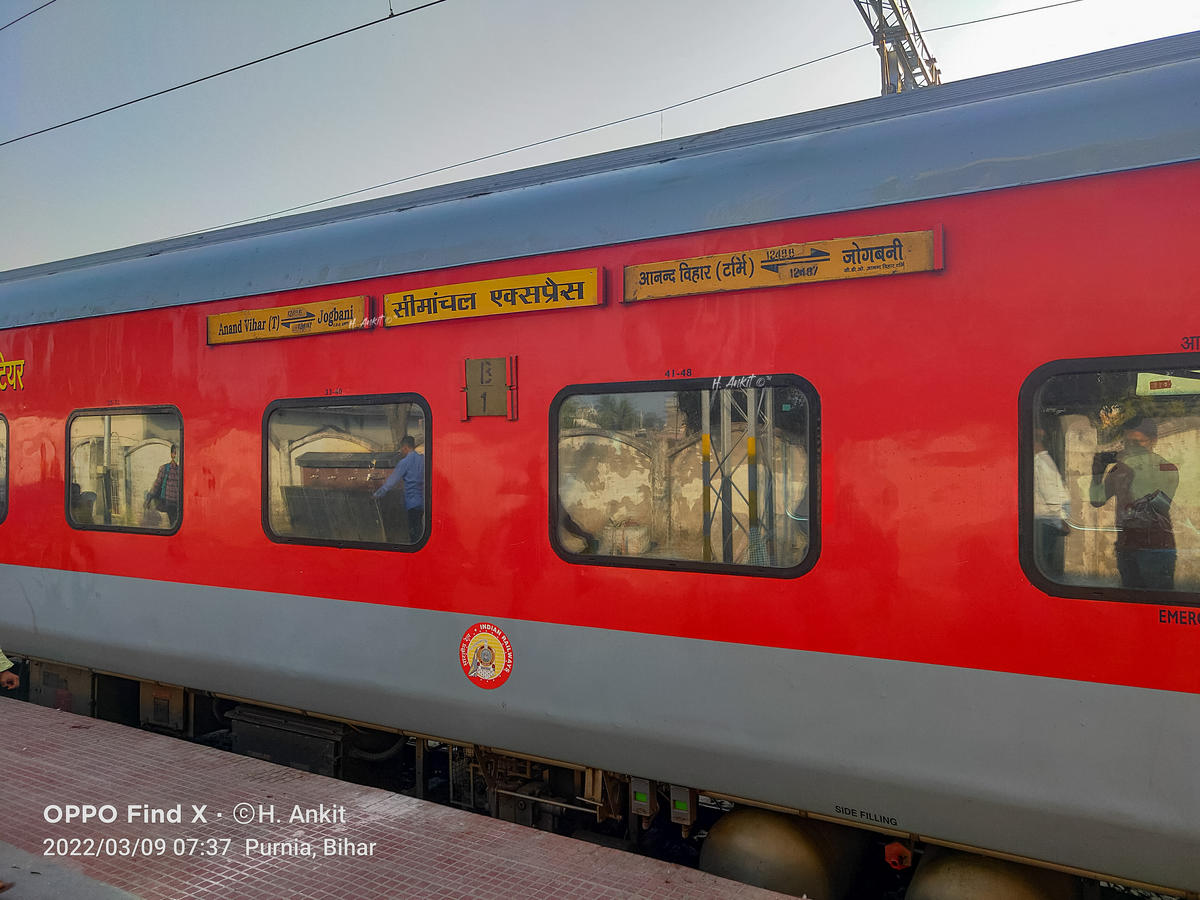
- B1 AC coach of Seemanchal Express.

Overview
- Service type: Superfast Express
- First service: 5 January 2009; 17 years ago
- Current operator: Northern Railway

Route
- Termini: Jogbani (JBN); Anand Vihar Terminal (ANVT)
- Stops: 33
- Distance travelled: 1,380 km (857 mi)
- Average journey time: 24 hrs 05 mins
- Service frequency: Daily
- Train number: 12487 / 12488

On-board services
- Classes: AC 2 Tier, AC 3 Tier, AC 3 Tier Economy, Sleeper Class, General Unreserved
- Seating arrangements: No
- Sleeping arrangements: Yes
- Catering facilities: Available
- Observation facilities: Large windows
- Baggage facilities: No
- Other facilities: Below the seats

Technical
- Rolling stock: LHB coach
- Track gauge: 1,676 mm (5 ft 6 in)
- Operating speed: 57 km/h (35 mph) average including halts.

The 12487 / 12488 Seemanchal Express is a superfast express train belonging to Northern Railway zone that runs between Jogbani and Anand Vihar Terminal in India. It is currently being operated with 12487/12488 train numbers on a daily basis.

== Service ==
The 12487/Seemanchal Express has an average speed of 57 km/h and covers 1397 km in 24h 05m. The 12488/Seemanchal Express has an average speed of 59 km/h and covers 1397 km in 23h 40m.

== Route and halts ==
The important halts of the train are:

Station Code	Station Name	Distance (km)
JBN	Jogbani	0
FBG	Forbesganj Junction	13.2
ARR	Araria	42
PRNA	Purnia Junction	80.2
KIR	Katihar Junction	108.2
NNA	Naugachia	166.8
KGG	Khagaria Junction	233.8
BGS	Begusarai	273.9
BJU	Barauni Junction	289.2
PPTA	Patliputra Junction	397.4
DNR	Danapur	403.3
DLN	Dildarnagar Junction	547.3
DDU	Pt. Deen Dayal Upadhyaya Junction	605.0
MZP	Mirzapur	668.2
PRYJ	Prayagraj Junction	757.6
CNB	Kanpur Central	952.1
TDL	Tundla Junction	1183.2
ALJN	Aligarh Junction	1261.5
GZB	Ghaziabad Junction	1367.5
ANVT	Anand Vihar Terminal	1380.1

== Coach composition ==
The train has modern LHB rakes with a maximum speed of 130 km/h. The train consists of 22 coaches:

- 2 Second Tier AC
- 4 Third Tier AC
- 2 Third Tier AC Economy
- 7 Sleeper Class
- 5 General Unreserved
- 1 Seating cum Luggage Rake
- 1 EOGs

== Traction ==
Both trains are hauled by a Ghaziabad Loco Shed-based WAP-5 / WAP-7 electric locomotive from Jogbani to Anand Vihar Terminal and vice versa.

== Incident ==
On February 3, 2019, at 3:58 a.m IST, the Delhi-bound Seemanchal Express train derailed at Hajipur in Bihar. This led to the derailment of one general coach, one A.C three tier coach, three sleeper coaches and four more coaches. At least six people died and several people were injured. Later the East Central railway officials found that it was caused due to a rail fracture.

== See also ==
- Jogbani railway station
- Anand Vihar Terminal railway station
- Kolkata–Jogbani Express
