= Hate Bazare Express (via Purnea) =

Express train in India

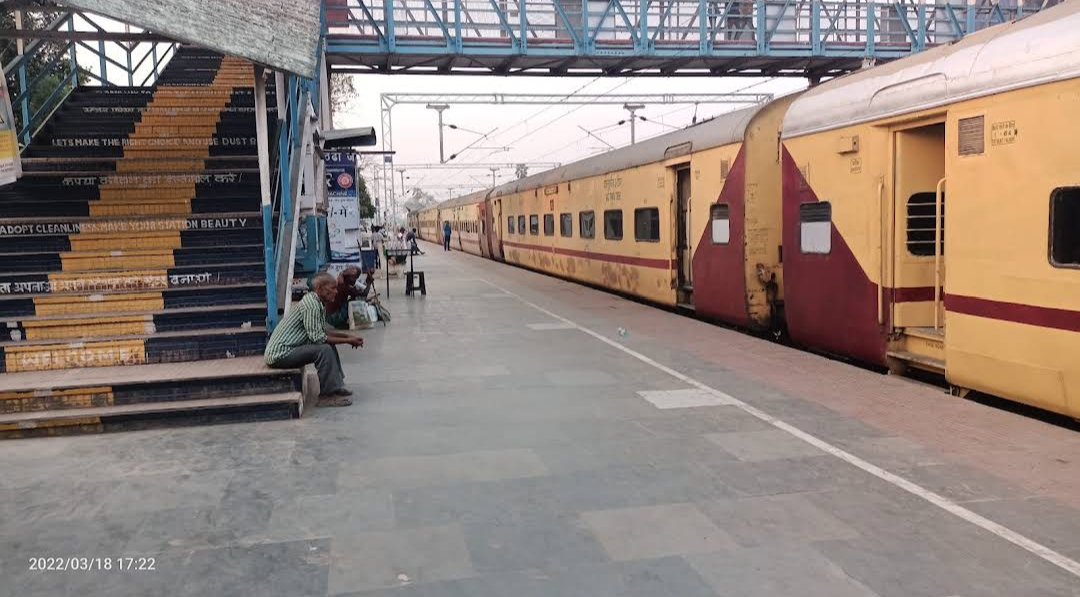
- Hate Bazare Express is standing at Purnia

Overview
- Service type: Express
- First service: 5 December 2017; 8 years ago
- Current operator: Eastern Railway

Route
- Termini: Sealdah; Saharsa Junction
- Stops: 26
- Distance travelled: 564 km (350 mi)
- Average journey time: 14 hours 55 minutes
- Service frequency: Tuesaday & Thursday
- Train number: 13169 / 13170

On-board services
- Classes: AC 2 tier, AC 3 tier, Sleeper, General
- Seating arrangements: Yes
- Catering facilities: Yes ( E - catering available at some stations)

Technical
- Rolling stock: ICF coach
- Track gauge: 1,676 mm (5 ft 6 in)
- Operating speed: 38 km/h (24 mph)

Hate Bazare Express (via Purnea) is an Express train belonging to Eastern Railway zone of Indian Railways that run between Sealdah and Saharsa Junction in India. The name of the train is derived from the Bengali word Hate Bazare which means The Market place in English and also its a name of the novel wrote by Balai Chand Mukhopadhyay (Banaphool).

== Coaches ==
13169/70 Hare Bazare Express (via Purnea) runs with 19 LHB Coaches in the following composition:

- 1 AC II Tier (2A)
- 4 AC III Tier (3A)
- 8 Sleeper (SL)
- 4 General Unreserved (UR)
- 2 Seating cum Luggage (SLR)

Hate Bazare Express (via Purnea) is run with two rake and is maintained at the Narkeldanga Coaching Yard, located at Sealdah.

As is customary with most train services in India, coach composition may be amended at the discretion of Indian Railways depending on demand.

== Service ==
The 13169 Sealdah - Saharsa Junction Hate Bazare Express (via Purnea) covers the distance of 564 km (350 mi) in 14 hours 55 minutes (38 km/h) and in 14 hours 25 mins as the 13170 Saharsa Junction - Sealdah Hate Bazare Express (via Purnea) (39 km/h).

As the average speed of the train is lower than 55 km/h (34 mph), as per railway rules, its fare doesn't includes a Superfast surcharge.

== Route and halts ==
The important halts of the train are:

Station Code	Station Name	Distance (km)
SDAH	Sealdah	0
NH	Naihati Junction	41
BDC	Bandel Junction	50
ABKA	Ambika Kalna	92
NDAE	Nabadwip Dham	116
KWAE	Katwa Junction	155
SALE	Salar	172
KGLE	Khagraghat Road	213
AZ	Azimganj Junction	228
JRLE	Jangipur Road	310
NILE	Nimtita	283
NFK	New Farakka Junction	310
MLDT	Malda Town	345
OMLF	Old Malda Junction	351
EKI	Eklakhi Junction	364
SM	Samsi	380
BKRD	Bhaluka Road	390
HCR	Harischandrapur	400
KDPR	Kumedpur Junction	406
KIR	Katihar Junction	436
PRNA	Purnea Junction	464
BNKI	Banmankhi Junction	500
DMH	Dauram Madhepura	542
SHC	Saharsa Junction	564

== Traction ==
As the entire route is fully electrified, a Sealdah,-based WAP-7 locomotive powers the train for its entire journey.
