= Patna–Hatia Super Express =

Patna - Hatia Super Express
Overview
- Service type: Express
- Status: This train merged with Kosi Super Express.
- Current operator: South Eastern Railway zone

Route
- Termini: Patna Junction (PNBE); Hatia (HTE)
- Stops: 18
- Distance travelled: 414 km (257 mi)
- Average journey time: 9h 20m
- Service frequency: Daily (Note: Runs seven day in a week for every direction.)
- Train number: 18625/18626

On-board services
- Classes: AC 2 tier, AC 3 tier, Sleeper Class, General Unreserved
- Seating arrangements: No
- Sleeping arrangements: Yes
- Catering facilities: On-board Catering; E-Catering
- Observation facilities: ICF coach
- Entertainment facilities: No
- Baggage facilities: No
- Other facilities: Below the seats

Technical
- Rolling stock: 2
- Track gauge: 1,676 mm (5 ft 6 in)
- Operating speed: 44 km/h (27 mph), including halts

The Patna - Hatia Super Express was an express train belonging to South Eastern Railway zone that runs between Patna Junction and Hatia in India. It was currently being operated with 18625/18626 train numbers on daily basis. Now this is merged with Kosi Express.

== See also ==
- Patna Junction railway station
- Hatia railway station
- Patna - Hatia Patliputra Express
- Patna - Hatia Super Express
- Kosi Express
