= Forbesganj Airport =

- IATA: none; ICAO: none

Summary
- Airport type: Public
- Operator: Airports Authority of India
- Location: Forbesganj, Bihar, India
- Elevation AMSL: 204.4 ft / 62 m
- Coordinates: 26°17′48.5″N 087°17′2.52″E

Map
- Airport in India Forbesganj Airport (India)

Runways
Direction	Length		Surface
Direction	ft	m	Surface
09/27			Unpaved

Forbesganj Airport is a non operational airport located at Araria District in the state of Bihar, India maintained by the AAI.

== History ==
Historically Forbesganj had a functional military airport between 1934 and 1942 (active during World War II) and again during the 1962 war with China. On 10 June 1973 a Royal Nepal Airlines DHC-6 Twin Otter Plane was hijacked en route to Kathmandu from Biratnagar. This airport has now fallen into disrepair and is not operational.

== Transport ==
The nearest active airport to Forbesganj is Biratnagar (Nepal). Closest domestic airports are Darbhanga Airport in Darbhanga, Bihar and Bagdogra Airport in Siliguri, West Bengal, both about 160 km away. Jay Prakash Narayan International Airport in the Bihar state's capital city Patna is approximately 300 km. away. From Bagdogra Airport it takes 3–4 hours to reach the city by road.

== Specifications ==
The airport has been built on a 53 acres land area, located 5 km from the city.

The airport is located at an elevation of 193 feet (59 m) above mean sea level. It has one paved runway designated 09/27 oriented by measures of dimension 5000 ft x 500 ft with asphalt surface.

The airport was declared non operational by the Airports Authority of India.
