= Janhit Express =

Train in India

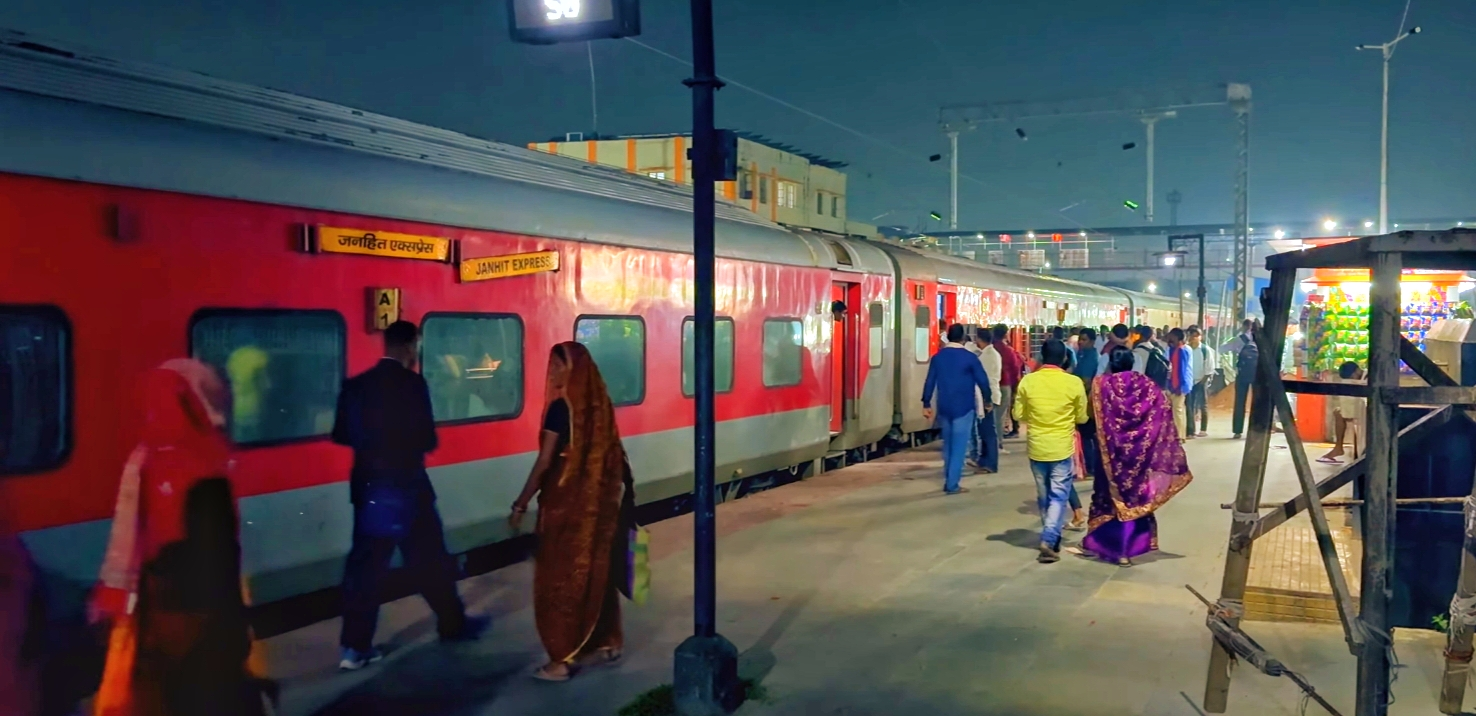
- Janhit Express At Saharsa Junction

Overview
- Service type: Express
- First service: 22 June 2016; 10 years ago (Inaugural run); 12 March 2024; 2 years ago (extended upto Purnia Court)
- Current operator: East Central Railway

Route
- Termini: Patliputra Junction (PPTA); Purnia Court (PRNC)
- Stops: 13
- Distance travelled: 312 km (194 mi)
- Average journey time: 8 hours 25 mins
- Service frequency: 5 days a week. (Note: Runs a five days for every direction.)
- Train number: 13205 / 13206

On-board services
- Classes: AC 2 Tier, AC 3 Tier, AC 3 Tier Economy, Sleeper Class, General Unreserved
- Seating arrangements: No
- Sleeping arrangements: Yes
- Catering facilities: On-board catering, E-catering
- Observation facilities: Large windows
- Baggage facilities: No
- Other facilities: Below the seats

Technical
- Rolling stock: LHB coach
- Track gauge: 1,676 mm (5 ft 6 in)
- Operating speed: 41 km/h (25 mph) average including halts.

The 13205 / 13206 Janhit Express is an Express train belonging to East Central Railway zone that runs between Purnia Court and Patliputra in India. It is currently being operated with 13205/13206 train numbers on a daily basis.

== Service ==
The 13205/Janhit Express has an average speed of 30 km/h and covers 312 km in 8h 15m. The 13206/Janhit Express has an average speed of 40 km/h and covers 312 km in 8h 25m.

== Route and halts ==
The important halts of the train are:

- Purnia Court
- Banmankhi Junction
- Murliganj
- Dauram Madhepura
- Saharsa Junction
- Simri Bakhtiyarpur
- Mansi Junction
- Khagaria Junction
- Begusarai
- Barauni Junction
- Hajipur Junction
- Patliputra Junction

== Coach composition ==
The train has standard LHB rakes with max speed of 130 km/h. The train consists of 20 coaches:

- 1 AC II Tier
- 2 AC III Tier
- 1 AC III Tier Economy
- 8 Sleeper
- 4 General
- 2 Head-on Generation

== Traction ==
Both trains are hauled by a Gomoh Loco Shed or Samastipur Loco Shed-based WAP-7 electric locomotive on its entire journey.

== Rake sharing ==
The train has a single rake with Preventive Maintenance is done at Saharsa.

== See also ==
- Saharsa Junction railway station
- Danapur railway station
- Lokmanya Tilak Terminus–Guwahati Express (via Katihar)
- Mahananda Express
