= Jogbani =

- town
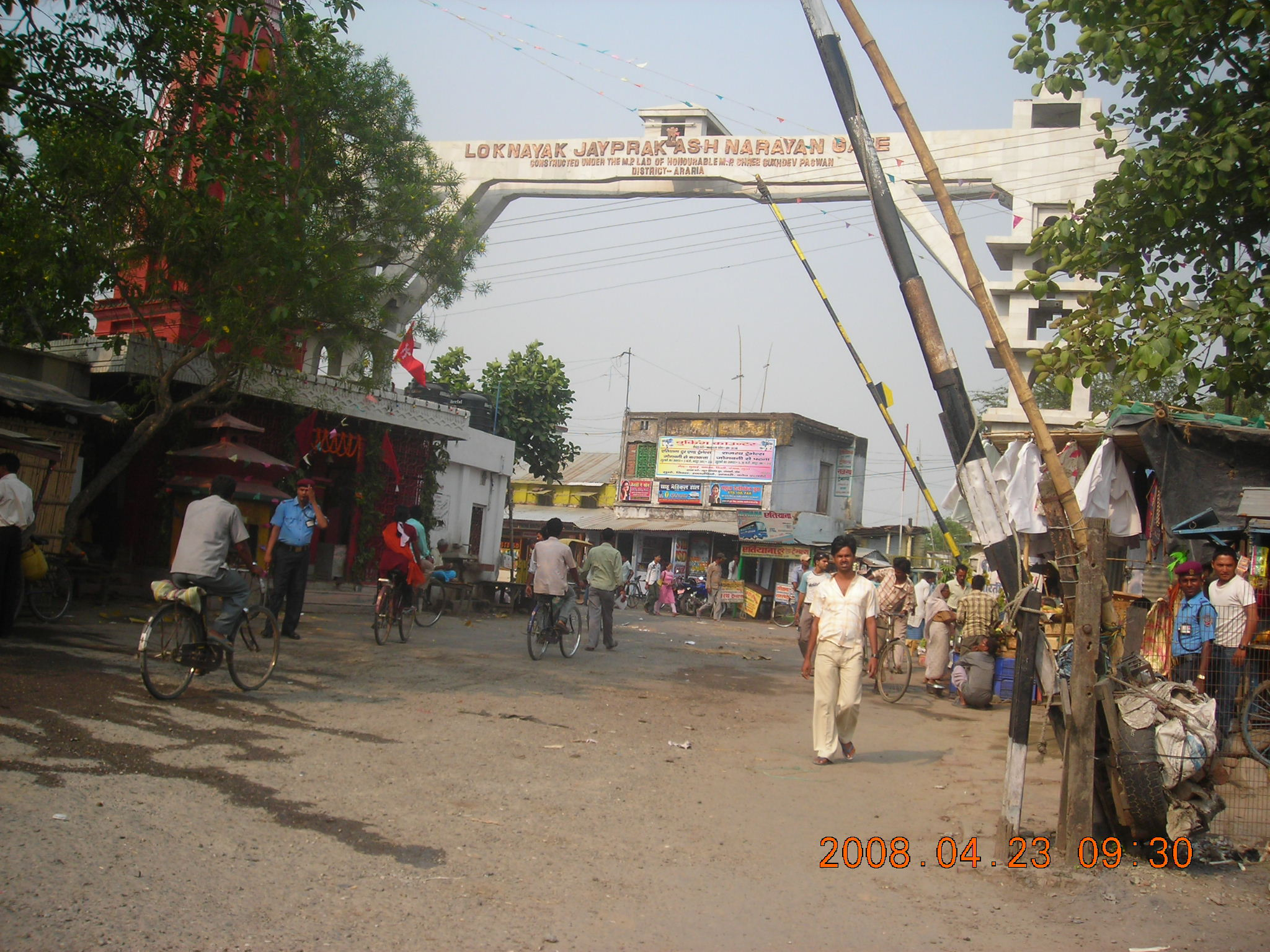
- Jayaprakash Narayan gate, Jogbani

- Location in Bihar, India Jogbani (India)
- Coordinates: 26°23′46″N 87°15′35″E
- Country: India
- State: Bihar
- Region: Mithila
- District: Araria

Government
  - Body: Nagar Parishad
- Elevation: 67 m (220 ft)

Population (2011)
  - Total: 39,281

Languages
  - Regional: Maithili
- Time zone: UTC+5:30 (IST)
- PIN: 854328
- Telephone code: 06455
- Lok Sabha constituency: Araria
- Vidhan Sabha constituency: Forbesganj

Jogbani is a municipal council area, in Araria District of Bihar state, India. It lies on the Indo-Nepal border with Morang District, Koshi Zone and is a gateway to Biratnagar city. There is a customs checkpoint for goods at the border.

== History ==
- First Mukhiya :- Late Sri Amilal Sah

== Education ==
=== Bihar board ===
- DS Memorial English Public School
- Mala Memorial English School
- Adarsh Shiksha Niketan
- DNP School
- Sarswati Vidhya Mandir
- High School Jogbani
- Rajkiya Madhya Vidhyalaya Jogbani
- Balika High School
- Saint Francisco English Boarding School
- Prathmik Vidyalay Khajur Bari
- Lila Public School

=== CBSE ===
- Radhakrishna Saraswati Vidyamandir
- Zenith Public School

== Public utilities ==
=== List of Banks ===
- State Bank of India
- Central Bank of India
- UCO Bank
- Punjab National Bank
- Uttar Bihar Gramin Bank

== Transport ==
Jogbani is the economical town of Bihar, situated in the eastern region, having a dense population of 39,281 since the 2011 census. Jogbani city is located near Forbesganj, in the northern part of Bihar.

=== Rail ===
Jogbani railway station is the last railway station of Barauni-Katihar, Saharsa and Purnia sections. Jogbani has a good connectivity to North India and East India. DEMU trains are available for Purnia and Katihar. Two express trains originate for Delhi and Kolkata. People of Biratnagar and other nearby region of Nepal take their train from here because of no railway in their locality. This district serves as a good connectivity for trade routes and public movement

=== Road ===
NH 527 starts from Jogbani that connects it to Forbesganj. Forbesganj is well connected to all part of India by NH 27. So, Jogbani has direct connectivity to Purnia, Katihar, Bhagalpur, Saharsa, Patna, Siliguri, Guwahati and Gorakhpur.

== See also ==
- List of railway stations in India
