= Lakhminia railway station =

Railway station in Bihar

Lakhminia Railway Station

General information
- Location: India
- Coordinates: 25.4260°N 86.3097°E
- System: Indian Railways station
- Owner: Indian Railway
- Operator: Indian Railway
- Platforms: 3

Construction
- Structure type: Standard (on-ground station)
- Parking: Yes

Other information
- Status: Functioning
- Station code: LKN
- Zone(s): East Central Railway
- Division(s): Sonpur

History
- Rebuilt: No
- Former names: East Indian Railway
Location

Lakhminia railway station (station code: LKN), is a railway station in the Sonpur division of East Central Railway Zone. It is situated in Lakhminia village, Begusarai district of the Indian state of Bihar. Begusarai is better known as the Industrial Capital of Bihar, the birthplace of noted person Thomas Edward Ravenshaw. 851211 is village postcode.
