= Purnea Junction railway station =

Railway station in Purnea, Bihar, India

PURNEA JUNCTION पूर्णिया जंक्शन

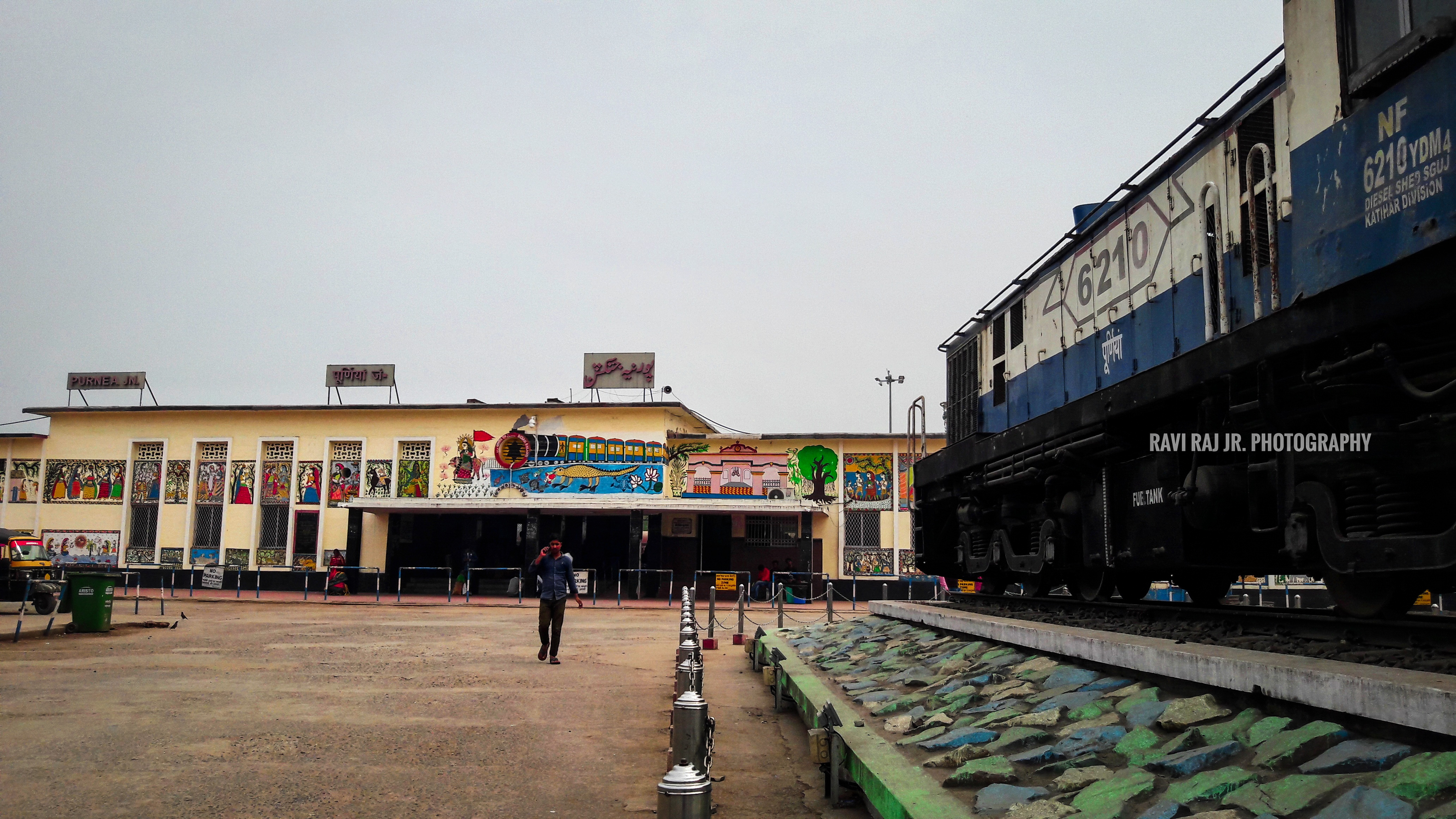
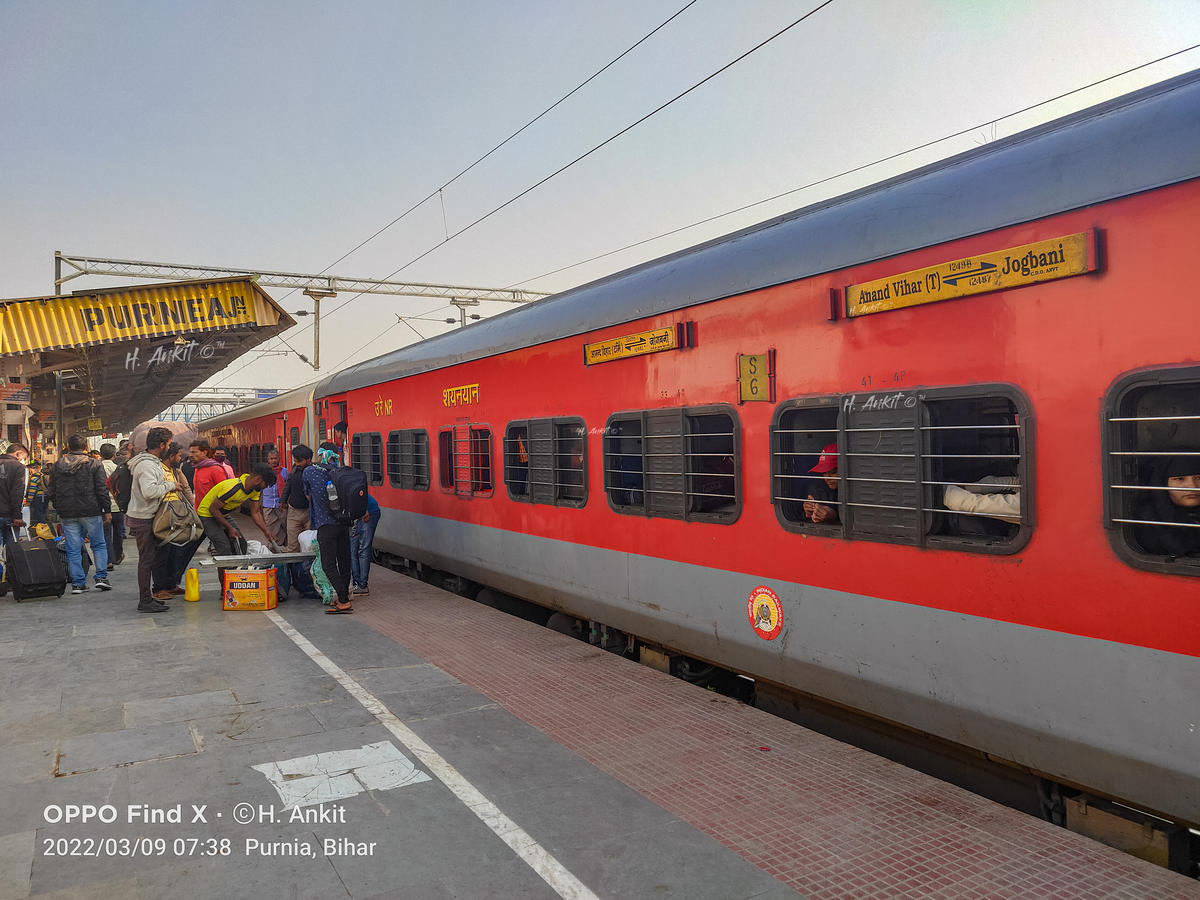
- Purnea Jn front Seemanchal Express at Purnea Junction.

General information
- Location: Purnea City Road, Khushkibagh, Purnea, Bihar-854305; India
- Coordinates: 25.7895°N 87.5190°E
- Elevation: 40 metres (130 ft)
- System: Indian Railways junction station
- Owner: Indian Railways
- Operator: Northeast Frontier Railways
- Lines: Jogbani–Katihar line; Saharsa–Purnia line
- Platforms: 3
- Tracks: 7
- Connections: Khushkibagh Auto Stand

Construction
- Structure type: At grade
- Parking: Available
- Accessible: Available

Other information
- Status: Functioning
- Station code: PRNA
- Zone(s): Northeast Frontier Railway zone
- Division(s): Katihar

History
- Opened: 1887; 139 years ago
- Electrified: 2022; 4 years ago
- Former names: Purnia City

Passengers
- 6756 average/day

Services
Preceding station	Indian Railways	Following station
Northeast Frontier Railway
Terminus	Barauni–Katihar section Towards Saharsa	Purnia Court towards Barauni Junction
Katihar towards Katihar Junction	Barauni–Katihar section Katihar–Jogbani branch line	Jogbani towards Barauni Junction

Other services
Location
- Location within Bihar Location within India
- Interactive map of Purnea Junction

Purnea Junction railway station (station code:- PRNA) is the railway station serving the city of Purnea in the Purnea district in the Indian state of Bihar. It is an A category railway station of Katihar railway division in Northeast Frontier Railway.

== History ==
Purnea Junction was opened in 1887, and the previous name of this station was Purnea City. This is situated on Jogbani–Katihar line of North East Frontier Railway (NFR). This railway line earlier was metre gauge. Another standard-gauge line of East Central Railway (ECR) connects Purnea with Saharsa Junction via Banmankhi. Conversion of the 36 km-long Purnea–Banmankhi stretch in Purnea–Madhepura-Saharsa section to broad gauge project is completed in 2016. There are daily and weekly trains to Sealdah, Malda Town, Delhi, Patna Junction, Darbhanga, Muzaffarpur Junction, Gorakhpur, Lucknow Charbagh, Siliguri Junction and other neighboring cities. There are many passenger trains available to Katihar, Saharsa Junction and Jogbani.

== Facilities ==
Purnea lies in between Katihar–Jogbani section. Purnea has trains running frequently to Delhi and Kolkata. Purnea is well connected with Katihar, Jogbani and Saharsa through daily passenger and express train services. Gauge Conversion of Katihar-Jogbani Section and Purnea-Saharsa Section was completed on 2009 and 2016 respectively.

The major facilities available are waiting rooms, retiring room, computerised reservation facility, reservation counter, vehicle parking etc. The vehicles are allowed to enter the station premises. There are refreshment rooms vegetarian and non-vegetarian, tea stall, book stall, post and telegraphic office and Government Railway police (G.R.P.) office.

There are 3 platforms in Purnea Junction. The platforms are interconnected with only one foot overbridge (FOB) with lifts. On 10 April 2018, a free Wi-Fi facility was started.

== Trains ==
About 31 trains halt, originate and terminate at Purnea Junction daily, including express, DEMU, and passenger services.

=== Mail/Express ===
- Seemanchal Express (12487/12488) – Jogbani ↔ Anand Vihar Terminal
- Erode–Jogbani Amrit Bharat Express (16601/16602) – Erode ↔ Jogbani
- Jogbani–Danapur Vande Bharat Express (26301/26302) – Jogbani ↔ Danapur
- Kolkata–Jogbani Express (13159/13160) – Jogbani ↔ Kolkata

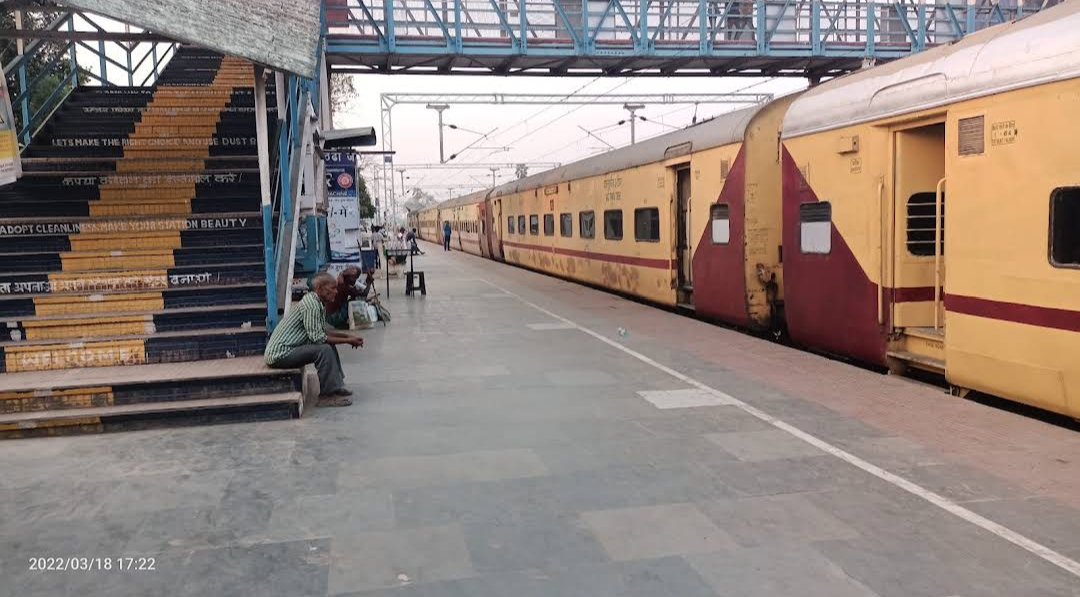
Hate Bazare Express at Purnia

- Hate Bazare Express (via Purnea) (13169/13170) – Saharsa Junction ↔ Purnia ↔ Sealdah
- Janaki Intercity Express (15283/15284) – Jaynagar ↔ Katihar ↔ Manihari
- Jogbani–Siliguri Town Intercity Express (15723/15724) – Jogbani ↔ Siliguri Town
- Katihar–Siliguri Intercity Express (via Purnea) (15701/15702) – Siliguri Junction ↔ Katihar

=== Local/Passenger ===
- Katihar–Jogbani DEMU (75745/75746)
- Katihar–Jogbani DEMU (75753/75754)
- Katihar–Jogbani DEMU (75755/75756)
- Katihar–Jogbani DEMU (75757/75758)
- Katihar–Jogbani DEMU (75759/75760)
- Katihar–Jogbani DEMU (75761/75762)
- Purnea–Saharsa DEMU (75257/75258)
- Purnea–Saharsa DEMU (75259/75260)
- Purnea–Saharsa DEMU (75261/75262)

== See also ==
- North Eastern Railway Connectivity Project
- North Western Railway zone
