= Purnia Court–Amritsar Jan Sewa Express =

Train in India

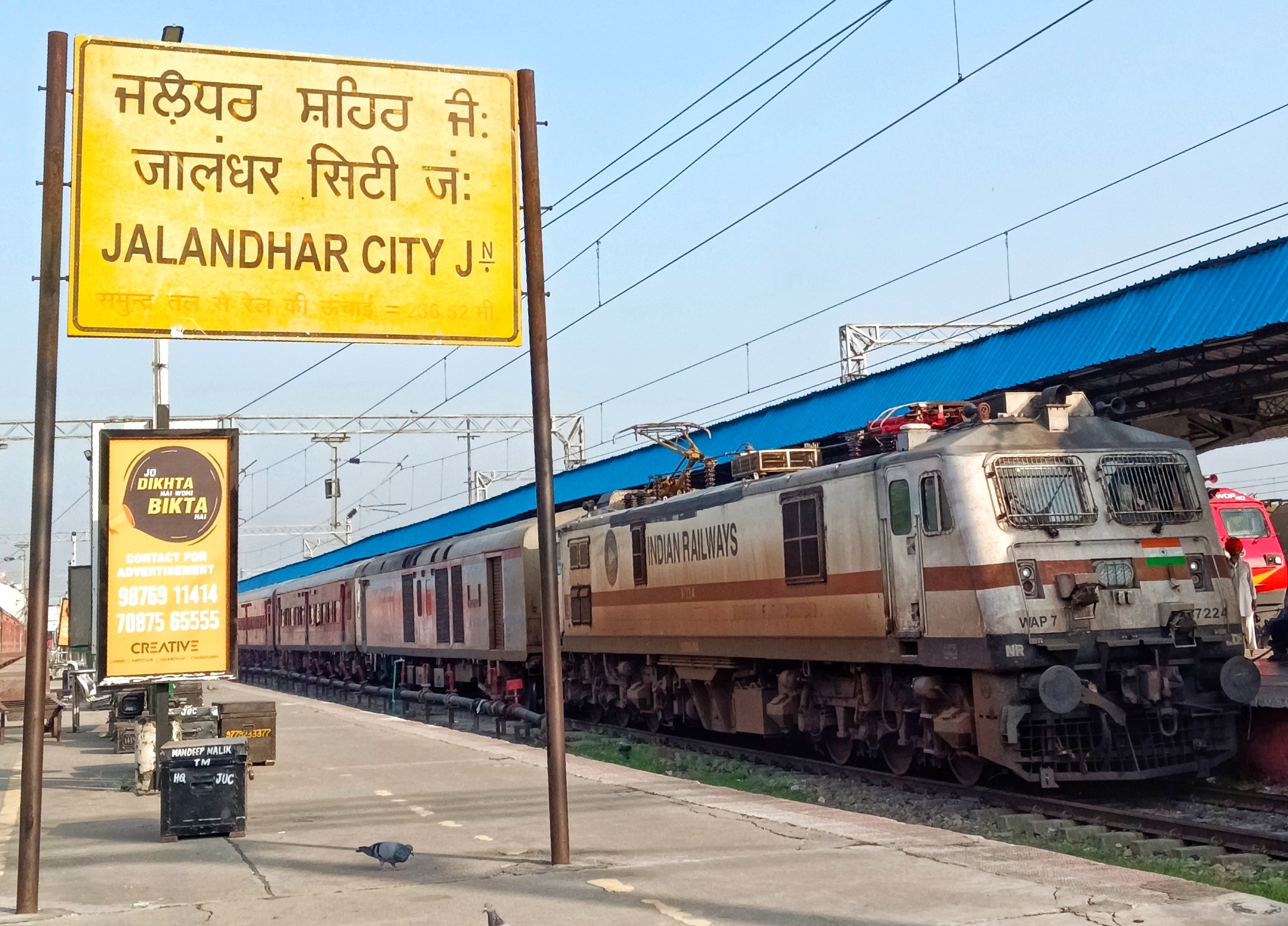
- Ludhiana WAP-7 hauling Jan Sewa Express At Jalandhar City Junction

Overview
- Service type: Express
- First service: 11 December 2009; 16 years ago
- Current operator: Northern Railway zone

Route
- Termini: Purnia Court; Amritsar Junction
- Stops: 51
- Distance travelled: 1,619 km (1,006 mi)
- Average journey time: 36 hours
- Service frequency: Daily
- Train number: 14617/ 14618

On-board services
- Class: general unreserved
- Seating arrangements: Yes
- Sleeping arrangements: Yes
- Catering facilities: No

Technical
- Rolling stock: Standard Indian Railways Coaches
- Track gauge: 1,676 mm (5 ft 6 in)
- Operating speed: 46 km/h (29 mph)
Route map
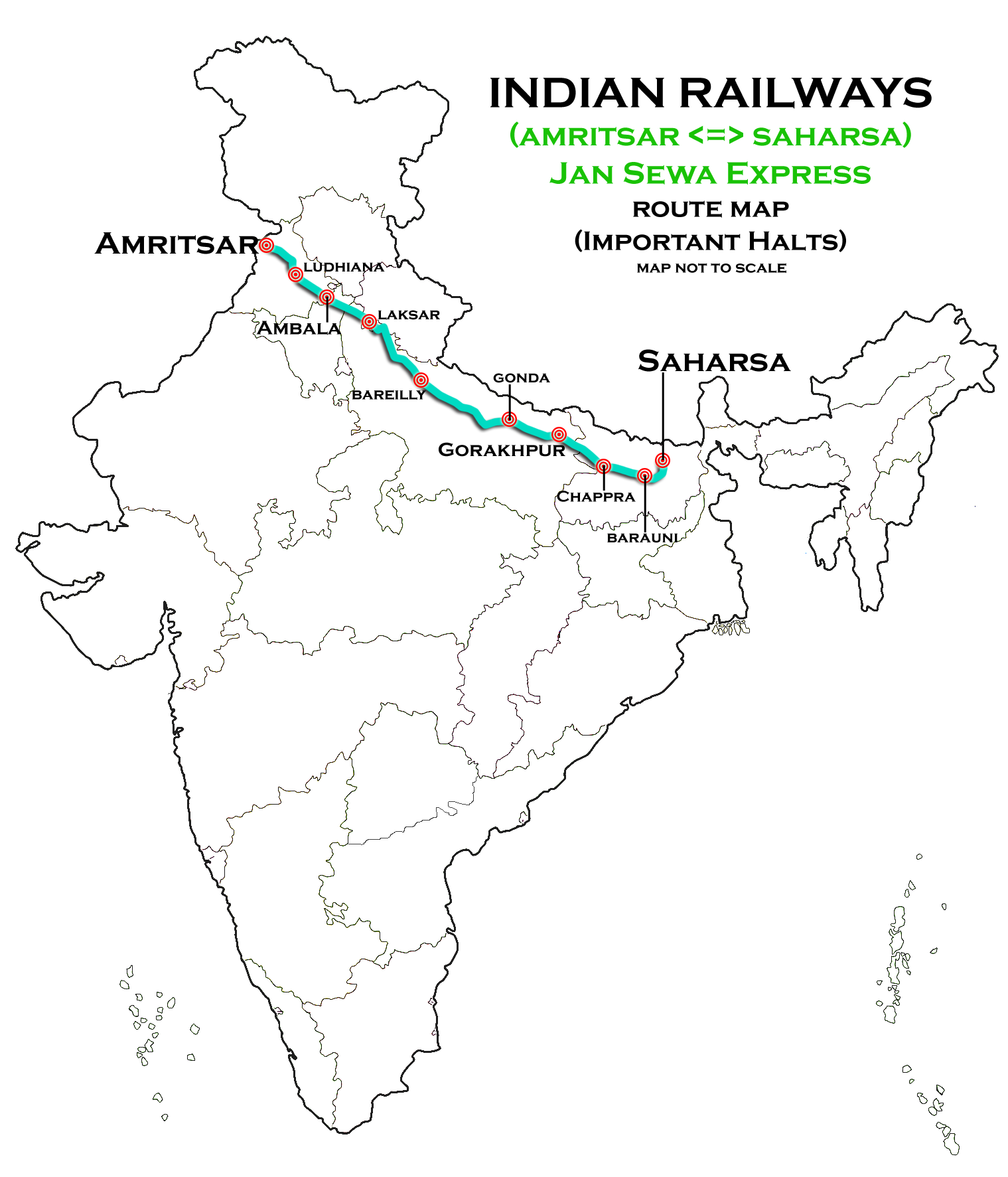

The 14617 / 18 Purnia Court–Amritsar Junction Jan Sewa Express is an Express train belonging to Indian Railways Northern Railway zone that runs between Purnia Court and Amritsar Junction in India.

It operates as train number 14617 from Purnia Court to Amritsar Junction and as train number 14618 in the reverse direction serving the states of Bihar, Uttar Pradesh Uttarakhand, Haryana & Punjab.

== Coaches ==
The 14617 / 18 Purnia Court–Amritsar Junction Jan Sewa Express has 22 general unreserved & two SLR (seating with luggage rake) coaches. It does not carry a pantry car.

As is customary with most train services in India, coach composition may be amended at the discretion of Indian Railways depending on demand.

== Service ==
The 14617 Purnia Court–Amritsar Junction Jan Sewa Express covers the distance of 1,619 km (1,006 mi) in 36 hours (47 km/h) and in 36 hours as the 14618 Amritsar Junction– Purnia Court Jan Sewa Express (46 km/h).

As the average speed of the train is lower than 55 km/h (34 mph), as per railway rules, its fare doesn't includes a Superfast surcharge.

== Routing ==
The 14617 / 18 Purnia Court–Amritsar Junction Jan Sewa Express runs from Purnia Court via Banmankhi Junction, Saharsa Junction, Barauni Junction, Hajipur Junction, Chhapra Junction, Gorakhpur Junction, Gonda Junction, Moradabad Junction, Laksar Junction, Saharanpur Junction, Ambala Cantonment Junction, Sirhind, Ludhiana Junction, Jalandhar City Junction to Amritsar Junction.

== Traction ==
As the route is fully electrified, a Barauni-based WAP-5 electric locomotive to its destination.
