= Kosi Express =

Train in India

Overview
- Service type: Express
- Status: Active
- First service: 22 June 2016; 10 years ago (extended to Purnia Court)
- Current operator: South Eastern Railway
- Ridership: Often serves high-volume routes with high occupancy rates, especially for commuters heading to major junctions like Patna or Gaya, with some reports noting daily passenger counts over 100.

Route
- Termini: Purnia Court (PRNC); Hatia (HTE)
- Stops: 42
- Distance travelled: 722 km (449 mi)
- Average journey time: 19 hrs 15 mins
- Service frequency: Daily (Note: Runs seven day in a week for every direction.)
- Train number: 18625 / 18626

On-board services
- Classes: AC 2 Tier, AC 3 Tier, Sleeper Class, Second Class Seating, General Unreserved
- Seating arrangements: Yes
- Sleeping arrangements: Yes
- Catering facilities: E-catering, On-board catering
- Observation facilities: Large windows
- Baggage facilities: No
- Other facilities: Below the seats

Technical
- Rolling stock: LHB coach
- Track gauge: 1,676 mm (5 ft 6 in)
- Operating speed: 38 km/h (24 mph) average including halts.

The 18625 / 18626 Kosi Express is an express train belonging to South Eastern Railway zone that runs between Purnia Court and Hatia in India. It is currently being operated with 18625/18626 train numbers on a daily basis.

== Service ==
The 18625/Kosi Express has an average speed of 38 km/h and covers 722 km in 19h 15m. The 18626/Kosi Express has an average speed of 40 km/h and covers 722 km in 18h 00m

== Route and halts ==
Station Code	Station Name	Distance (km)
PRNC	Bihar Purnia Court	0
BNKI	Banmankhi	31
MRIJ	Murliganj	50
DMH	Dauram Madhepura	72
SHC	Saharsa Junction	94
SBV	Simri Bakhtiyarpur	111
KFA	Koparia	117
BHB	Badla Ghat	130
MNE	Mansi Junction	136
KGG	Khagaria Junction	145
SKJ	Sahibpur Kamal Junction	158
LKN	Lakhminia	167
BGS	Begusarai	185
HTZU	Hathidah Upper	211
MKA	Mokama	219
PHK	Punarakh	235
BARH	Barh	245
BKP	Bakhtiyarpur Junction	263
KOO	Khusropur	278
FUT	Fatuha Junction	286
PNC	Patna Sahib	298
RJPB	Rajendra Nagar Terminal	306
PNBE	Patna Junction	308
PPN	Punpun	322
TEA	Taregna	338
JHD	Jehanabad	353
BELA	Bela	381
GAYA	Gaya Junction	401
TKN	Tankuppa	420
PRP	Paharpur	433
KQR	Jharkhand Koderma Junction	477
PSB	Parsabad	503
HZD	Hazaribagh Road	525
PNME	Parasnath	552
GMO	Gomoh Junction	570
CRP	Chandrapura Junction	587
BKSC	Bokaro Steel City	603
PNW	Pundag	6019
MURI	Muri Junction	655
RNC	Ranchi Junction	718
HTE	Hatia	725

== Coach composition ==
The train has standard ICF rakes with a max speed of 110 kmph. The train consists of 23 coaches:

- 1 AC Two Tier Sleeper
- 2 AC Three Tier Sleeper
- 5 Sleeper Class
- 2 AC Chair Car
- 1 Non AC Chair Car
- 10 General Unreserved
- 2 (SLR)Seating cum Luggage Rake

== Traction ==
Both trains are hauled by a Gomoh Loco Shed-based WAP-7 electric locomotive from Hatia to Purnia Court & vice versa.

== Direction reversal ==
The train reverses its direction 2 times:

- Saharsa Junction
- Gaya Junction

== See also ==
- Durg Junction railway station
- Purnia Court railway station
- Patna–Hatia Super Express
