= Jogbani railway station =

Railway station in Araria, Bihar, India

Jogbani
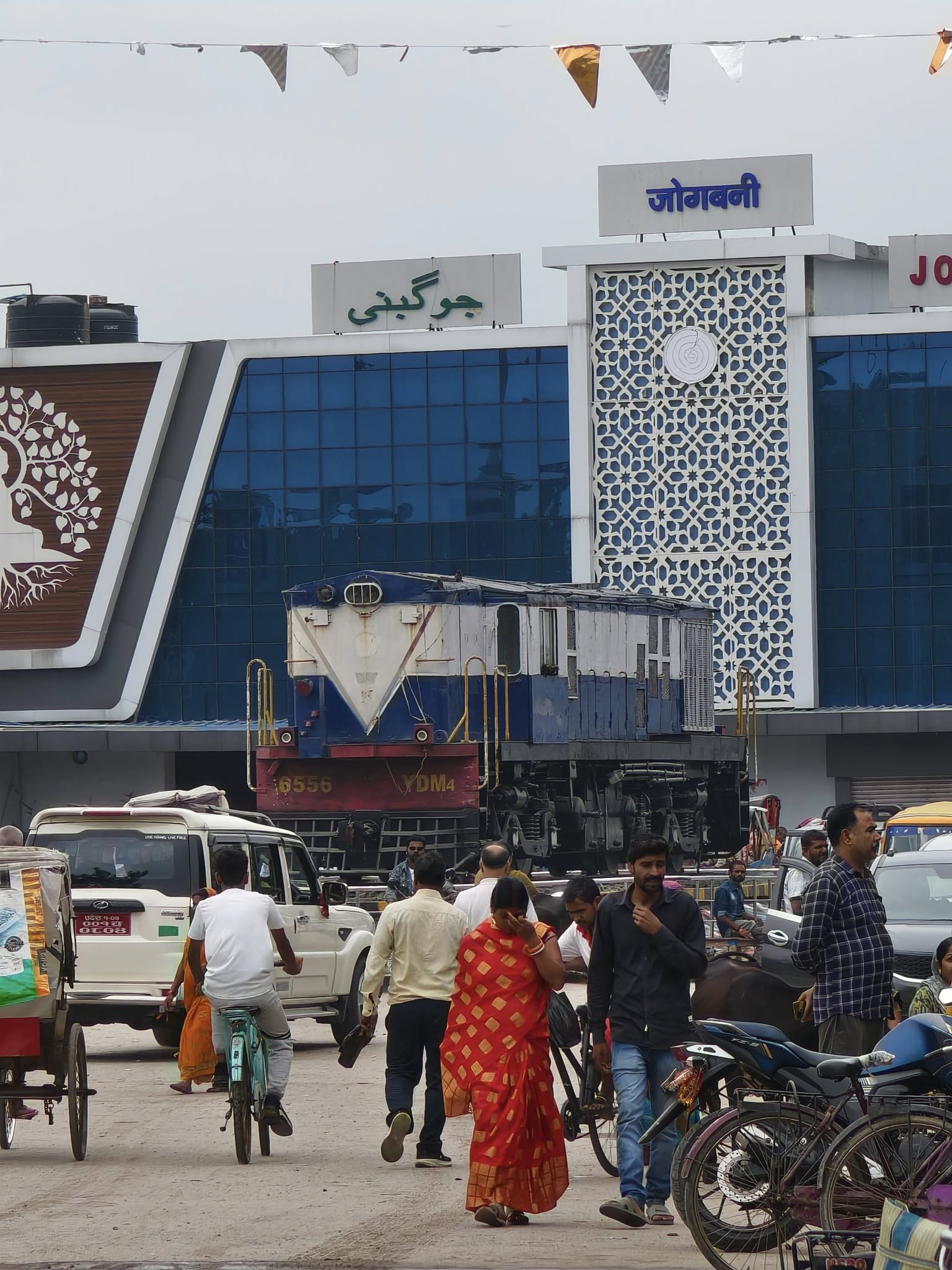
- Jogbani Railway Station Main Entrance

General information
- Location: Station Road, Jogbani, Araria district, Bihar; India
- Coordinates: 26.4°N 87.26°E
- Elevation: 67 metres (220 ft)
- Owner: Ministry of Railways, Indian Railways
- Line: Jogbani–Katihar line
- Platforms: 3
- Tracks: 4
- Connections: Auto stand

Construction
- Structure type: At grade
- Parking: Yes
- Cycle facilities: No

Other information
- Station code: JBN
- Zone(s): Northeast Frontier Railway
- Division(s): Katihar
- Fare zone: Northeast Frontier Railway, Katihar railway division
Location
- Location within India Location within Bihar
- Interactive map of Jogbani

Jogbani railway station (station code: JBN), is located in the town of Jogbani, in the Araria district, of Indian state of Bihar. The station is situated approximately 2 kilometres (1.2 mi) from the India–Nepal border, making it an important transit point for both passenger and freight movement between the two countries.

It operates under the Northeast Frontier Railway (NFR) zone of Indian Railways and falls within the Katihar railway division.

== Redevlopment ==
Jogbani Railway Station has recently undergone a major transformation. A new station building and platform sheds have been completed, while the station yard is being upgraded with the construction of a pit line (for train maintenance) and a washing shed. Jogbani Railway Station has recently undergone major upgrades, including the construction of a new station building and platform sheds, while the station yard is being upgraded with a pit line and washing shed.

== Major trains ==
Train No.	Name	From	To	Type/Class	Arrival	Departure	Days
26302	Danapur-Jogbani Vande Bharat Express	Danapur (DNR)	Jogbani (JBN)	Vande Bharat/CC	01:20	DSTN	Mon, Tue, Thu, Fri, Sat, Sun
15724	Siliguri Town-Jogbani Express	Siliguri Town (SGUT)	Jogbani (JBN)	Mail/GEN	02:00	DSTN	Tue, Wed, Fri, Sat, Sun
26301	Jogbani–Danapur Vande Bharat Express	Jogbani (JBN)	Danapur (DNR)	Vande Bharat/CC	SRC	03:25	Mon, Tue, Thu, Fri, Sat, Sun
13214	SHC JBN Express	Saharsa Jn (SHC)	Jogbani (JBN)	Mail/2A,3A,SL,GEN,PWD	03:50	DSTN	Daily
15723	JBN SGUT Express	Jogbani (JBN)	Siliguri Town (SGUT)	Mail	SRC	04:30	Mon, Tue, Thu, Fri, Sat
13211	JBN DNR Express	Jogbani (JBN)	Danapur (DNR)	Mail	SRC	04:45	Daily
75762	JBN-KIR DMU	Jogbani (JBN)	Katihar Jn (KIR)	DMU/GEN	SRC	05:15	Daily
75757	KIR-JBN DMU	Katihar Jn (KIR)	Jogbani (JBN)	DMU	06:45	DSTN	Daily
75758	JBN-KIR DMU	Jogbani (JBN)	Katihar Jn (KIR)	DMU	SRC	07:15	Daily
12488	Seemanchal Express	Anand Vihar Terminal (ANVT)	Jogbani (JBN)	Superfast	07:50	DSTN	Daily
75753	KIR-JBN DMU	Katihar Jn (KIR)	Jogbani (JBN)	DMU/GEN	09:30	DSTN	Daily
75754	JBN-KIR DMU	Jogbani (JBN)	Katihar Jn (KIR)	DMU/GEN	SRC	10:00	Daily
13159	KOAA JBN Express	Kolkata Terminal (KOAA)	Jogbani (JBN)	Mail	10:50	DSTN	Tue, Thu, Sat
75759	KIR-JBN DMU	Katihar Jn (KIR)	Jogbani (JBN)	DMU/GEN	13:50	DSTN	Daily
13160	JBN KOAA Express	Jogbani (JBN)	Kolkata Terminal (KOAA)	Mail	SRC	14:45	Tue, Thu, Sat
75760	JBN-KIR DMU	Jogbani (JBN)	Katihar Jn (KIR)	DMU	SRC	15:00	Daily
16602	Amrit Bharat Express	Jogbani (JBN)	Erode Jn (ED)	Amrit Bharat/GEN,PWD	SRC	15:15	Sun
75745	KIR-JBN DMU	Katihar Jn (KIR)	Jogbani (JBN)	DMU/GEN	15:35	DSTN	Daily
13212	DNR JBN Express	Danapur (DNR)	Jogbani (JBN)	Mail	16:30	DSTN	Daily
75746	JBN-KIR DMU	Jogbani (JBN)	Katihar Jn (KIR)	DMU/GEN	16:35	SRC	Daily
04008	JBN Festival Special	Anand Vihar Terminal (ANVT)	Jogbani (JBN)	Train on Demand	17:00	DSTN	Sun
13213	JBN SHC Express	Jogbani (JBN)	Saharsa Jn (SHC)	Mail/2A,3A,SL,GEN,PWD	SRC	17:00	Daily
75755	KIR-JBN DMU	Katihar Jn (KIR)	Jogbani (JBN)	DMU/GEN	17:35	DSTN	Daily
75756	JBN-KIR DMU	Jogbani (JBN)	Katihar Jn (KIR)	DMU/GEN	18:15	SRC	Daily
04007	JBN ANVT Special	Jogbani (JBN)	Anand Vihar Terminal (ANVT)	Train on Demand	SRC	18:30	Sun
04195	AGC JBN Festival Special	Agra Cantt Jn (AGC)	Jogbani (JBN)	Train on Demand/SL,GEN	18:45	DSTN	Sat
16601	JBN Amrit Bharat Express	Erode Jn (ED)	Jogbani (JBN)	Amrit Bharat/GEN,PWD	19:00	DSTN	Sat
12487	Seemanchal Express	Jogbani (JBN)	Anand Vihar Terminal (ANVT)	Superfast	SRC	20:45	Daily
04196	JBN AGC Special	Jogbani (JBN)	Agra Cantt Jn (AGC)	Train on Demand/SL,GEN	SRC	21:00	Sat
75761	KIR-JBN DMU	Katihar Jn (KIR)	Jogbani (JBN)	DMU/GEN	21:30	DSTN	Daily
15501	RXL JBN Express	Raxaul Jn (RXL)	Jogbani (JBN)	Mail/3A,SL,GEN	22:30	DSTN	Mon, Thu
15502	JBN RXL Express	Jogbani (JBN)	Raxaul Jn (RXL)	Mail/3A,SL,GEN	SRC	23:45	Mon, Thu

== See also ==
- Katihar Junction railway station
- Muzaffarpur Junction railway station
- Saharsa Junction railway station
- Patna Junction railway station
