= Forbesganj =

- City
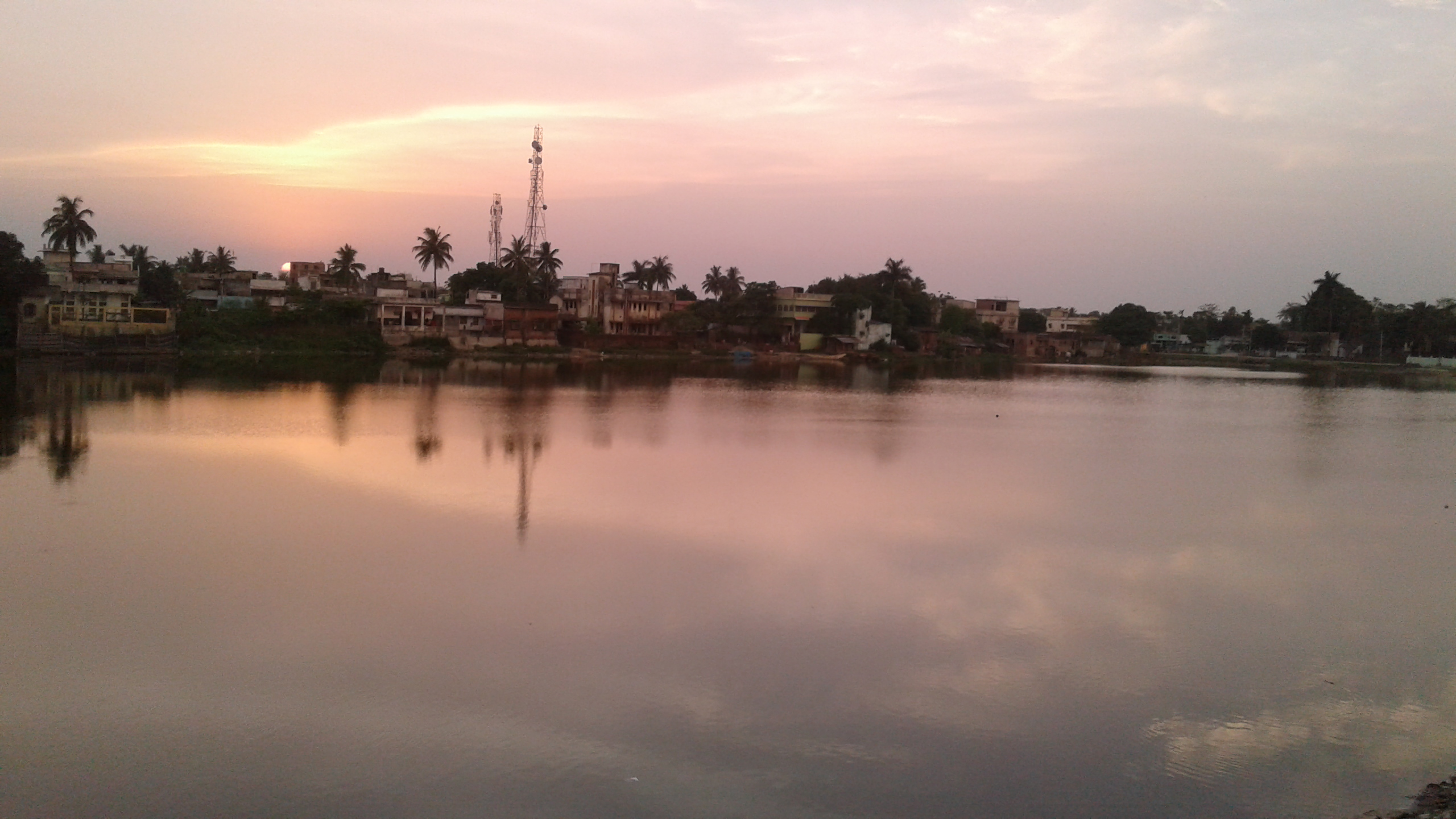
- Sunset at Sultan Pokhat, Forbesganj

- Location in Bihar, India Forbesganj (India)
- Coordinates: 26.300°N 87.265°E
- Country: India
- State: Bihar
- Region: Mithila
- District: Araria
- Named for: Forbesganj

Government
  - Type: Municipal Council
  - Body: Forbesganj Municipal Council
  - MLA: Mr. Manoj Bishwas

Area
  - Total: 25 km^{2} (9.7 sq mi)
- Elevation: 46 m (151 ft)

Population (2011)
  - Total: 140,475
  - Density: 5,600/km^{2} (15,000/sq mi)

Languages
  - Official: Hindi
  - Regional: Maithili
- Time zone: UTC+5:30 (IST)
- PIN: 854318
- Telephone code: 06455-22****
- Vehicle registration: BR-38
- Sex ratio: 1.14 ♂/♀
- Lok Sabha constituency: Araria-09
- Vidhan Sabha constituency: Forbesganj-048

Forbesganj is a city with municipality in the Araria District (formerly Purnia District before 1992) in the state of Bihar, India, situated at the border of Nepal.

== Politics ==
Historically, the first MLA of the Forbesganj constituency following independent India's inaugural 1952 Bihar Legislative Assembly election was Bokai Mandal of the Indian National Congress (INC). Mandal achieved a comprehensive victory by securing 14,062 votes, defeating Bholanath Mandal of the Socialist Party. Coming from the Extremely Backward Classes (EBC) community, his early entry into the legislature was a milestone for inclusive politics in the Seemanchal territory. Mandal spearheaded early developmental projects and public institutions in the post-independence era, leading local chroniclers and inhabitants to regard him as the "Father of Forbesganj" (फारबिसगंज के जनक). In recognition of his foundational administrative layout and community service, a core commercial road in the city area is officially designated as the Bokai Mandal Path.

== Etymology ==
During the British Raj, the area was under the administration of British district collector and municipal commissioner, Alexander John Forbes (1807–1890), of the East India Company. Forbes had a bungalow at the same location. Consequently, the area was known as 'residential area', also abbreviated as 'R-area'. Over time the name transformed to 'Araria' and the neighboring subdivision came to be known as 'Forbesganj'.

== History ==
The town was given its present name from its British district collector and municipal commissioner, Alexander John Forbes (1807–1890). He was also in the team of Commissioner George Yule of Bhagalpur while fighting the rebels of 73rd native infantry. Forbes founded the Sultanpur estate and a number of indigo factories situated at different places in this district.

After the country's independence the name was changed to Forbesganj. It is said that the British used this place for Indigo farming. Remains of the British premises can be seen at the banks of the famous landlocked body of water Sultan Pokhar.

== Geography ==
Forbesganj is located at 26.3°N 87.25°E. It has an average elevation of 46 meters (150 feet). The Nepalese border is only 12 km away.

== Climate ==
Forbesganj has hot and wet summers, and cold and dry winters. The city also holds the record of having experienced the coldest ever recorded temperature in Bihar at −2.1 °C.

Climate data for Forbesganj (1991–2020)
Month	Jan	Feb	Mar	Apr	May	Jun	Jul	Aug	Sep	Oct	Nov	Dec	Year
Record high °C (°F)	33.6 (92.5)	34.2 (93.6)	39.2 (102.6)	41.8 (107.2)	42.2 (108.0)	42.6 (108.7)	40.6 (105.1)	38.6 (101.5)	38.6 (101.5)	37.2 (99.0)	35.6 (96.1)	34.2 (93.6)	42.6 (108.7)
Mean daily maximum °C (°F)	20.8 (69.4)	25.6 (78.1)	31.4 (88.5)	34.0 (93.2)	34.0 (93.2)	33.8 (92.8)	32.7 (90.9)	33.1 (91.6)	32.9 (91.2)	32.2 (90.0)	30.1 (86.2)	25.2 (77.4)	30.6 (87.1)
Mean daily minimum °C (°F)	9.9 (49.8)	13.3 (55.9)	16.8 (62.2)	20.4 (68.7)	22.7 (72.9)	24.5 (76.1)	25.1 (77.2)	25.3 (77.5)	25.5 (77.9)	22.9 (73.2)	16.3 (61.3)	11.8 (53.2)	19.7 (67.5)
Record low °C (°F)	1.0 (33.8)	5.2 (41.4)	7.0 (44.6)	12.0 (53.6)	14.0 (57.2)	15.0 (59.0)	17.0 (62.6)	11.4 (52.5)	15.0 (59.0)	12.0 (53.6)	7.6 (45.7)	4.0 (39.2)	1.0 (33.8)
Average rainfall mm (inches)	9.1 (0.36)	11.2 (0.44)	15.7 (0.62)	49.6 (1.95)	137.5 (5.41)	269.3 (10.60)	452.1 (17.80)	339.9 (13.38)	226.4 (8.91)	60.0 (2.36)	1.6 (0.06)	0.7 (0.03)	1,573.2 (61.94)
Average rainy days	0.8	1.2	1.2	3.3	7.0	11.1	12.0	12.4	9.1	2.5	0.2	0.1	60.9
Average relative humidity (%) (at 17:30 IST)	79	72	64	66	69	75	80	77	78	75	73	77	74
Source: India Meteorological Department

== Demographics ==
Religions in Forbesganj
Religion	Percent
Hindus	68.12%
Muslims	29.57%
Jains	2.04%
Others	0.27%

The city is divided into 25 wards for which elections are held every 5 years. The Forbesganj nagar parishad has a population of 50,475 of which 26,524 are males while 23,951 are females as per report released by Census India 2011.

The population of children age of 0–6 is 7,512, 14.88% of the total population of Forbesganj. The female sex ratio is 903 against the state average of 918. Moreover, the child sex ratio in Forbesganj is around 963 compared to Bihar state average of 935. The literacy rate of Forbesganj is 78.64%, higher than the state average of 61.80%. In Forbesganj, male literacy is around 82.94% while the female literacy rate is 73.83%.

== Administration and politics ==
Forbesganj Municipal Corporation is responsible for maintaining the city's civic infrastructure and carrying out associated administrative duties.

Vidhan Sabha constituency is an assembly constituency in Araria district in the Indian state of Bihar. Vidyasagar Kesari is the MLA of Forbesganj assembly constituency. He was first elected in 2015 Bihar Legislative Assembly election, and re-elected in 2020 Bihar Legislative Assembly election.

=== Amenities ===
Sub divisional Hospital Forbesganj is located near the Subdivision Office, Forbesganj

== Economy ==
In addition to its role as an educational and administrative place, the economy of this small city is fueled by fertilizer production, rice production, building and construction material supply, and other industry.

Makhana is produced in Forbesganj, Makhana packets are prepared and sent by train to other cities.

== Culture/Cityscape ==
The city is well planned with a central road, Sadar Road, running through the heart of Forbesganj. Most of the major shops are located on both the sides of this road. Another major road, Hospital Road, connects to the main bus stand; it passes through the other part of the city and joins to the highways.

== Media ==
Major daily Hindi news circulated in Forbesganj include Dainik Jagaran, Hindustan, Dainik Bhaskar and Prabhat Khabar.

== Transport ==
=== Road ===
( NH 27 Formerly NH-57) and NH 527 connects Forbesganj. Daily bus service is available from the Purnia, Patna, Siliguri, Kolkata, Bhagalpur, Katihar, Birpur, Jogbani, Saharsa, Darbhanga, Mehsi & Muzaffarpur.

=== Rail ===
Forbesganj Junction railway station lies on Barauni–Katihar, Saharsa and Purnia sections. There are direct trains available to the major cities (Delhi Junction/Kolkata/Siliguri, etc.) of the country, apart from local trains running between Jogbani and Katihar Junction. The Saharsa–Forbesganj section and Darbhanga-Forbesganj section are functional since March 2024. A train for local connectivity connecting Raxaul, Danapur, Saharsa, Darbhanga, and Muzaffarpur has been started. A new railway line of 17.60 km connecting Laxmipur–Forbesganj to strengthen northeast connectivity is proposed and undergoing final location survey at present.

=== Air ===
Forbesganj Airport was a functional military airport between 1934 and 1942 (active during World War II) and again during the 1962 war with China. On 10 June 1973 a Royal Nepal Airlines DHC-6 Twin Otter Plane was hijacked en route to Kathmandu from Biratnagar. This airport has now fallen into disrepair and is not operational.

The nearest active airport to this place is Biratnagar (Nepal). Closest domestic airports are Darbhanga Airport in Darbhanga, Bihar and Bagdogra Airport in Siliguri, West Bengal, both about 160 km away. Jay Prakash Narayan International Airport in the Bihar state's capital city Patna is approximately 300 km. away. From Bagdogra Airport it takes 3–4 hours to reach the city by road.

== Education ==
There are several CBSE and State Board schools in this city. Some Senior Secondary schools are Mithila Public School (established in 1989), S.R.S Vidya Mandir, Modern/Premier Academy, Pi World school, Shishu Bharti, Delhi Public School Forbesganj, DAV Public School, Central Public School, Dev Gurukul Primary School and Sisu Mandir, Genius Academy, Sankalp vidyapeeth etc.

All Colleges of this city are under Purnia University. There is also Engineering colleges present in the city named Moti Babu Institute of Technology and a government engineering college Phanishwar Nath Renu Engineering College under Department of Science and Technology, Bihar at Simraha. Avi international school near college chowk

== Notable people ==
- Phanishwar Nath Renu from Simraha (Forbesgsanj)
- Bokai Mandal – First MLA of the Forbesganj Assembly constituency (1952) and political leader.
