= New Jalpaiguri–Guwahati Intercity Express =

Train in India

New Jalpaiguri - Guwahati Intercity Express

Overview
- Service type: Express
- Status: Active
- Locale: West Bengal and Assam
- First service: 23 March 2026; 32 days ago
- Current operator: Northeast Frontier Railway (NFR)

Route
- Termini: New Jalpaiguri Junction (NJP); Guwahati Junction (GHY)
- Stops: 20
- Distance travelled: 407 km (253 mi)
- Average journey time: 9h 0m
- Service frequency: Daily
- Train number: 15675 / 15676

On-board services
- Classes: General Unreserved, Sleeper Class, AC 3rd Class Economy, AC 2nd Class
- Seating arrangements: Yes
- Sleeping arrangements: Yes
- Catering facilities: No
- Observation facilities: Large windows
- Baggage facilities: No
- Other facilities: Below the seats

Technical
- Rolling stock: LHB coach
- Track gauge: 1,676 mm (5 ft 6 in)
- Electrification: 25 kV 50 Hz AC Overhead line
- Operating speed: 130 km/h (81 mph) maximum, 45 km/h (28 mph) average including halts.
- Track owner: Indian Railways
Route map
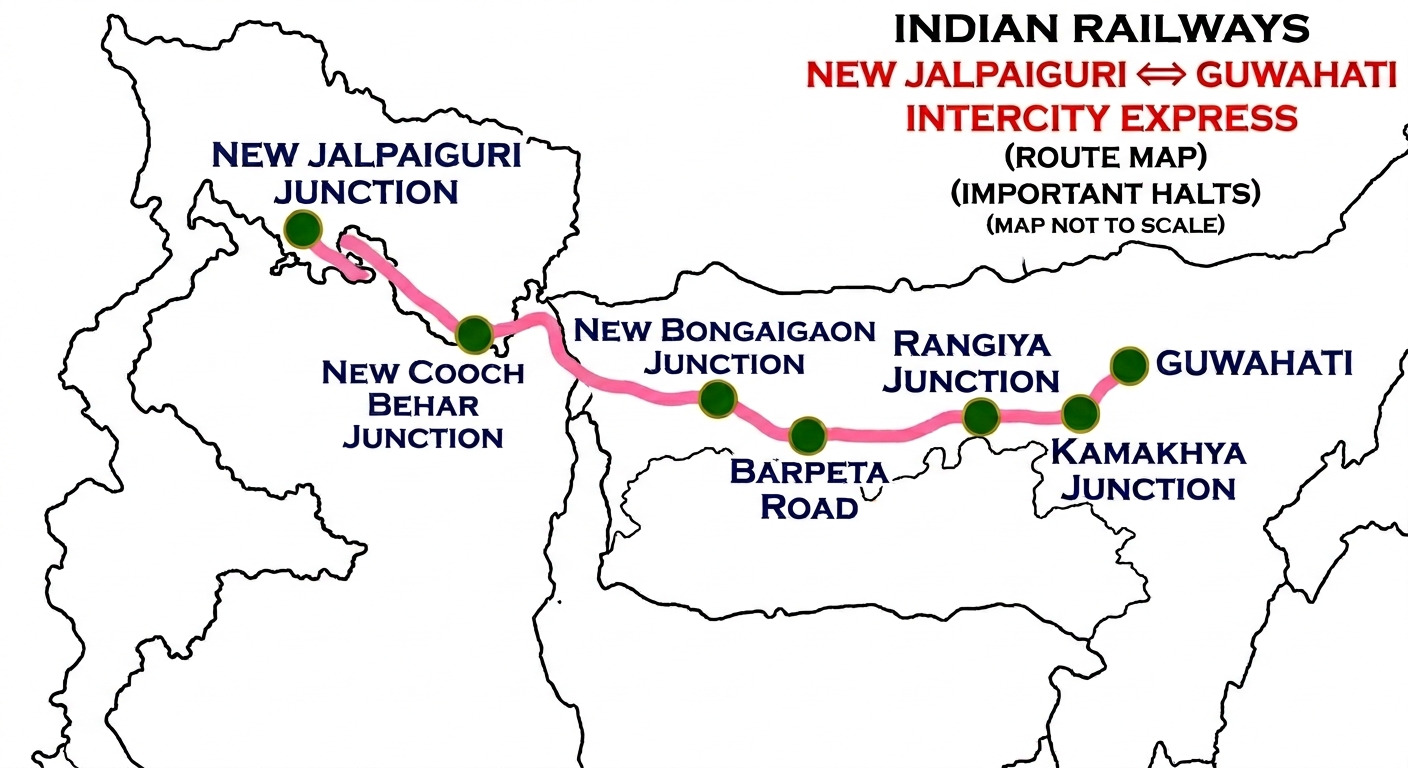

The 15675 / 15676 New Jalpaiguri–Guwahati Intercity Express is an express train belonging to Northeast Frontier Railway zone that runs between the city New Jalpaiguri Junction of West Bengal and Guwahati of Assam in India.

It operates as train number 15675 from New Jalpaiguri Junction to Guwahati and as train number 15676 in the reverse direction, serving the state of Assam and West Bengal.

== Services ==
• 15675/ New Jalpaiguri–Guwahati Intercity Express has an average speed of 45 km/h and covers 407 km in 9h 0m.

• 15676/ Guwahati–New Jalpaiguri Intercity Express has an average speed of 48 km/h and covers 407 km in 8h 30m.

== Route and halts ==
The important halts of the train are :

- New Jalpaiguri Junction
- Dhupguri
- Falakata
- New Cooch Behar Junction
- New Alipurduar
- Kamakhyaguri
- Gossaigaon Hat
- Kokrajhar
- New Bongaigaon Junction
- Bijni
- Barpeta Road
- Sorupeta
- Pathsala
- Tihu
- Kaithalkuchi
- Nalbari
- Rangiya Junction
- Changsari
- Kamakhya Junction
- Guwahati

== Schedule ==
• 15675 - 11:30 PM (Daily) [New Jalpaiguri Junction]

• 15676 - 10:30 AM (Daily) [Guwahati]

== Coach composition ==
1. General Unreserved - 4
2. Sleeper Class - 7
3. AC 3rd Class Economy - 7
4. AC 2nd Class - 2

== Traction ==
As the entire route is fully electrified, it is hauled by a Asansol Loco Shed-based WAP-7 electric locomotive from New Jalpaiguri Junction to Guwahati and vice versa.

== Rake reversal or rake share ==
No rake reversal or rake share.

== See also ==
Trains from New Jalpaiguri Junction :

1. Paharia Express
2. New Jalpaiguri–Anand Vihar Terminal Superfast Express
3. Howrah–New Jalpaiguri Shatabdi Express
4. New Jalpaiguri–Patna Vande Bharat Express
5. New Jalpaiguri–Amritsar Amrit Bharat Express

Trains from Guwahati :

1. Guwahati–Jorhat Town Jan Shatabdi Express
2. Kolkata–Guwahati Garib Rath Express
3. Guwahati–Sairang Express
4. Guwahati–Dibrugarh Shatabdi Express
5. Saraighat Express

== Notes ==
a. Runs daily in a week with both directions.
