= New Jalpaiguri–Guwahati Express =

Express train in India

Overview
- Service type: Express
- Locale: West Bengal, Assam
- First service: 13th March 2026
- Current operator: Northeast Frontier Railway zone

Route
- Termini: New Jalpaiguri Junction (NJP); Guwahati (GHY)
- Stops: 18
- Distance travelled: 407.5 km (253 mi)
- Service frequency: Daily
- Train number: 15675 / 15676
- Lines used: New Jalpaiguri–New Bongaigaon line; New Bongaigaon–Guwahati line

On-board services
- Classes: 2A, 3E, SL, GS, SLRD, EOG
- Seating arrangements: Yes
- Sleeping arrangements: Yes
- Catering facilities: E catering

Technical
- Rolling stock: Standard Indian Railways Coaches
- Track gauge: 1,676 mm (5 ft 6 in)
- Operating speed: 45 km/h (28 mph)

New Jalpaiguri–Guwahati Express (Train no. 15675/15676) is a daily service connecting Siliguri and Guwahati. The train starts from New Jalpaiguri Junction and ends in Guwahati railway station, crossing West Bengal and Assam.

== Service ==
The train is operated by Indian Railways under the Northeast Frontier Railway zone. It operates daily between New Jalpaiguri Junction and Guwahati. Train number 15675 departs from New Jalpaiguri Junction and arrives at Guwahati the following day. Train number 15676 departs from Guwahati at night and reaches New Jalpaiguri Junction the next day. The route spans 407 km with a scheduled journey time of 8 hours and 30 minutes in both directions.

== Traction ==
A Siliguri Loco Shed – based WAP-7 electric locomotive hauls the train.

== Route and halts ==
The route and halts of New Jalpaiguri – Guwahati Express are as follows:

- New Jalpaiguri Junction
- Dhupguri
- Falakata
- New Cooch Behar
- New Alipurduar
- Kamakhyaguri
- Gossaigaon Hat
- Kokrajhar
- New Bongaigaon
- Bijni
- Barpeta Road
- Pathsala
- Kaithalkuchi
- Nalbari
- Rangiya Junction
- Changsari
- Kamakhya Junction
- Guwahati

== Coaches ==
This train contains 2 - AC Two Tier (2A) coaches, 7 - AC Three Tier Economy (3E) coaches, 7 - Sleeper Class (SL) coaches, 4 - General Unreserved (GS) coaches, 1 - Generator Car and 1 - WAP-7 Engine.

== See also ==
- New Jalpaiguri–Bongaigaon Express
- New Jalpaiguri Junction
- Guwahati
