= Alipurduar–Kamakhya Intercity Express =

Kamakhya - Alipurduar Intercity Express

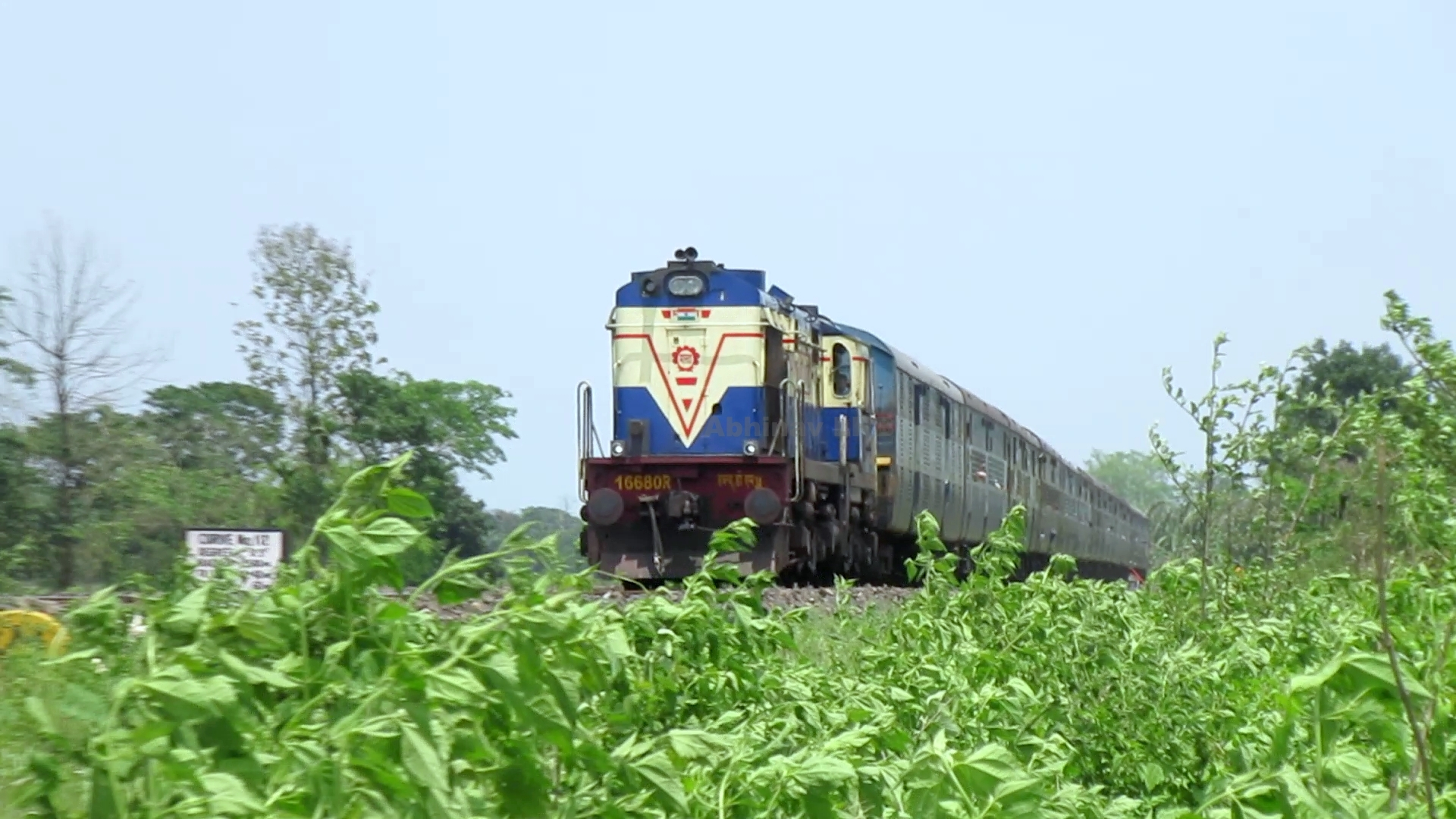
- WDM3A 16680R (MALDA) NFR hauling Alipurduar - Kamakhya Intercity Express

Overview
- Service type: Express
- Locale: Assam & West Bengal
- First service: 29 October 2009; 16 years ago
- Current operator: Northeast Frontier Railway zone

Route
- Termini: Kamakhya Junction (KYQ); Alipurduar Junction (APDJ)
- Stops: 18
- Distance travelled: 298 km (185 mi)
- Average journey time: 7 hours 10 minutes
- Service frequency: Daily
- Train number: 15771/15772

On-board services
- Class: Unreserved
- Seating arrangements: Yes
- Sleeping arrangements: Yes
- Catering facilities: No
- Entertainment facilities: No

Technical
- Rolling stock: 2
- Track gauge: 1,676 mm (5 ft 6 in)
- Operating speed: 42 km/h (26 mph)
Route map
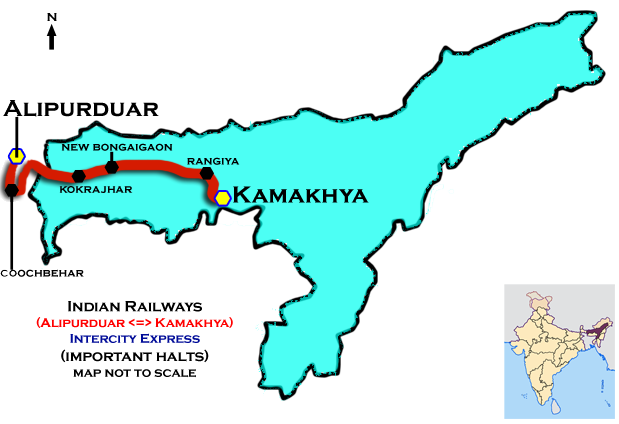

Alipurduar - Kamakhya Intercity Express is an intercity train of the Indian Railways connecting Alipurduar in West Bengal and Kamakhya in Assam. It is currently being operated with 15771/15772 train numbers on a daily basis.

== Service ==
The 15771/Alipur Duar - Kamakhya Intercity Express has an average speed of 40 km/h and covers 298 km in 7 hrs 10 mins. 15772/Kamakhya - Alipur Duar Intercity Express has an average speed of 40 km/h and covers 298 km in 7 hrs 10 mins.

== Route and halts ==
- Alipurduar Junction
- New Cooch Behar
- New Alipurduar
- Kamakhyaguri
- Jorai
- Gossaigaon Hat
- Chautara
- Fakiragram Junction
- Kokrajhar
- Salakati
- New Bongaigaon Junction
- Bijni
- Sarbhog
- Barpeta Road
- Sorupeta
- Pathsala
- Tihu
- Nalbari
- Rangiya Junction
- Kamakhya Junction

== Coach composite ==
The train consists of 11 coaches :

- 9 General
- 2 Second-class Luggage/parcel van

== Traction ==
Both trains are hauled by a New Malda Town Loco Shed based WDM-3A diesel locomotive.
