= Manas Rhino Passenger =

Train in India

Overview
- Service type: Passenger
- Current operator: Northeast Frontier Railway

Route
- Termini: New Bongaigaon (NBQ); Guwahati (GHY)
- Stops: 20
- Distance travelled: 157 km (98 mi)
- Average journey time: 4 h 25 min
- Service frequency: Daily (Note: Runs seven days in a week for every direction.)
- Train number: 55801/55802

On-board services
- Class: Unreserved
- Seating arrangements: Yes
- Sleeping arrangements: No
- Catering facilities: No
- Observation facilities: ICF coach
- Entertainment facilities: No
- Baggage facilities: Below the seats

Technical
- Rolling stock: 2
- Track gauge: 5 ft 6 in (1,676 mm)
- Electrification: Route is electrified but diesel locomotive is operation
- Operating speed: 35 km/h (22 mph) average with halts

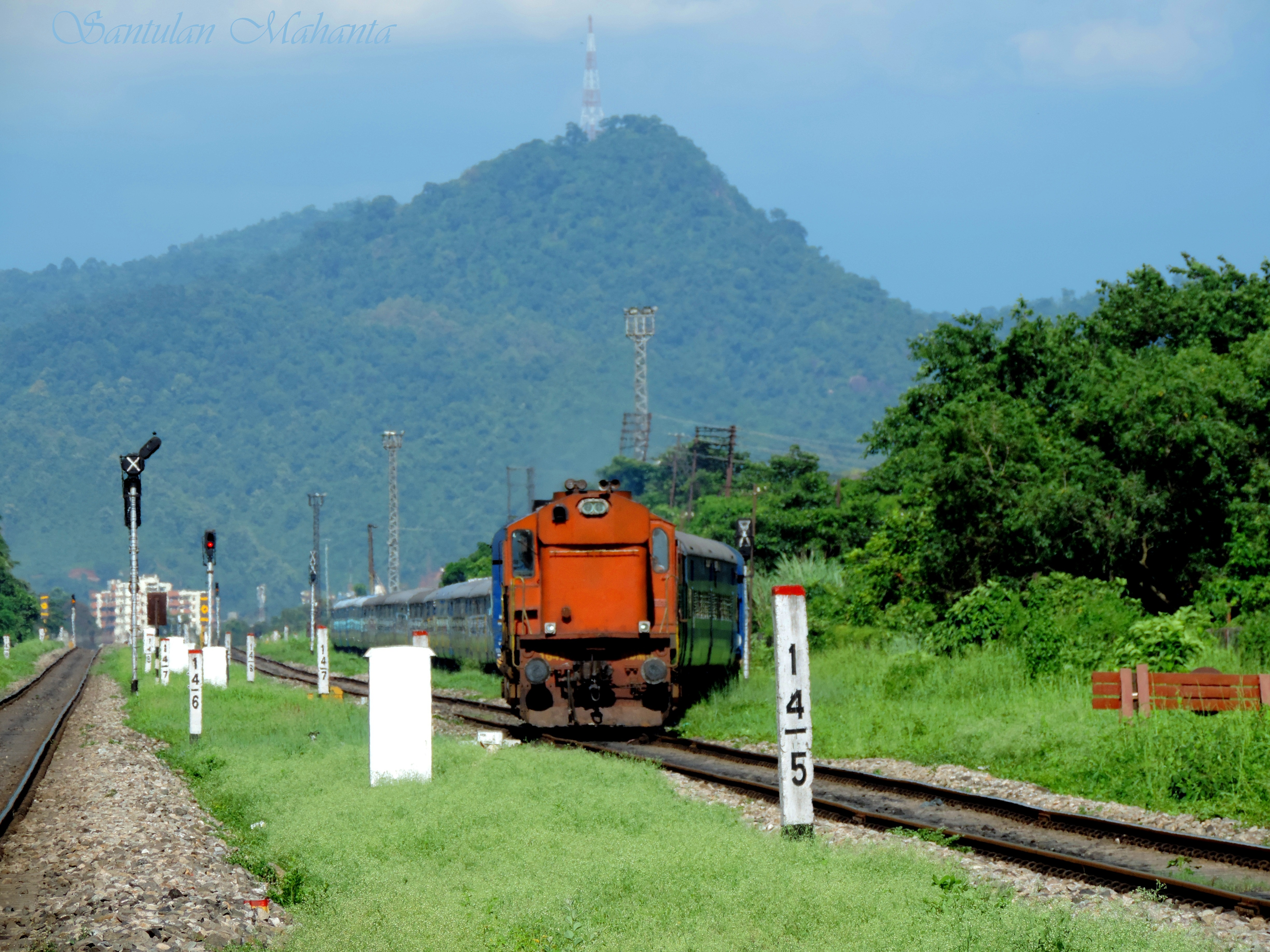
The empty rake of Manas Rhino being pulled from New Guwahati to Guwahati station. The train enjoys high priority in NF Railway

Manas Rhino Passenger is a 24 coach passenger train of the Indian Railways which runs between New Bongaigaon Junction railway station of New Bongaigaon in Assam to Guwahati railway station in Assam.

== Arrival and departure ==
- Train no. 55801 departs from New Bongaigaon, daily at 04:50, reaching Guwahati the same day at 09:15.
- Train no. 55802 departs from Guwahati daily at 17:30. from platform no.5 reaching New Bongaigaon the same day at 21:53.

== Average speed and frequency ==
The train runs with an average speed of 37 km/h. The train runs on daily basis.

== Loco link ==
earlier was WDG-3A. The train is hauled by SGUJ WDP-4/WDP-4B/WDP-4D diesel locomotive.

== Routes and Halts ==
Guwahati

Kamakhya Jn

Agthori

Changsari

Baihata

Kendukana

Rangiya Jn

Ghograpur

Nalbari

Kaithalkuchi

Tihu

Niz-sariha Halt

Pathsala

Sorupeta

Guagachha

Barpeta Road

Sorbhog

Patiladaha

Bijni

Chaprakata

Bongaigaon

New Bongaigaon Jn

and again, it's reversed up to Guwahati
