= Shrirampur (disambiguation) =

Shrirampur is a city in Ahmednagar district in Maharashtra, India.

Shrirampur or Srirampur may also refer to:

- Shrirampur taluka, a tehsil (subdistrict) of Ahmednagar district, Maharashtra, India with the city as its capital
  - Shrirampur Assembly constituency, Maharashtra Legislative Assembly
  - Shrirampur railway station, in the city
- Shrirampur, Arambagh, a village in Pursurah CD block, Arambagh Subdivision, Hooghly district, West Bengal, India
- Srirampur, Burdwan, a census town in Purba Bardhaman district, West Bengal, India
  - Srirampur railway station
- Srirampur Colony, a town in Telangana, India
- Shrirampur, Paschim Medinipur, a village in Paschim Medinipur district, West Bengal, India
- Srirampur Assam railway station, a railway station in Assam, India

== See also ==
- Serampore, a city in Hooghly district, West Bengal, India
  - Srirampore subdivision, a subdivision of West Bengal containing the city
  - Serampore Assembly constituency
  - Serampore Lok Sabha constituency
  - Serampore Municipality, the city's municipal corporation
- Srirampura, a town in Karnataka, India
  - Srirampura metro station, on the Namma Metro of Bengaluru
