= Agthori railway station =

Railway station in Assam

Agthori
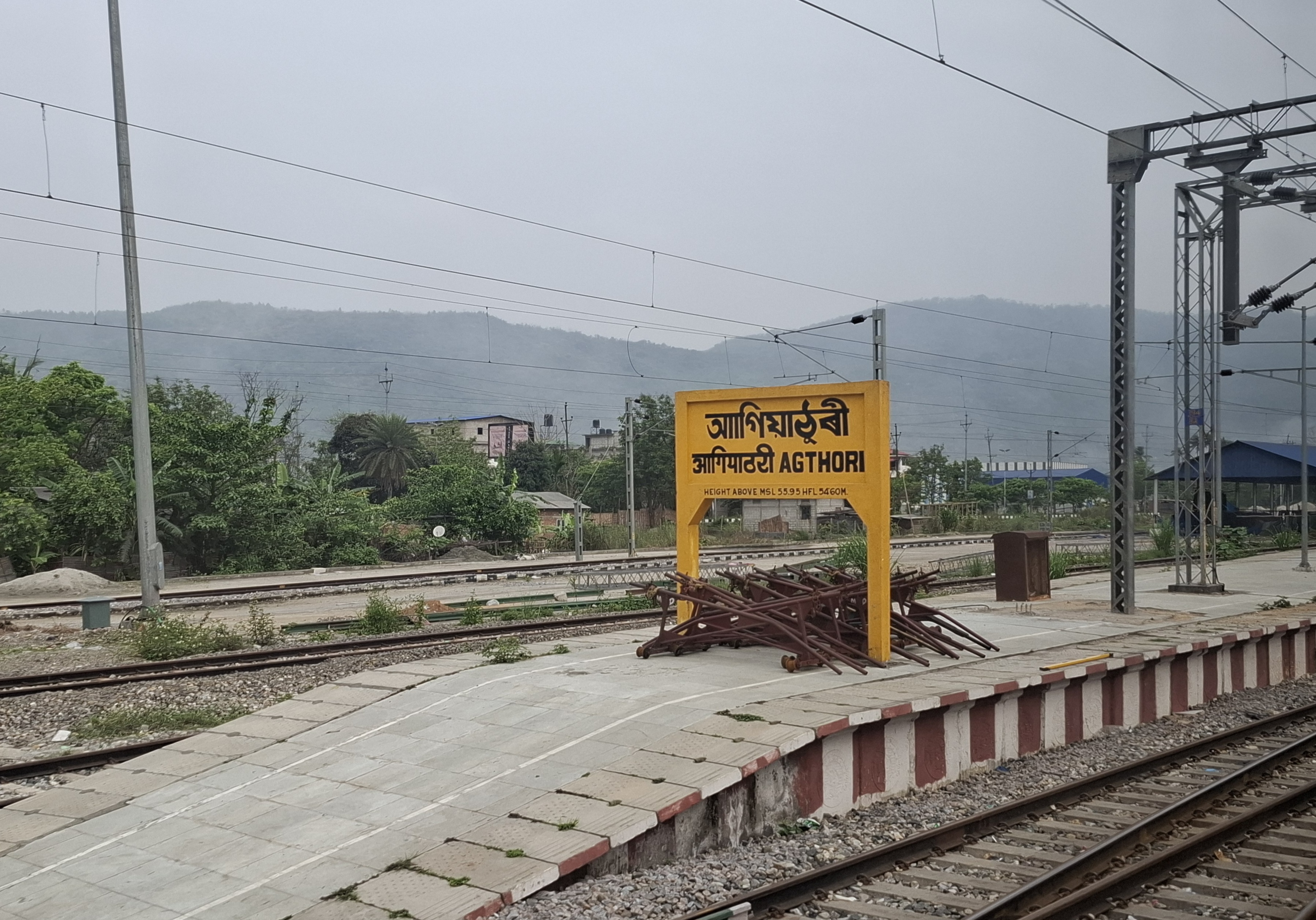

General information
- Location: IIT Guwahati, Assam; India
- Coordinates: 26°12′03″N 91°41′10″E
- Elevation: 52 metres (171 ft)
- System: Indian Railways station
- Owner: Indian Railways
- Platforms: 2
- Tracks: 3
- Connections: Auto stand

Construction
- Structure type: Standard (on-ground station)
- Parking: No
- Cycle facilities: No

Other information
- Status: Single diesel line
- Station code: AGT
- Zone(s): Northeast Frontier Railway zone
Location
- Location within Guwahati Location within Assam

Agthori Railway Station is a small railway station in Guwahati, Assam. Its code is AGT. It serves Guwahati City. The station consists of 2 platforms and is located next to the Indian Institute of Technology Guwahati.

The station is located on the New Bongaigaon–Guwahati section of the Barauni–Guwahati line. It is located at a distance of 13.9 km from the Guwahati railway station.

It is also connected to the Amingaon Container Depot of Container Corporation of India via a line of approximately 686 m in length.

The station is currently not served by any long-distance trains and is served by only passenger trains, which are as follows:

- 55801/55802 Manas Rhino Passenger
- 55753/55754 Shifung Passenger
- 55801/55810 Guwahati–New Bongaigaon Passenger

The station serves the areas of North Guwahati, Amingaon and Hajo.

Preceding station	Indian Railways	Following station
Changsari towards ?	Northeast Frontier Railway zone Barauni–Guwahati line	Kamakhya Junction towards ?
