= Alipurduar–Lumding Intercity Express =

Express train belonging to Indian Railways

Alipurduar Junction - Lumding Junction Intercity Express

Overview
- Service type: Intercity
- Locale: Assam & West Bengal
- First service: 18 January 2011; 15 years ago
- Current operator: Northeast Frontier Railway zone

Route
- Termini: Alipurduar Junction; Lumding Junction
- Stops: 24
- Distance travelled: 446 km (277 mi)
- Average journey time: 9 hours 50 mins
- Service frequency: Daily
- Train number: 15769 / 15770

On-board services
- Class: general unreserved
- Seating arrangements: Yes
- Sleeping arrangements: Yes
- Catering facilities: No

Technical
- Rolling stock: Standard Indian Railways Coaches
- Track gauge: 1,676 mm (5 ft 6 in)
- Operating speed: 45.5 km/h (28 mph)
Route map
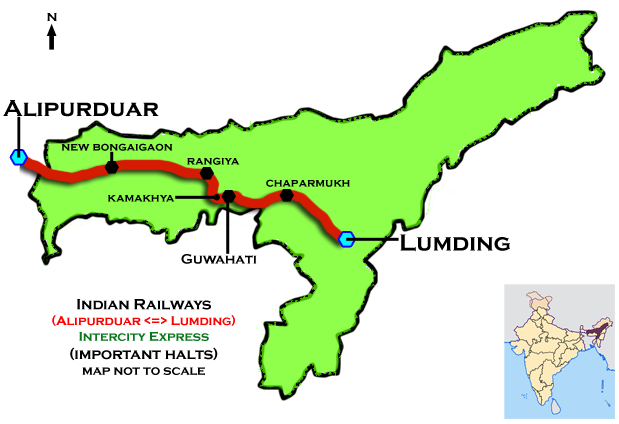

The 15769 / 70 Alipurduar Junction - Lumding Junction Intercity Express is an Express train belonging to Indian Railways Northeast Frontier Railway zone that runs between Alipurduar Junction , West Bengal and Lumding Junction, Assam in India.

It operates as train number 15769 from Alipurduar Junction to Lumding Junction and as train number 15770 in the reverse direction serving the states of Assam & West Bengal.

== Coaches ==
The 15769 / 70 Alipurduar Junction - Lumding Junction Intercity Express has nine general unreserved & two SLR (seating with luggage rake) coaches . It does not carry a pantry car coach.

As is customary with most train services in India, coach composition may be amended at the discretion of Indian Railways depending on demand.

== Service ==
The 22869 Alipurduar Junction - Lumding Junction Intercity Express covers the distance of 446 km (277 mi) in 9 hours 55 mins (45 km/h) and in 9 hours 45 mins as the 15770 Lumding Junction - Alipurduar Junction Intercity Express (46 km/h).

As the average speed of the train is lower than 55 km/h (34 mph), as per railway rules, its fare doesn't includes a Superfast surcharge.

== Routing ==
The 15769 / 70 Alipurduar Junction - Lumding Junction Intercity Express runs from

- Alipurduar Junction via
- Gossaigaon Hat
- Fakiragram Junction
- Kokrajhar
- New Bongaigaon Junction
- Bijni
- Barpeta Road
- Rangiya Junction
- Kamakhya
- Guwahati
- Chaparmukh Junction to
- Lumding Junction.

== Traction ==
As the route is going to electrification, a Malda Town based WDM-3D diesel locomotive pulls the train to its destination. Now it is hauled by a WDP-4D from end to end.
