= Barmer–Guwahati Express =

Train in India

Barmer-Guwahati Express
Overview
- Service type: Express
- First service: 20 July 2002; 23 years ago
- Current operator: Northeast Frontier Railway

Route
- Termini: Barmer (BME); Guwahati (GHY)
- Stops: 31
- Distance travelled: 2,543 km (1,580 mi)
- Average journey time: 50 hours
- Service frequency: Bi-weekly (Note: Runs two days in a week for every direction.)
- Train number: 15631 / 15632

On-board services
- Classes: AC 2 Tier, AC 3 Tier, Sleeper 3 Tier, General Unreserved
- Seating arrangements: No
- Sleeping arrangements: Yes
- Catering facilities: Available
- Observation facilities: Large windows
- Baggage facilities: Available
- Other facilities: Below the seats

Technical
- Rolling stock: LHB coach
- Track gauge: 1,676 mm (5 ft 6 in)
- Operating speed: 51 km/h (32 mph) average including halts.

The 15631 / 15632 Barmer-Guwahati Express is an express train belonging to Northeast Frontier Railway zone that runs between Barmer in Rajasthan and Guwahati in Assam. It is currently being operated with 15631/15632 train numbers on bi-weekly basis.

== Service ==
The 15631/Barmer - Guwahati Express has an average speed of 49 km/h and covers 2454 km in 50 hrs. 15632/Guwahati - Barmer Express has an average speed of 53 km/h and covers 2454 km in 46 hrs 30 mins.

== Route and halts ==
The important halts of the train are :

- Barmer
- Balotra
- Jodhpur Junction
- Merta Road Junction
- Jaipur Junction
- Bharatpur Junction
- Agra Fort
- Kanpur Central
- Prayagraj Junction
- Pt. Deen Dayal Upadhyay Junction
- Patna Junction
- Barauni Junction
- Katihar Junction
- New Jalpaiguri Junction
- New Cooch Behar
- New Alipurduar
- New Bongaigaon Junction
- Barpeta Road
- Rangiya Junction
- Kamakhya Junction
- Guwahati Junction

== Coach composite ==
The train consists rake of 22 LHB coaches :

- 1 AC II Tier
- 3 AC III Tier
- 12 Sleeper Coaches
- 3 General
- 2 EoG cum Luggage car
- 1 Pantry Car

== Traction ==
As the route is yet to be fully electrified, it is hauled by a Bhagat Ki Kothi Loco Shed based WDP-4 / WDP-4B / WDP-4D diesel locomotives from Barmer upto Agra Fort handing over to a Jhansi Loco Shed based WAP-4 electric locomotive for the remainder of the journey until Guwahati.

== Rake sharing ==
The train is attached to 15633/15634 Bikaner - Guwahati Express at Merta Road Junction.

== See also ==
- Barmer railway station
- Guwahati railway station
- Bikaner - Guwahati Express
