= Changsari railway station =

Railway station in Assam

Changsari Railway Station
- Indian Railways logo

General information
- Location: Changsari; India
- Coordinates: 26°15′35″N 91°41′35″E
- Elevation: 54 metres (177 ft)
- System: Indian Railways
- Owner: Indian Railways
- Operator: Northeast Frontier Railway

Construction
- Structure type: Standard on ground
- Parking: Yes
- Cycle facilities: Yes

Other information
- Status: Functioning
- Station code: CGS
- Zone(s): Northeast Frontier Railway zone
- Division(s): Rangiya
Location
- Location within Assam Location within India

Changsari Railway Station is located in the northern part of Guwahati town. It belongs to the Rangiya division of Northeast Frontier Railway. Nearby neighbourhood stations are Baihata railway station, Agthori railway station, Kamakhya railway station and Guwahati railway station.

== Trains ==
Several passenger and inter-city trains stop in this station, some of them are Alipur Duar Jn-Guwahati Passenger, Guwahati-New Bongaigaon Jn Manas Rhino Passenger, New Bongaigaon Jn-Guwahati Manas Rhino Passenger, Rangiya–Silchar Express, New Bongaigaon Jn-Guwahati Passenger, Guwahati-New Bongaigaon Jn Passenger etc.

== See also ==
- Rangiya railway station
