= Dhupguri railway station =

Railway Station in West Bengal, India

DHUPGURI
- Indian Railway logo

General information
- Location: Dhupguri station road NH 27 Dhupguri, Ph : 03563-250056, Dist - Jalpaiguri State: West Bengal; India
- Coordinates: 26.5821°N 89.0051°E
- Elevation: 77 metres (253 ft)
- System: Indian Railways Station
- Owner: Indian Railways
- Operator: Northeast Frontier Railway zone
- Lines: Barauni–Guwahati line, New Jalpaiguri–New Bongaigaon section
- Platforms: 3
- Tracks: 5 (broad gauge)
- Connections: Siliguri jalpaiguri gairkata coochbehar bus connectivity

Construction
- Structure type: At grade
- Parking: Available
- Cycle facilities: Yes

Other information
- Status: Functioning
- Station code: DQG
- Zone(s): Northeast Frontier Railway zone
- Division(s): Alipurduar

History
- Opened: 1/1/1881 (145 years ago )
- Electrified: 21 February 2021

Passengers
- 3000+
Location
- Location within West Bengal Location within India

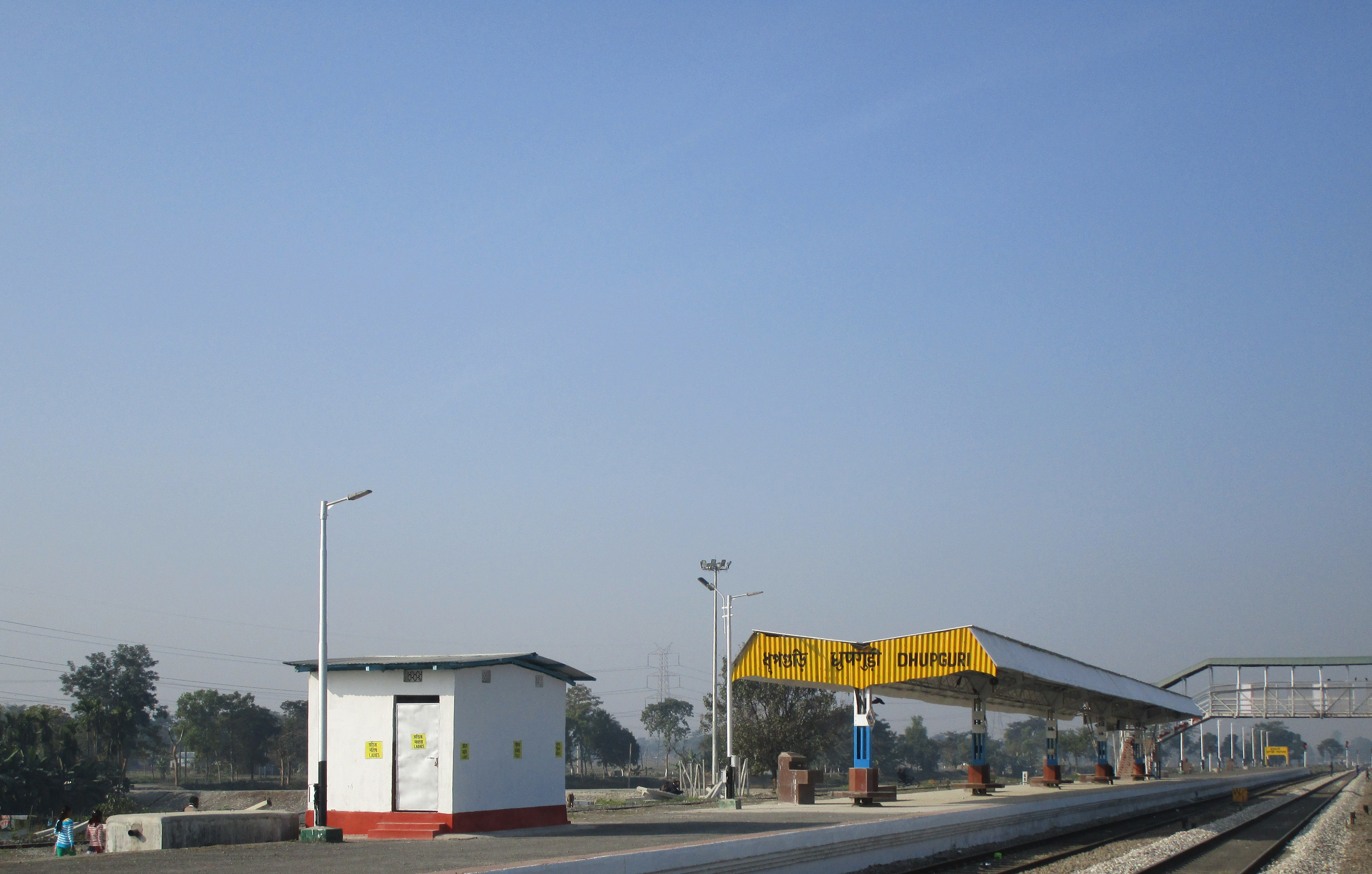
Platform of Dhupaguri Railway Station in Jalpaiguri district

Dhupguri Railway Station is one of the major railway station between New Jalpaiguri & New Cooch Behar which serves the city of Dhupguri in Jalpaiguri district of West Bengal. The station lies on the New Jalpaiguri–New Bongaigaon section of Barauni–Guwahati line of Northeast Frontier Railway. The station lies on Alipurduar railway division.

== Trains ==
No of halting trains: 44

=== Major trains ===
- Silchar–Coimbatore Superfast Express
- Thiruvananthapuram - Silchar Aronai Superfast Express
- Lokmanya Tilak Terminus - Dibrugarh Express
- Kamakhya–Shri Mata Vaishno Devi Katra Express
- Guwahati - Howrah Saraighat Superfast Express
- Dibrugarh - Lalgarh Avadh Assam Express
- Lokmanya Tilak Terminus – Guwahati Express
- Guwahati - Sir M. Visvesvaraya Terminal, Kaziranga Superfast Express
- Chennai Tambaram - Silghat Town Nagaon Express
- Guwahati - Jammu Tawi Amarnath Express
- Jammu - Guwahati Lohit Express
- New Tinsukia–Tambaram Express
- Sealdah–Sabroom Kanchanjunga Express
- Sealdah–Silchar Kanchenjunga Express
- Dibrugarh - Howrah Kamrup Express via Guwahati
- Dibrugarh – Howrah Kamrup Express Via Rangapara North
- Sealdah - New Alipurdiar Teesta Torsha Express
- Delhi - Kamakhya Brahmaputra Mail
- Sealdah - Bamanhat Uttar Banga Express
- New Jalpaiguri - Guwahati Express
- New Jalpaiguri - Bongaigaon Express

== See also ==
- North Eastern Railway Connectivity Project
- North Western Railway zone
