= Bijni railway station =

Railway station in Assam, India

General information
- Location: Rati ram road, Bijni , pin - 783390, Dist- Chirang (B.T.A.D) State: Assam; India
- Coordinates: 26.4979°N 90.7078°E
- Elevation: 54 metres (177 ft)
- System: Indian Railways Station
- Owner: Indian Railways
- Operator: Northeast Frontier Railway zone
- Lines: Barauni–Guwahati line, New Bongaigaon–Guwahati section
- Platforms: 2
- Tracks: 3 (broad gauge)

Construction
- Structure type: At grade
- Parking: Available

Other information
- Status: Functioning
- Station code: BJF
- Zone(s): Northeast Frontier Railway zone
- Division(s): Rangiya
Location
- Location within Assam Location within India

Bijni railway station serves the town of Bijni, Chirang district in the Indian state of Assam. The station code is BJF and lies on the New Bongaigaon–Guwahati section of Barauni–Guwahati line under Northeast Frontier Railway. This station falls under Rangiya railway division.

== Trains ==
Following major trains are available from Bijni railway station:

- Chennai Tambaram - Silghat Town Nagaon Express
- Kamakhya–Anand Vihar Terminal North East Express
- Kamakhya - Delhi Junction Brahmaputra Mail
- Dibrugarh - Howrah Kamrup Express (via Guwahati)
- New Jalpaiguri - Guwahati Express
- Alipurduar–Lumding Intercity Express
