= Gossaigaon Hat railway station =

Railway station in Assam, India

GOSSAIGAON HAT
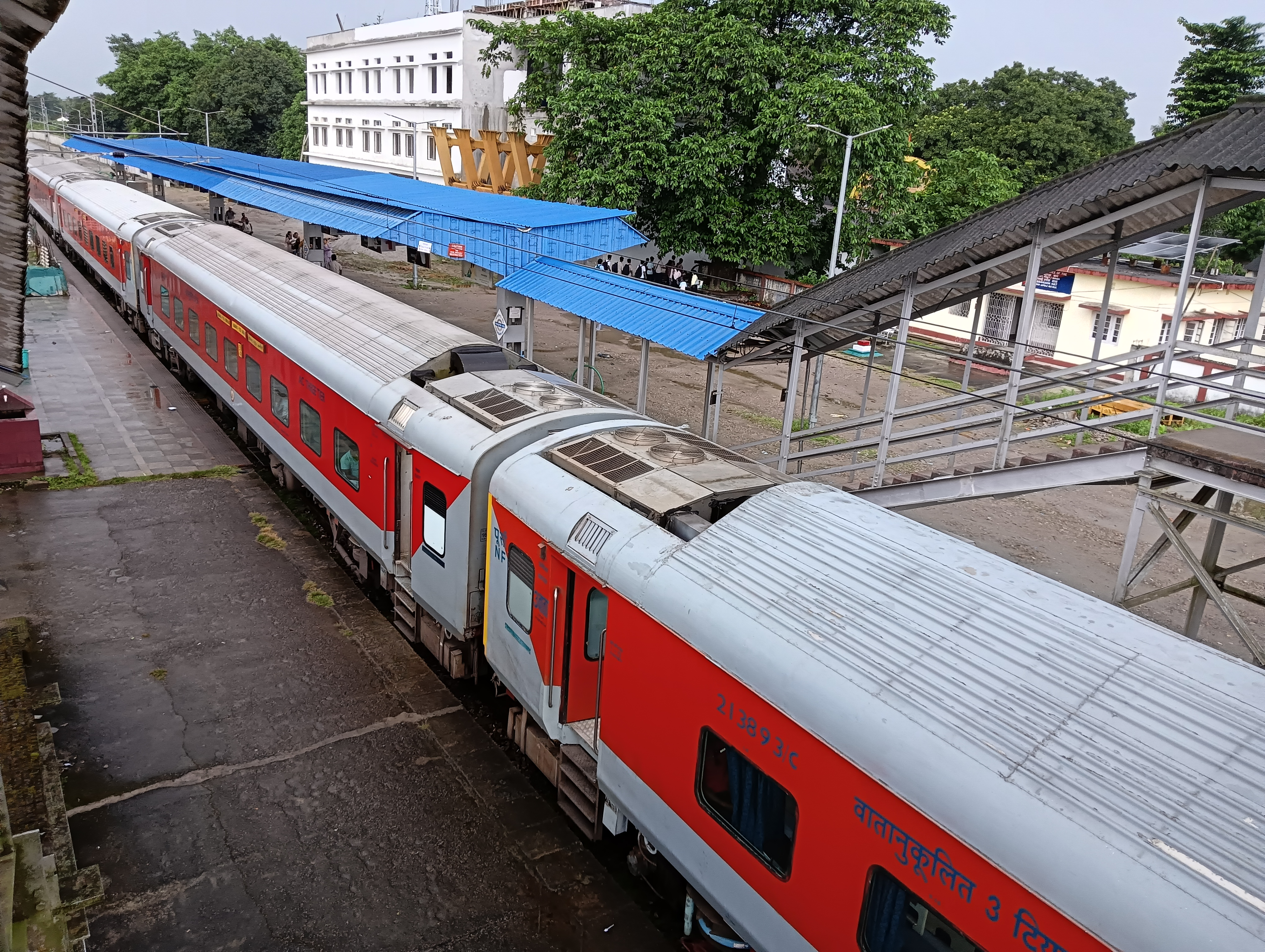

General information
- Location: Gossaigaon, Dist - Kokrajhar (B.T.A.D.), Pin; 783360 State: Assam; India
- Coordinates: 26.25°N 89.59°E
- Elevation: 49 metres (161 ft)
- System: Express train, Passenger train & Freight train station
- Owner: Indian Railways
- Operator: Northeast Frontier Railway Zone
- Lines: Barauni–Guwahati line, New Jalpaiguri–New Bongaigaon section
- Platforms: 2 (more under construction)
- Tracks: 5 (broad gauge)
- Connections: E-rickshaw, Auto-Rickshaw

Construction
- Structure type: At grade
- Parking: Available
- Cycle facilities: Available

Other information
- Status: Functioning
- Station code: GOGH
- Zone(s): Northeast Frontier Railway zone
- Division(s): Alipurduar

History
- Rebuilt: Under Amrit Bharat Station Scheme
- Electrified: Yes

Services
Preceding station	Indian Railways	Following station
Srirampur Assam towards New Jalpaiguri Junction	Northeast Frontier Railway zone New Jalpaiguri–New Bongaigaon section	Chautara towards New Bongaigaon Junction
Location
- Location within Assam Location within India

Gossaigaon Hat (GOGH) railway station serves the town of Gossaigaon, Kokrajhar district in the Indian state of Assam. The station lies on the New Jalpaiguri–New Bongaigaon section of Barauni–Guwahati line of Northeast Frontier Railway. This station falls under Alipurduar railway division.

== Major Trains ==
1. (22227/22228) New Jalpaiguri - Guwahati Vande Bharat Express
2. (15675/15676) New Jalpaiguri - Guwahati Intercity Express
3. (15703/15704) New Jalpaiguri - Bongaigaon Express(BG Passenger)
4. (15673/15674) Kamakhya - Charlapalli Amrit Bharat Express
5. (12505/12506) Kamakhya - Anand Vihar Terminal Northeast Superfast Express
6. (15657/15658) Kamakhya - Delhi Brahmaputra Mail
7. (13175/13176) Sealdah - Silchar Kanchanjunga Express
8. (13173/13174) Sealdah - Sabroom Kanchanjunga Express
9. (15959/15960) Howrah - Dibrugarh Kamrup Express via Guwahati
10. (15629/15630) Tambaram - Silghat Town Nagaon Express
11. (15769/15770) Alipurduar Jn. - Mariani Intercity Express
12. (15753/15754) Alipurduar Jn. - Guwahati Sifung Express

== Nearest Airports ==
The nearest airports to Gossaigaon Hat railway station are:-

1. Rupsi Airport 45 kilometres
2. Cooch Behar Airport 68 kilometres
3. Lokpriya Gopinath Bordoloi International Airport, Guwahati 258 kilometres

== Gallery ==
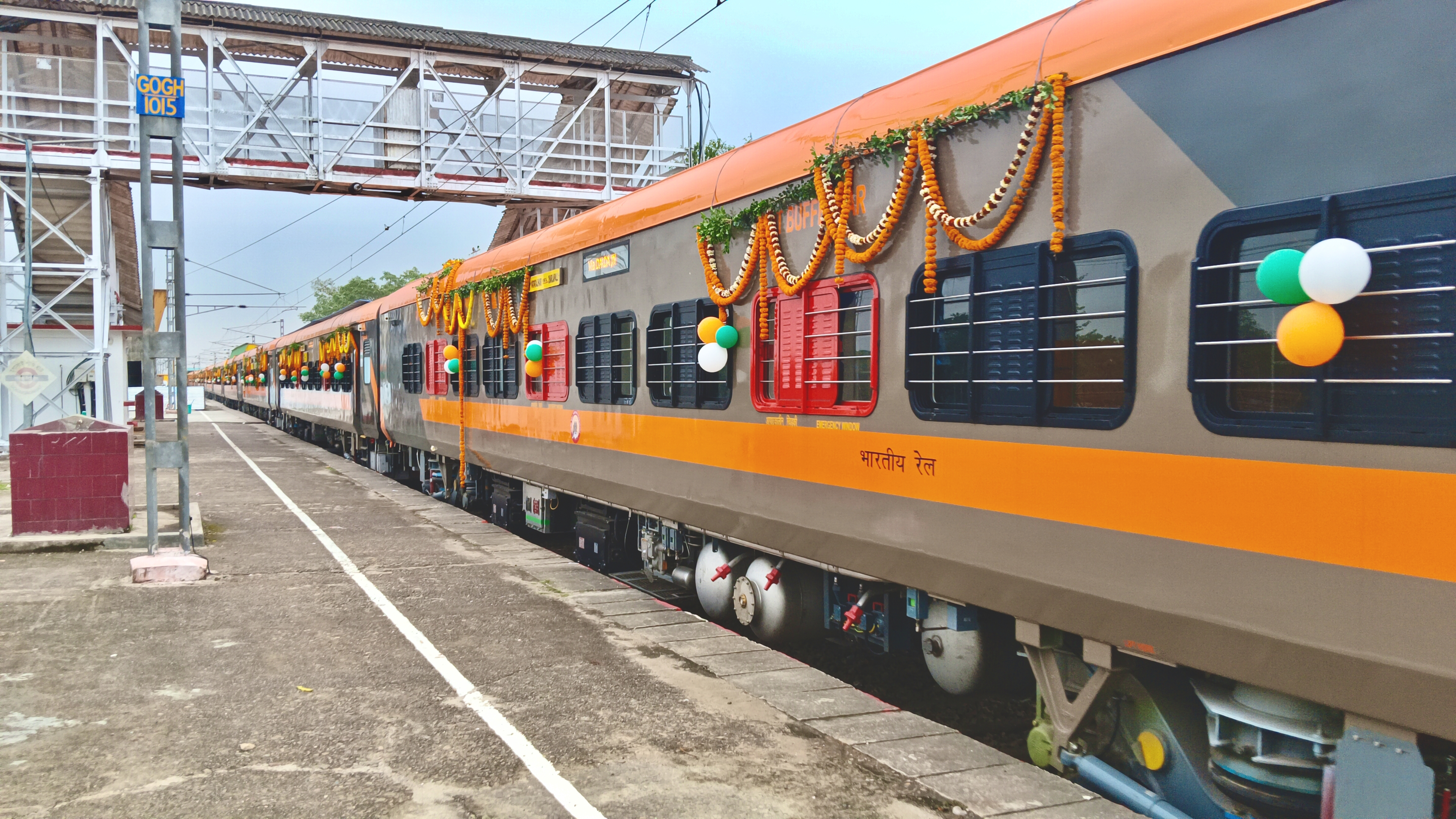
Kamakhya - Charlapalli Amrit Bharat inaugural Special standing at Platform number 1

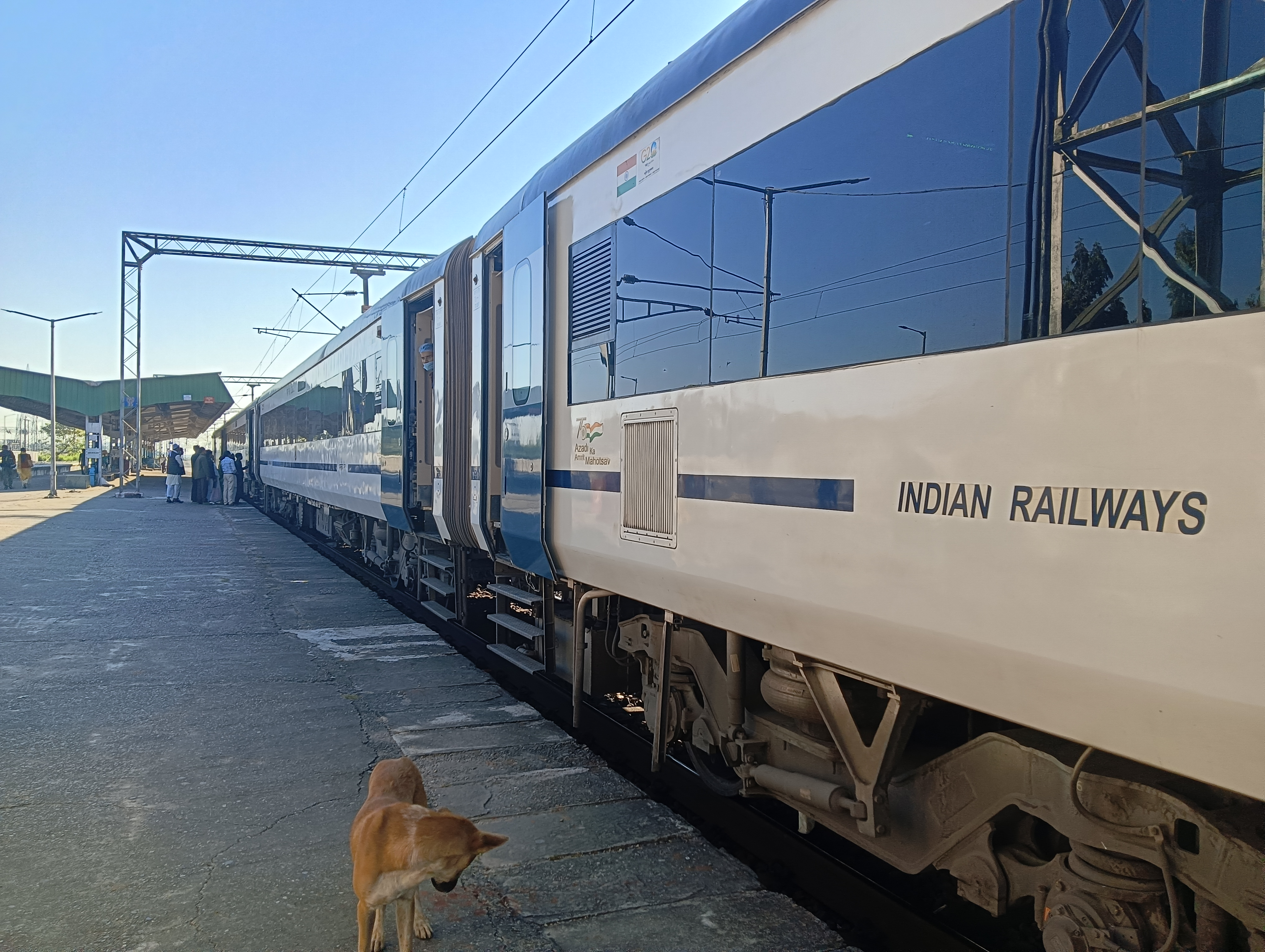
22227 Vande Bharat Exp Standing on platform 2 at GossaigaonHat

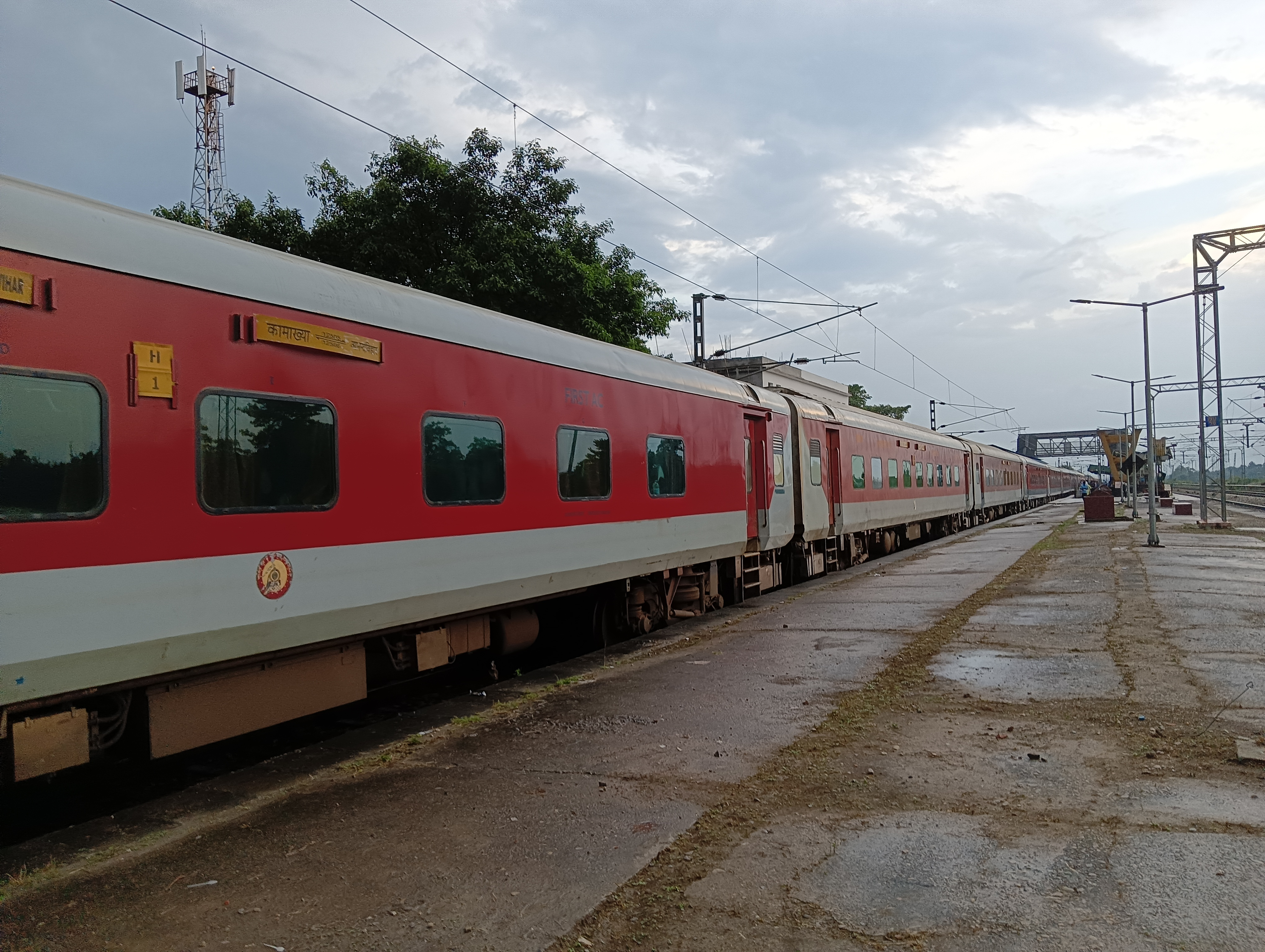
12505 DN North East SF Express Standing on Platform 1 at GossaigaonHat

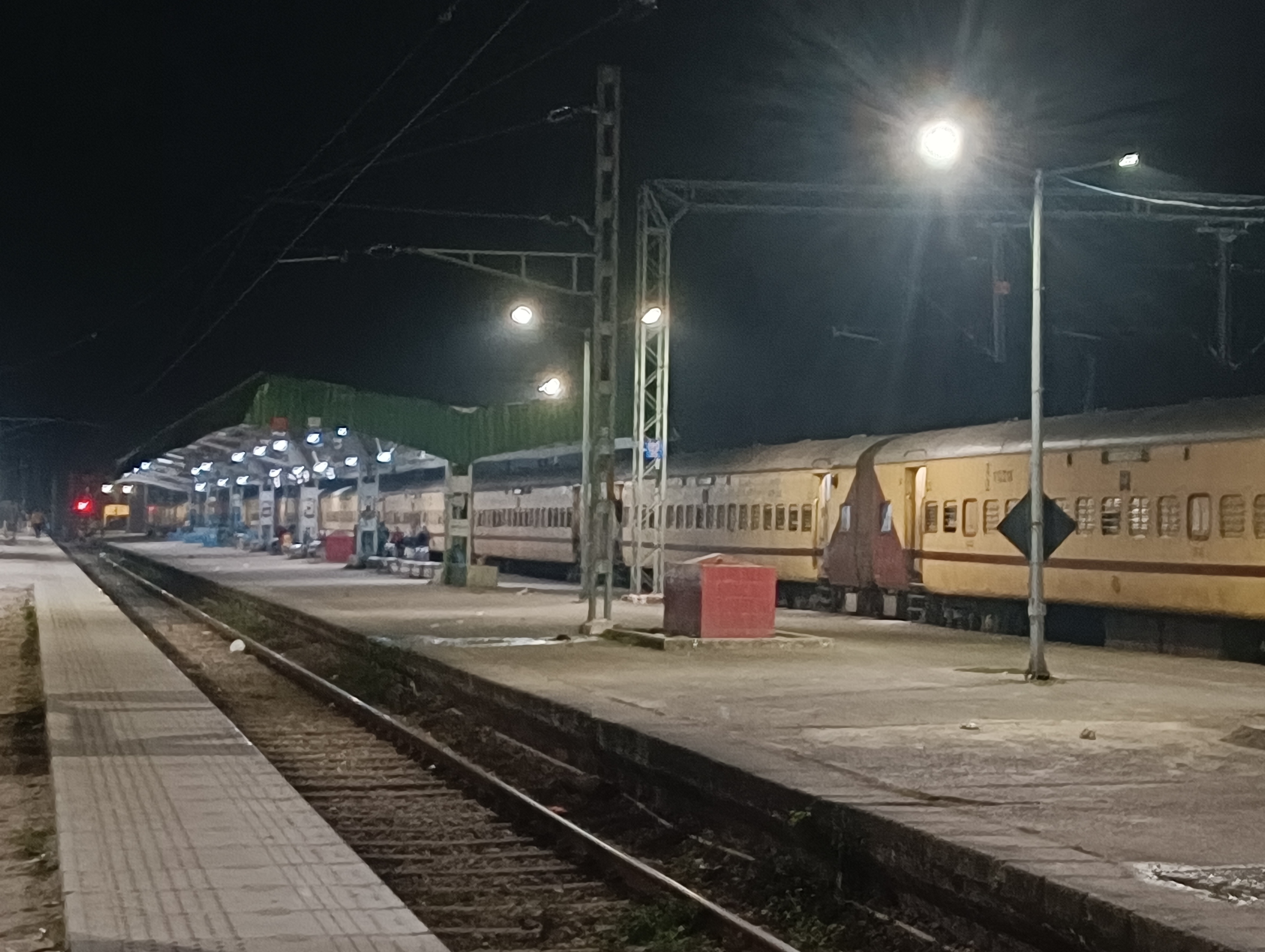
13175 Silchar Kanchanjunga Exp Standing on Platform 2 at GossaigaonHat with old ICF rake

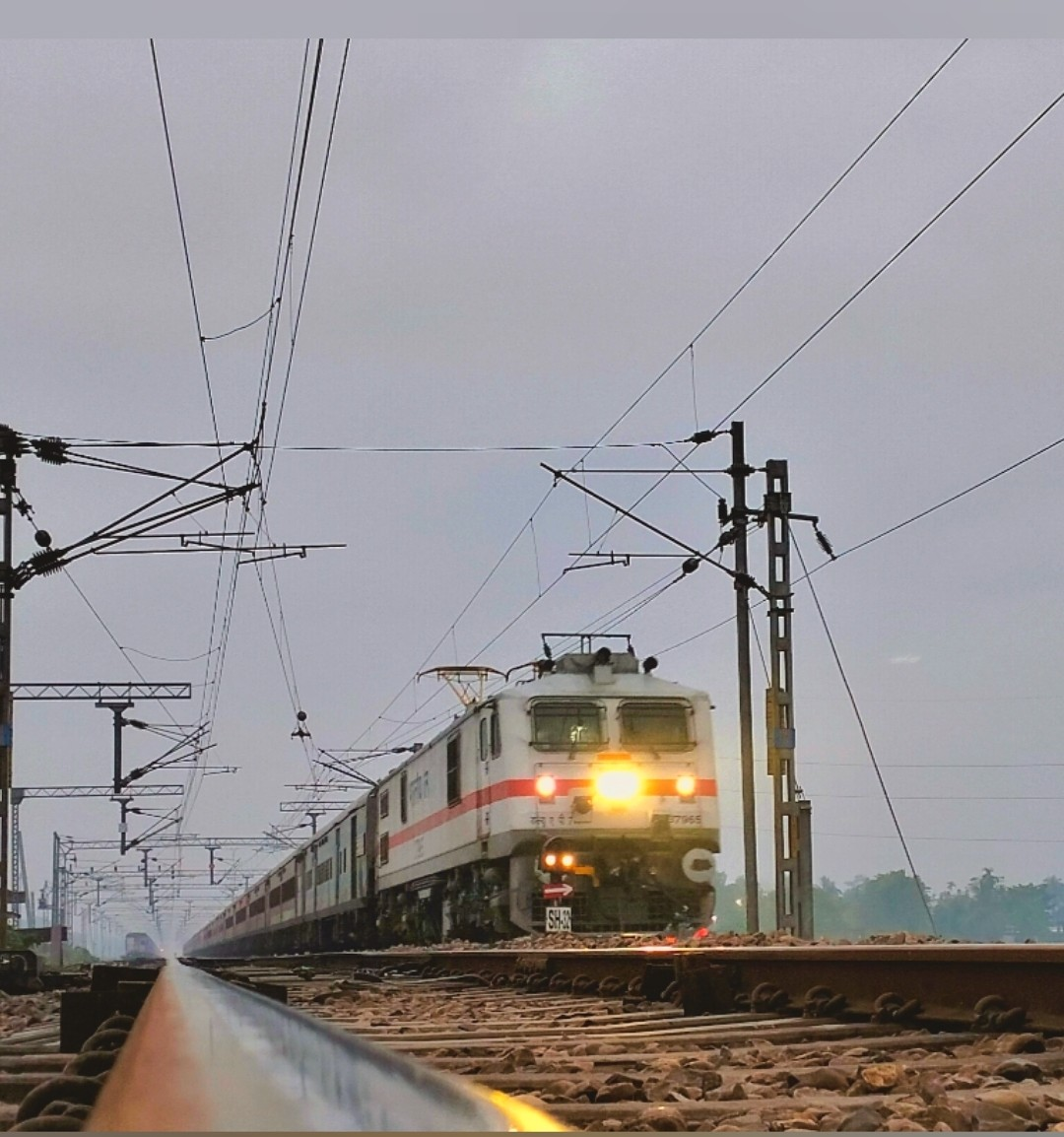
Portrait of 12506 UP Northeast SF Express

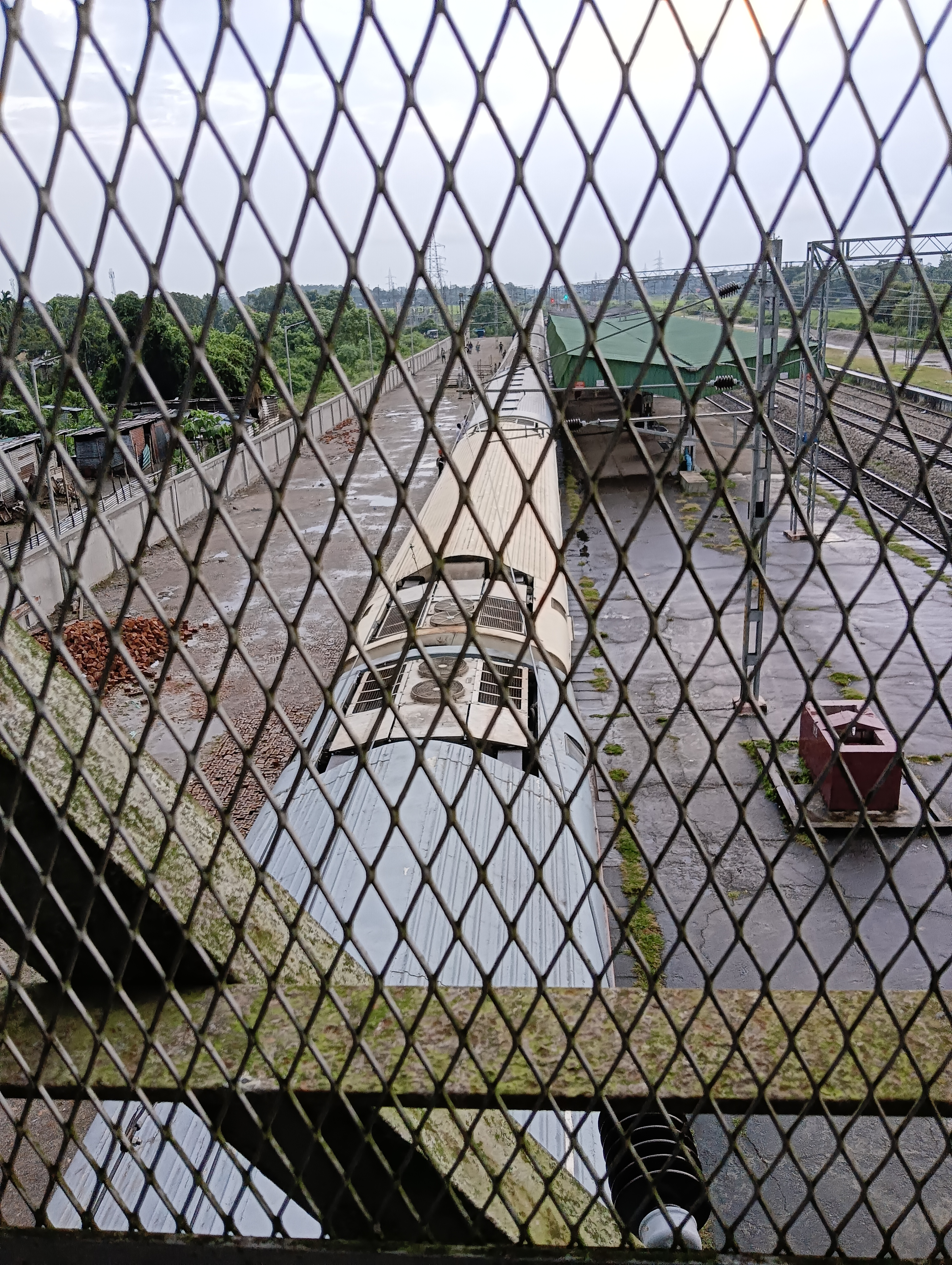
View from Foot-Over bridge

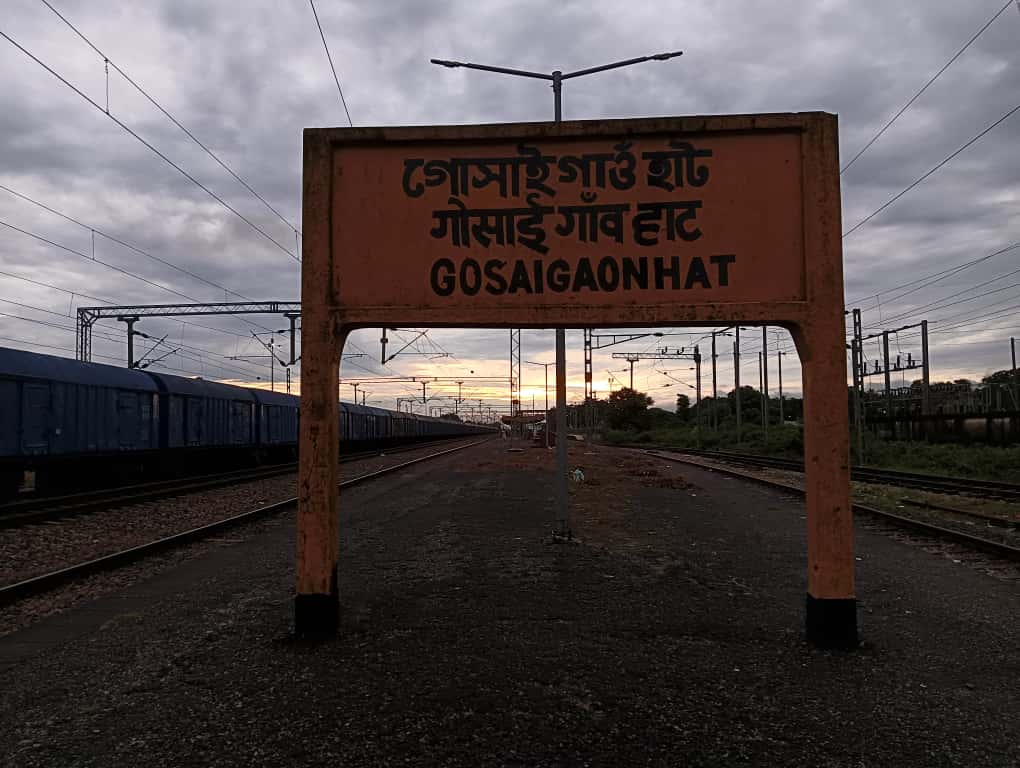
