= Barpeta Road =

- Town
- Nicknames: Commercial capital of Western Assam
- Location in Assam, India Barpeta Road (India)
- Coordinates: 26.50°N 90.97°E
- Country: India
- State: Assam
- District: Barpeta

Government
  - Body: Barpeta Road Municipality Board

Population (2011)
  - Total: 35,571

Languages
  - Official: Standard Assamese
  - Native: Barpetia Assamese
- Time zone: UTC+5:30 (IST)
- PIN: 781315
- Telephone code: +91 03666
- ISO 3166 code: IN-AS
- Vehicle registration: AS 15

Barpeta Road or Athiyabari as known earlier is a town and Commercial City of Assam a municipal board in Barpeta district in the state of Assam, India.

== Geography ==
The town is 165 feet (50 meters) above the sea level.

== Demography ==
Barpeta Road is a Municipal Board city situated in Barnagar Circle of Barpeta district. The Barpeta Road city is divided into 10 wards for which elections are held every 5 years. As per the Population Census 2011, there are a total of 7,484 families residing in the Barpeta Road city. The total population of Barpeta Road is 35,571 out of which 18,489 are males and 17,082 are females thus the Average Sex Ratio of Barpeta Road is 924.

The population of Children of age 0–6 years in Barpeta Road city is 3213 which is 9% of the total population. There are 1675 male children and 1538 female children between the ages of 0–6 years. Thus as per the Census 2011, the child sex ratio of Barpeta Road is 918 which is less than the Average Sex Ratio (924).

As per the Census 2011, the literacy rate of Barpeta Road is 87.2%. Thus Barpeta Road has a higher literacy rate compared to 63.8% of Barpeta district. The male literacy rate is 91.52% and the female literacy rate is 82.58% in Barpeta Road.

== Places of attraction ==
Declared a national park in 1990, Manas National Park is located in the Himalayan foothills where it has unique biodiversity and scenic landscapes. It is one of the first reserves included in the Tiger Reserve network under Project Tiger in 1973. Covering an area of 2837 km^{2}. Manas River flows through the park with a unique blending of dense jungles and grass-land, harbours the largest number of protected species of India including tiger, leopard, civet, elephants, buffalo, pygmy hog, golden langur, Assam roof turtle, and the Bengal florican.

This park is included as a site of international importance under UNESCO's World Heritage Convention in 1988 as well as the Biosphere Reserve in 1989. There are as many as 60 species of mammals, 312 birds, 42 reptiles, 7 amphibians, 54 fishes and more than 100 species of insects. The park has the unique feature of having the most number of endangered species found in India. The place can be reached by road from Barpeta Road (20 km) connecting National Highway No-31 which connects the rest of India. The forest lodges are situated inside the park at Mathanguri which lies at a distance of 40 km from Barpeta Road. Visitors are to obtain necessary permission for entry into the park at the office of Field Director Manas Tiger Reserve, Barpeta Road. The best time to visit the park is from November to April.

== Sports ==
Barpeta Road is a very active town when it comes to sports. It has given birth to several sports persons representing the state. The natives are very good at football. The youths are more drawn towards taekwondo (a Korean martial art). There is a stadium named Barpeta Road Stadium for playing. Moreover, various intercity events are held by St Joseph's High School, St Mary's High School, Marian School and G.N. Bordoloi Memorial High School encouraging sports among the masses.

== Transport ==
The town lies beside National Highway 27. The town is at a distance of 135 kilometres by road from Guwahati, the largest city in the region. By railway, the distance is 113 kilometres, covered in two to three hours. The nearest airport is Gauhati Airport, which is at a distance of 135 kilometres. The town is well connected through regular buses and trains to all the parts of the country.

Direct train service from Barpeta Road railway station connects the town to Trivandrum, Ernakulam, Bangalore, Chennai in southern India; Mumbai, Barmer, Jodhpur, Bikaner in western India; New Delhi, Kanpur, Lucknow in central India; and Kolkata, Puri, Dibrugarh in eastern India. The town is at a distance of 21 kilometres from the district headquarters of the Barpeta district. The town is the gateway to Manas National Park. The town is one of the most important places in Western Assam and is an ideal place for trade and commerce. The town is referred to be the commercial capital of Western Assam.
