= Brahmaputra Mail =

Train in India

Overview
- Service type: Express
- Status: Permanently cancelled between Dibrugarh and Kamakhya Junction on 19 December 2020; 5 years ago
- First service: 1 October 1974; 52 years ago
- Current operator: Northeast Frontier Railway

Route
- Termini: Kamakhya (KYQ); Old Delhi (DLI)
- Stops: 41
- Distance travelled: 2,035 km (1,264 mi)
- Average journey time: 37 hours 35 minutes for 15657 & 35 hrs 55 mins for 15658
- Service frequency: Daily
- Train number: 15657 / 15658

On-board services
- Classes: AC 1st Class, AC 2 Tier, AC 3 Tier, Sleeper class, General Unreserved
- Seating arrangements: Yes
- Sleeping arrangements: Yes
- Catering facilities: Available
- Observation facilities: Large windows
- Baggage facilities: Available
- Other facilities: Below the seats

Technical
- Rolling stock: LHB coach
- Track gauge: 1,676 mm (5 ft 6 in); Broad Gauge
- Operating speed: 55.27 km/h (34 mph) average including halts.
Route map
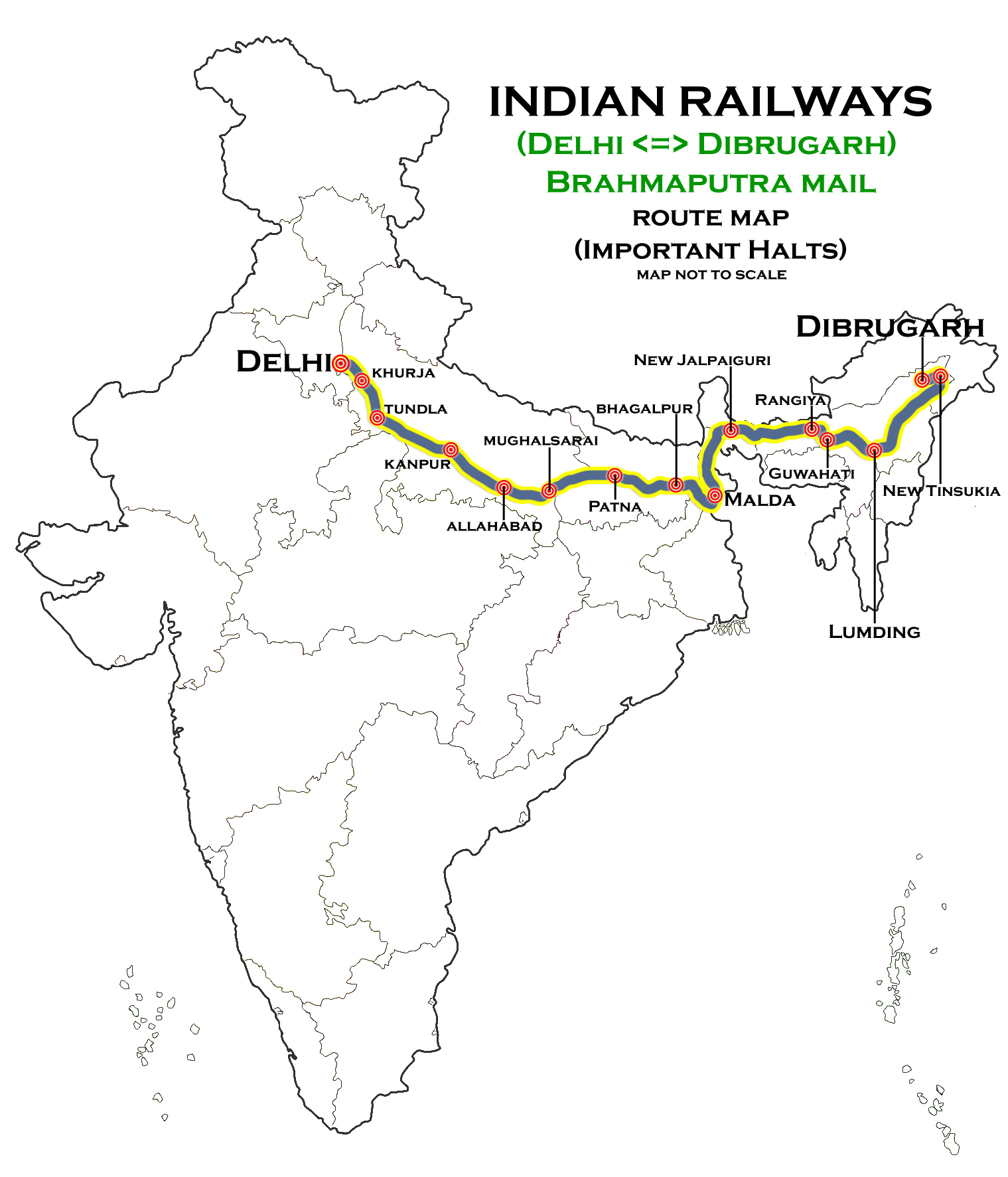

The 15657 / 15658 Brahmaputra Mail is a daily train that connects Old Delhi with Kamakhya in Assam. Introduced in 1972 after the construction of the rail section of the Farakka Barrage, the train originally ran as the Tinsukia Mail between Delhi Junction railway station and New Bongaigaon railway station, later to Guwahati, with onward metre-gauge connection by a train of the same name numbered as 7Up and 8Dn to Guwahati and Tinsukia in the Indian state of Assam. The train was renamed to Brahmaputra Mail after the successful gauge conversion of the Guwahati–Dibrugarh metre-gauge lines to broad gauge in 1992. After Broad gauge reached Dibrugarh Town in 1992, timings were speeded up & had good runs till 2020. But with effect from 20/12/2020 this train is running between Kamakhya Junction (KYQ) & Old Delhi (DLI) & is permanently cancelled between Kamakhya Junction & Dibrugarh due to unknown reasons. Demands to restore the train till Dibrugarh is not being heeded for.

== Services ==
Originally ran as 155 dn by 156 up it was originally started by Northeast Frontier Railway which is called NFR in short. Later on, the primary maintenance was transferred to the Delhi Division of the Northern Railway and ran under the numbers 14056up by 14055 dn. The train recently got LHB rake and the primary maintenance went back to NFR with Dibrugarh being the maintenance station. Once the pride of NFR with neon lights in its first class compartments and has eight cushioned sleeper class coaches in the 1970s, the train went to a sharp decline both in priority and facilities with conditioning of its rake worsening. However, with the new LHB rake trying to get its lost glory back. The up train belongs to Northeast Frontier Railway zone. Northeast Frontier Railways decided it will be running as 15955/15956 Brahmaputra Mail from 9 December 2019.

== Coach composition ==
The train has both AC and non-AC class of accommodation. The composition of this train is

LOCO	HCP	SLR	UR	UR	S6	S4	S3	S2	S1	PC	A2	A1	B7	B6	B5	B4	B3	B2	B1	EOG

== Traction ==
As the route is fully electrified, it is hauled by a Ghaziabad Loco Shed-based WAP-5 / WAP-7 or Tughlakabad Loco Shed-based WAP-7 electric locomotive on its entire journey. Earlier during non electrified days, Siliguri Junction railway station shed WDP-4 or New Guwahati shed Twin WDM-3 Diesel Locomotive used to haul this train from Kiul to Dibrugarh

== Route and halts ==
- Kamakhya
- Rangiya Junction
- Nalbari
- Barpeta Road
- Bijni
- Bongaigaon
- New Bongaigaon Junction
- Kokrajhar
- Fakiragram Junction
- Gossaigaon Hat
- New Alipurduar
- New Cooch Behar Junction
- Falakata
- Dhupguri
- Jalpaiguri Road
- New Jalpaiguri (Siliguri)
- Kishanganj
- Barsoi Junction
- Samsi
- Malda Town
- New Farakka Junction
- Barharwa Junction
- Sahibganj Junction
- Kahalgaon
- Bhagalpur Junction
- Sultanganj
- Jamalpur Junction
- Abhaipur
- Kiul Junction
- Mokama Junction
- Patna Sahib
- Patna Junction
- Ara Junction
- Buxar
- Dildarnagar Junction
- Pandit Deen Dayal Upadhyaya Junction
- Mirzapur
- Prayagraj Junction
- Kanpur Central
- Shikohabad Junction
- Tundla Junction
- Aligarh Junction
- Ghaziabad Junction
- Old Delhi Junction.

== Trivia ==
- This is one of the oldest-running trains of this zone. This train is known for its number of defense personnel using this train.
- This train was also involved in three major railway disasters in Indian history. One was the bombing of the train between Kokrajhar and New Bongaigaon in December 1996 by Bodo Militants, and second was the Gaisal Rail Disaster, a head-on collision between Avadh Assam Express and Brahmaputra Mail. The third one occurred on November 22, 1985, when this passenger train (then known as Tinsukia Mail ) and a freight train collided in the eastern state of West Bengal, at Dhupguri railroad station, about 750 miles east of New Delhi killing at least one person and injuring more than 300 others, seven seriously. Three to Five cars of the passenger train derailed in the accident.
