= Nalbari railway station =

Railway station in Assam, India

Nalbari

General information
- Location: Nalbari; India
- Coordinates: 26.4507°N 91.4391°E
- Elevation: 53 metres (174 ft)
- System: Indian Railways junction station
- Owner: Indian Railways
- Operator: Northeast Frontier Railway

Construction
- Structure type: At grade
- Parking: Yes
- Cycle facilities: Yes

Other information
- Status: Functioning
- Station code: NLV
- Zone(s): Northeast Frontier
- Division(s): Rangiya
Location
- Location within Assam Location within India

Nalbari railway station is located in the northern part of Nalbari town. The station code is NLV. It has three platforms. It belongs to the Northeast Frontier Railway, Rangiya railway division. The nearby neighbourhood stations are Ghograpar and Kaithalkuchi.

== Trains ==
Several express trains stop at this station, some of them are Alipur Duar Jn-Guwahati Passenger, Alipurduar–Lumding Intercity Express, Guwahati-New Bongaigaon Junction Manas Rhino Passenger, Kamrup Express, Kanchanjungha Express, New Jalpaiguri - Guwahati Express, Dibrugarh - Deogarh Express and the Brahmaputra Mail.

From February 2026, the station gets a stoppage for Rajdhani Express.

== See also ==
- Rangiya railway station
