= Lokmanya Tilak Terminus–Guwahati Express =

Indian Railways express train

Overview
- Service type: Express
- Current operator: Northeast Frontier Railway zone

Route
- Termini: Lokmanya Tilak Terminus; Guwahati
- Stops: 53
- Distance travelled: 2,736 km (1,700 mi)
- Average journey time: 53 hours
- Service frequency: Bi-Weekly
- Train number: 15647 / 15648

On-board services
- Classes: AC 2 tier, AC 3 tier, sleeper class, general unreserved
- Seating arrangements: Yes
- Sleeping arrangements: Yes
- Catering facilities: yes

Technical
- Rolling stock: LHB coach
- Track gauge: 1,676 mm (5 ft 6 in)
- Operating speed: 50 km/h (31 mph)

The 15647/48 Lokmanya Tilak Terminus–Guwahati Express is an Express train belonging to Indian Railways Northeast Frontier Railway zone that runs between Lokmanya Tilak Terminus and Guwahati in India.

It operates as train number 15647 from Lokmanya Tilak Terminus to Guwahati and as train number 15648 in the reverse direction, serving the states of Maharashtra, Madhya Pradesh, Uttar Pradesh, Bihar, Jharkhand, West Bengal & Assam.

== Coaches ==
The 15647 / 48 Lokmanya Tilak Terminus–Guwahati Express has one AC 2-tier, four AC 3-tier, 12 sleeper class, three general unreserved & two SLR (seating with luggage rake) coaches. It carries a pantry car.

As is customary with most train services in India, coach composition may be amended at the discretion of Indian Railways depending on demand.

== Service ==
The 15647 Lokmanya Tilak Terminus–Guwahati Express covers the distance of 2,732 km (1,698 mi) in 53 hours 00 mins (52 km/h) and in 53 hours 00 mins as the 15648 Guwahati–Lokmanya Tilak Terminus Express (52 km/h).

As the average speed of the train is lower than 55 km/h (34 mph), as per railway rules, its fare doesn't includes a Superfast surcharge.

== Routing ==
The 15647 / 48 Lokmanya Tilak Terminus–Guwahati Express runs from Lokmanya Tilak Terminus via Kalyan Junction, Bhusaval Junction, Itarsi Junction, Jabalpur Junction, Cheoki Junction, Patna Junction, Malda Town, New Jalpaiguri Junction to Guwahati.

== Traction ==
WAP-7 Locomotive of Electric Loco Shed, Kalyan hauls the train from Lokmanya Tilak Terminus to Guwahati.
