= Srirampur Assam railway station =

Railway Station in Assam, India

Srirampur Assam Railway Station

General information
- Location: Srirampur, Dist - Kokrajhar (B.T.A.D.), Pin -783361 State: Assam; India
- Coordinates: 26.4334°N 89.9025°E
- Elevation: 49 metres (161 ft)
- System: Indian Railways Station
- Owner: Indian Railways
- Operator: Northeast Frontier Railway zone
- Lines: Barauni–Guwahati line, New Jalpaiguri–New Bongaigaon section
- Platforms: 2
- Tracks: 3 (broad gauge)

Construction
- Parking: Available

Other information
- Status: Functioning
- Station code: SRPB
- Zone(s): Northeast Frontier Railway zone

History
- Opened: 1900-1910
- Former names: The railway personnel has visited the area and discussion is going to take steps to make coach factory over here in Srirampur Assam. It will be joyful moment for Btr? people in coming days. If the coach factory has been establish over here.
Location
- Location within Assam Location within India

Srirampur Assam Railway Station serves the town of Srirampur which lies in the border of West Bengal-Assam, in Kokrajhar district in the Indian state of Assam. The station lies on the New Jalpaiguri–New Bongaigaon section of Barauni–Guwahati line of Northeast Frontier Railway. This station falls under Alipurduar railway division.
