= Barpeta Road railway station =

Railway station in Assam

Barpeta Road

General information
- Location: Mission Road, Station Road, Barpeta Road Barpeta, Assam; India
- Coordinates: 26.5020°N 90.9647°E
- Elevation: 49 metres (161 ft)
- System: Indian Railways station
- Owner: Indian Railways
- Platforms: 2
- Tracks: 4
- Connections: Auto stand

Construction
- Structure type: At grade
- Parking: Yes
- Cycle facilities: No
- Accessible: Yes (24 hours)

Other information
- Status: Double-line electrified
- Station code: BPRD
- Zone(s): Northeast Frontier
- Division(s): Rangiya
- Website: www.indianrail.gov.in

History
- Electrified: 2023
- Former names: Tatikuchi Railway Station

Passengers
- 20k+ per day

Services
Waiting Room, Food & Drink, CCTV, Free Wifi etc.
Location
- Location within Assam Location within India

Barpeta Road railway station, is located in the Barpeta district of Assam, India. It is a railway station that serves the town of Barpeta Road and the surrounding areas. The station is part of the Northeast Frontier Railway zone and is connected to various major cities and towns in India through the Indian Railways network. The station consists of 2 platforms and 3 tracks. This Railway Station was constructed in British Era.

== Trains ==
Major Trains:

- New Jalpaiguri–Guwahati Vande Bharat Express
- Agartala–Anand Vihar Terminal Tejas Rajdhani Express
- Sairang–Anand Vihar Terminal Rajdhani Express
- Silchar-Coimbatore Express
- Guwahati - Sir M. Visvesvaraya Terminal, Bangalore Superfast Express
- Silchar-Thiruvananthapuram Aronai Express
- Lokmanya Tilak Terminus - Dibrugarh Express
- Lokmanya Tilak Terminus–Guwahati Express
- Sealdah–Sabroom Kanchanjunga Express
- Dibrugarh–Gomti Nagar Amrit Bharat Express
- Kamakhya–Rohtak Amrit Bharat Express
- Dibrugarh-Howrah Kamrup Express via Guwahati
- Dibrugarh-Howrah Kamrup Express Via Rangapara North
- Kamakhya - Delhi Junction Brahmaputra Mail
- Kamakhya–Anand Vihar Terminal North East Superfast Express
- Guwahati - Bikaner Express
- Sealdah–Silchar Kanchenjunga Express
- Guwahati - Barmer Express
- Kamakhya - Jodhpur, Bhagat Ki Kothi Express
- Kamakhya - Puri Express (via Adra)
- Dibrugarh - Lalgarh Avadh Assam Express
- Dibrugarh - Deogarh Express
- New Jalpaiguri - Guwahati Express
- Alipurduar–Lumding Intercity Express

== History ==
The station was constructed in the British Era, estimated to have been built in the late 19th or early 20th century. It was initially a small station with just a few tracks and platforms. However, it gradually gained importance as the region developed and more people started using the railway system. During the Second World War, the station was used by the British Army to transport troops and supplies to the eastern front. After independence, the Indian government invested heavily in the development of the railway system in Assam. This led to the expansion of the Barpeta Road railway station, which now has two platforms and three tracks. The station has played a vital role in the economic development of the Barpeta district and the surrounding regions. It has helped to connect the region to the rest of the country and has facilitated the movement of goods and people.

The station was initially known as Tatikuchi, after the nearby village of the same name. However, it was renamed Barpeta Road in 1978 to reflect the growing importance of the town of Barpeta Road.The station has been witness to several important historical events. For example, in 1983, it was visited by the then Prime Minister of India, Indira Gandhi.The station has also been featured in several films and television shows. For example, it was featured in the Bollywood film "Aandhi" (1975).

== Future plans ==
They are trying to:

- Construct a new terminal building: The existing terminal building is small and outdated. A new terminal building would be more spacious and modern, and would provide better facilities for passengers.
- Expand the existing platforms: The existing platforms are too short to accommodate all of the trains that stop at the station. Expanding the platforms would allow more trains to stop at the station and would reduce congestion.
- Develop a railway station complex: The railway station complex could include a shopping mall, a hotel, and other commercial establishments. This would generate revenue for the Indian Railways and would make the railway station a more attractive destination for passengers.
- Improve connectivity to the station: The railway station is currently located on the outskirts of Barpeta Road. Improving connectivity to the station would make it easier for passengers to reach the station. This could be done by building new roads and bridges, or by improving public transportation services.

Also these:

- Make the station more accessible to all passengers: This includes providing facilities for passengers with disabilities and elderly passengers.
- Make the station more environmentally friendly: This could be done by using renewable energy sources and by reducing waste.
