= New Jalpaiguri–Patna Vande Bharat Express =

Mini Vande Bharat Express train route in India

New Jalpaiguri Junction - Patna Junction Vande Bharat Express
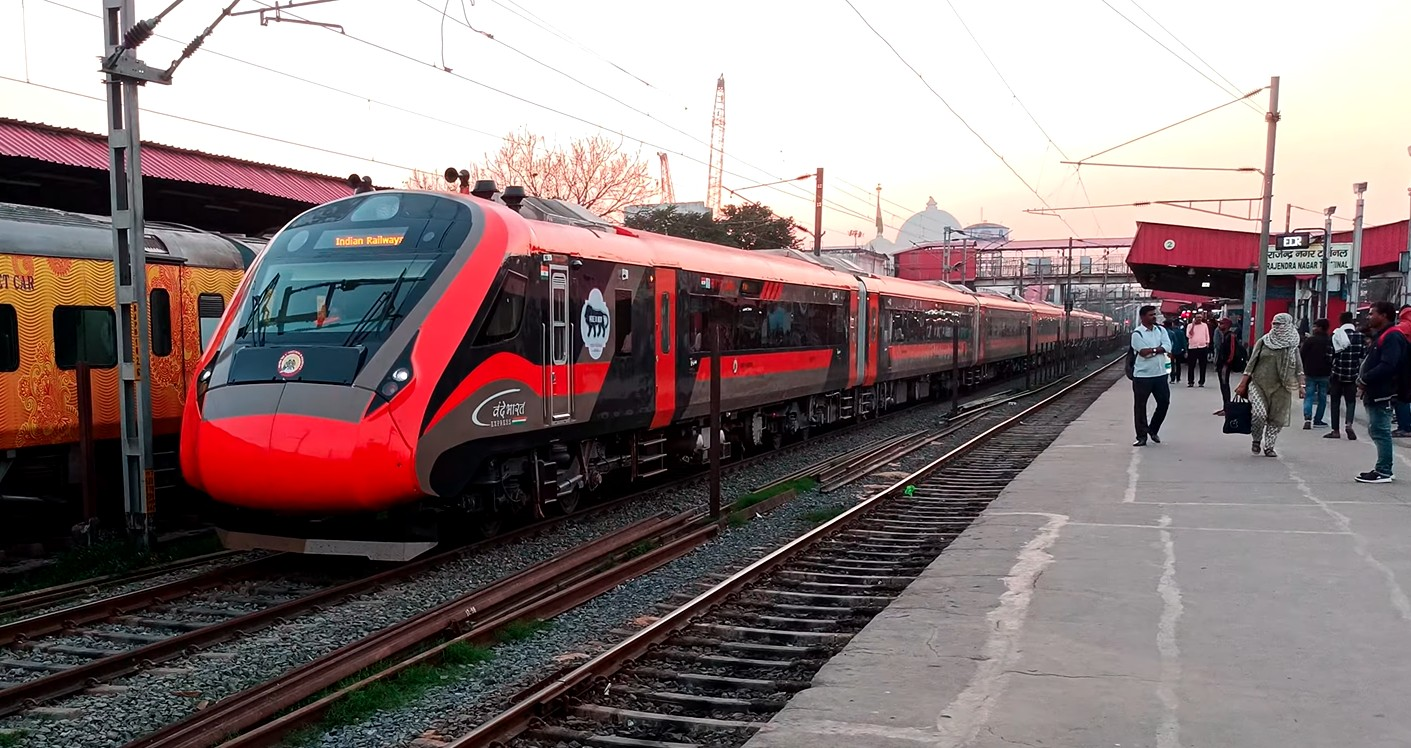
- This Saffron-Grey Mini Vande Bharat Express train on standby at Rajendra Nagar Terminal

Overview
- Service type: Vande Bharat Express
- Locale: West Bengal and Bihar
- First service: 12 March 2024 (Inaugural); 14 March 2024; 20 months ago (Commercial)
- Current operator: North East Frontier Railway (NFR)

Route
- Termini: New Jalpaiguri Junction (NJP); Patna Junction (PNBE)
- Stops: 07
- Distance travelled: 473 km (294 mi)
- Average journey time: 06 hrs 55 mins
- Service frequency: Six days a week (Note: Except Tuesdays)
- Train number: 22233 / 22234
- Lines used: Siliguri–Katihar line; Katihar–Barauni line; Barauni–Mokama line; Asansol–Patna line

On-board services
- Classes: AC Chair Car, AC Executive Chair Car
- Seating arrangements: Airline style; Rotatable seats
- Sleeping arrangements: No
- Catering facilities: On board Catering
- Observation facilities: Large windows in all coaches
- Entertainment facilities: On-board WiFi; Infotainment System; Electric outlets; Reading light; Seat Pockets; Bottle Holder; Tray Table
- Baggage facilities: Overhead racks
- Other facilities: Kavach

Technical
- Rolling stock: Mini Vande Bharat 2.0
- Track gauge: Indian gauge 1,676 mm (5 ft 6 in) broad gauge
- Electrification: 25 kV 50 Hz AC Overhead line
- Operating speed: 68 km/h (42 mph) (Avg.)
- Average length: 192 metres (630 ft) (08 coaches)
- Track owner: Indian Railways
- Rake maintenance: (TBC)

The 22233/22234 New Jalpaiguri - Patna Vande Bharat Express is India's 43rd Vande Bharat Express train, which connects the city of Twin Cities, Siliguri in West Bengal with the capital city Patna in Bihar. This express train was inaugurated by Prime Minister Narendra Modi via video conferencing from Ahmedabad on March 12 2024.

== Overview ==
This train is operated by Indian Railways, connecting New Jalpaiguri Jn, Kishanganj, Barsoi, Katihar, Naugachia, Khagaria, Begusarai, Patna Sahib and Patna Jn. It is operated with train numbers 22233/22234 on 6 days a week basis.

== Rakes ==
It is the forty-first 2nd Generation and twenty-seventh Mini Vande Bharat 2.0 Express train which was designed and manufactured by the Integral Coach Factory at Perambur, Chennai under the Make in India Initiative.

== Service ==
The 22233/22234 New Jalpaiguri Jn - Patna Jn Vande Bharat Express operates six days a week except Tuesdays, covering a distance of 473 km (294 mi) in a travel time of 6 hours with an average speed of 68 km/h (42 mph). The service has 6 intermediate stops. The Maximum Permissible Speed is 130 km/h (81 mph).

== See also ==
- Vande Bharat Express
- Tejas Express
- Gatimaan Express
- New Jalpaiguri Junction railway station
- Patna Junction railway station
