= Guwahati–Dibrugarh Shatabdi Express =

Guwahati-Dibrugarh Shatabdi Express
Overview
- Service type: Shatabdi Express
- First service: 1 May 2017; 8 years ago
- Last service: March 2020
- Current operator: Northeast Frontier Railway

Route
- Termini: Guwahati (GHY); Dibrugarh (DBRG)
- Stops: 7
- Distance travelled: 506 km (314 mi)
- Average journey time: 09 hours 05 minutes
- Service frequency: Tri-Weekly
- Train number: 12085 / 12086

On-board services
- Class: AC Chair Car
- Seating arrangements: Yes
- Sleeping arrangements: No
- Catering facilities: Yes
- Observation facilities: Large windows
- Entertainment facilities: No
- Baggage facilities: Overhead racks

Technical
- Rolling stock: LHB coach
- Track gauge: 1,676 mm (5 ft 6 in)
- Operating speed: 110 km/h (68 mph), including halts
Route map
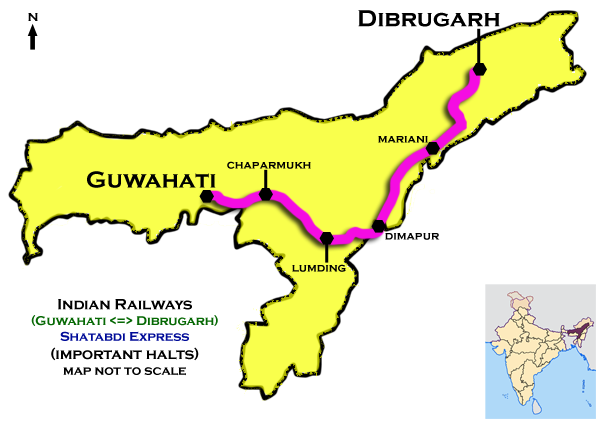

Guwahati-Dibrugarh Shatabdi Express was a Shatabdi Express category type of service belonging to Northeast Frontier Railway zone that ran between Guwahati and Dibrugarh in India.

It operated as train number 12085 from Guwahati to Dibrugarh and as train number 12086 in the reverse direction serving the states of Assam and Nagaland.

== Coaches ==
The 12085/ 86 Guwahati Dibrugarh Shatabdi Express had 6 AC Chair Car and 2 End on Generator coaches. It did not have AC Executive Chair Car Coach or Anubhuti coaches like other Shatabdi Express. Also it did not have a Pantry car coach but being a Shatabdi category train, catering was arranged on board the train.

Loco	1	2	3	4	5	6	7	8
	EOG	C7	C6	C5	C4	C3	C2	EOG

== Service ==
The 12085 / 12086 Guwahati Dibrugarh Shatabdi Express covered the distance of 506 kilometres in 09 hours 05 mins in both directions.

The average speed of the train was 75 km/h (46.6 mph).

== Route ==
The 12085 / 86 Guwahati Dibrugarh Shatabdi Express ran from Guwahati via Chaparmukh Junction, Lumding Junction, Dimapur, Mariani Junction to Dibrugarh.

Being a Shatabdi class train, it returned to its originating station Dibrugarh on next day and also shared rakes with 12087/88 Naharlagun−Guwahati Shatabdi Express
