= Falakata railway station =

Railway Station in West Bengal, India

Falakata Railway Station

General information
- Location: NH 31, Falakata, Dist - Alipurduar, Pin code; 735211 State: West Bengal; India
- Coordinates: 26.53°N 89.2°E
- Elevation: 67 metres (220 ft)
- System: Indian Railways Station
- Owner: Indian Railways
- Operator: Northeast Frontier Railway zone
- Lines: Barauni–Guwahati line, New Jalpaiguri–New Bongaigaon section
- Platforms: 3
- Tracks: 3 (broad gauge)

Construction
- Structure type: At grade
- Parking: Available

Other information
- Status: Functioning
- Station code: FLK
- Zone(s): Northeast Frontier Railway zone
Location
- Location within West Bengal Location within India

Falakata Railway Station serves the town of Falakata in Alipurduar district in the Indian state of West Bengal. Part of Alipurduar railway division, the station lies on the New Jalpaiguri–New Bongaigaon section of Barauni–Guwahati line of Northeast Frontier Railway.

== Trains ==
Major Trains:

- Sealdah–Sabroom Kanchanjunga Express
- Sealdah–Silchar Kanchenjunga Express
- Dibrugarh-Howrah Kamrup Express via Guwahati
- Dibrugarh–Howrah Kamrup Express Via Rangapara North
- Guwahati-Howrah Saraighat Super-fast Express
- Sealdah-New Alipurdiar Teesta Torsha Express
- Kamakhya - Delhi Brahmaputra Mail
- Sealdah-Bamanhat Uttar Banga Express
- New Jalpaiguri - Guwahati Express
- New Jalpaiguri - Bongaigaon Express
