= Kamakhya–Shri Mata Vaishno Devi Katra Express =

Express train in India

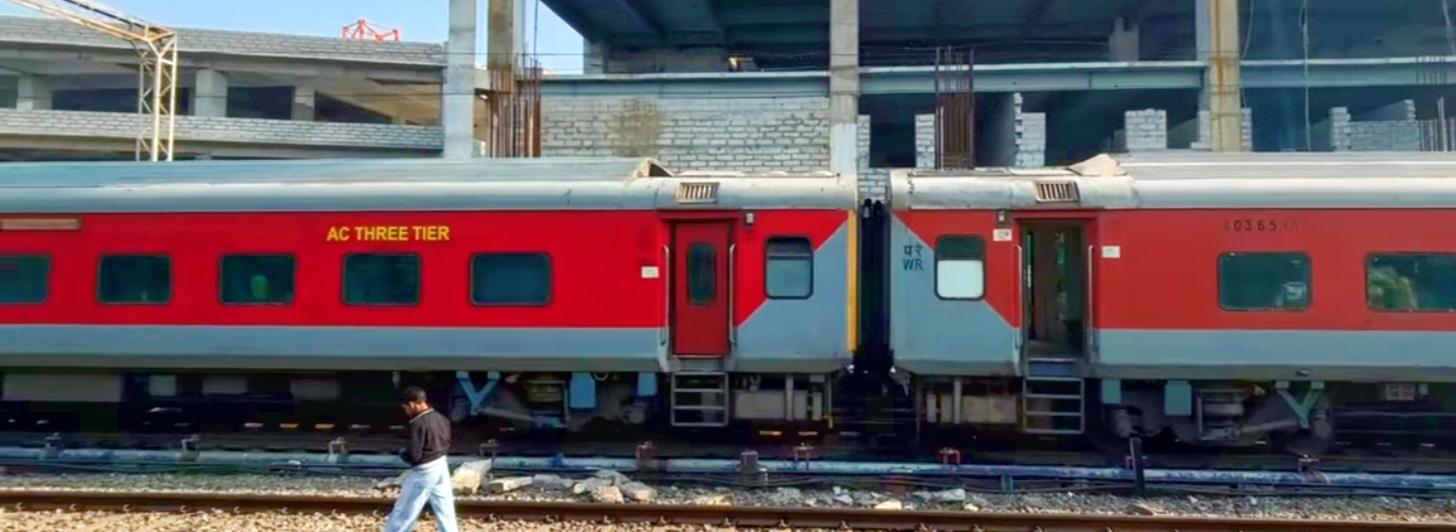
- Kamakhya-SVDK Express at Ludhiana Junction railway station

Overview
- Service type: Express
- First service: 27 May 2016; 10 years ago
- Current operator: Northeast Frontier Railway

Route
- Termini: Kamakhya Junction (KYQ); Shri Mata Vaishno Devi Katra (SVDK)
- Stops: 38
- Distance travelled: 2,559 km (1,590 mi)
- Average journey time: 53h 15m
- Service frequency: Weekly (Note: Runs one day in a week for every direction.)
- Train number: 15655/15656

On-board services
- Classes: AC 2 tier, AC 3 tier, Sleeper class, General Unreserved
- Seating arrangements: No
- Sleeping arrangements: Yes
- Catering facilities: On-board catering E-catering
- Observation facilities: LHB coach
- Entertainment facilities: No
- Baggage facilities: No
- Other facilities: Below the seats

Technical
- Rolling stock: 2
- Track gauge: 1,676 mm (5 ft 6 in)
- Operating speed: 48 km/h (30 mph), including halts

The Kamakhya–Shri Mata Vaishno Devi Katra Express is an Superfast Express train belonging to Northeast Frontier Railway zone that runs between Kamakhya Junction and Shri Mata Vaishno Devi Katra in India. It is currently being operated with 15655/15656 train numbers on a weekly basis. It is 1 of the three trains connecting Guwahati and Jammu Tawi, the other being Lohit Express and Amarnath Express.

== Service ==
The 15655/Kamakhya–Shri Mata Vaishno Devi Katra Express has an average speed of 48 km/h and covers 2559 km in 53h 15m. The 15656/Shri Mata Vaishno Devi Katra–Kamakhya Express has an average speed of 45 km/h and covers 2559 km in 56h 50m.

== Route and halts ==
The important halts of the train are:

ASSAM
- Kamakhya Junction
- New Bongaigaon Junction

WEST BENGAL

- New Alipurduar
- New Cooch Behar
- New Jalpaiguri (Siliguri)

BIHAR

- Katihar Junction
- Barauni Junction
- Samastipur Junction
- Laheriasarai
- Darbhanga Junction
- Sitamarhi Junction
- Raxaul Junction
- Bettiah

UTTAR PRADESH

- Gorakhpur Junction
- Basti
- Gonda Junction
- Sitapur Junction
- Bareilly Junction
- Moradabad Junction
- Saharanpur Junction

UTTARAKHAND

- Laksar Junction

HARYANA

- Ambala Cantonment Junction

PUNJAB

- Ludhiana Junction
- Jalandhar Cantonment Junction
- Pathankot Cantonment

JAMMU KASHMIR

- Jammu Tawi
- Udhampur
- Shri Mata Vaishno Devi Katra

== Schedule ==
Train number	Station code	Departure station	Departure time	Departure day	Arrival station	Arrival time	Arrival day
15655	KYQ	Kamakhya Junction	10:45 AM	SUN	Shri Mata Vaishno Devi Katra	4:00 PM	TUE
15656	SVDK	Shri Mata Vaishno Devi Katra	3:40 AM	WED	Kamakhya Junction	12:30 PM	FRI

== Coach composition ==
The train has standard LHB rakes with a maximum speed of 130 km/h. The train consists of 18 coaches:

- 1 AC II Tier
- 3 AC III Tier
- 6 Sleeper coaches
- 6 General Unreserved
- 2 End-on Generator

== Traction ==
Both trains are hauled by a Siliguri Loco Shed-based WDP 4/ WDP 4B/ WDP 4D diesel locomotive from Kamakhya to New Coochbehar. From New Coochbehar the train is hauled by a Ghaziabad Loco Shed-based WAP-7 electric locomotive up till Katra, and vice versa.

== See also ==
- Shri Mata Vaishno Devi Katra railway station
- Kamakhya Junction railway station
- Indore–Guwahati Weekly Express
