= Srirampur Colony =

- town
- Country: India
- State: Telangana
- District: Mancherial

Government
  - Type: SCCL MINES

Languages
  - Official: Telugu
- Time zone: UTC+5:30 (IST)
- PIN: 504303
- Vehicle registration: TS
- Website: telangana.gov.in

Srirampur Colony is a major suburb in Naspur town in Mancherial district in the Indian state of Telangana.
