= Kamakhyaguri railway station =

Railway Station in West Bengal, India

Kamakhyaguri কামাখ্যাগুড়ি

General information
- Location: NH 31C, Station Rd, Dakhin Narathali, Alipurduar 736202 State: West Bengal; India
- Coordinates: 26.48°N 89.73°E
- Elevation: 53 metres (174 ft)
- System: Indian Railways Station
- Owner: Indian Railways
- Operator: Northeast Frontier Railway zone
- Lines: Barauni–Guwahati line, New Jalpaiguri–New Bongaigaon section
- Platforms: 3
- Tracks: 5 (broad gauge)

Construction
- Structure type: At grade
- Parking: Available

Other information
- Status: Functioning
- Station code: KAMG
- Zone(s): Northeast Frontier Railway zone
- Division(s): Alipurduar
Location
- Location within West Bengal Location within India

Kamakhyaguri Railway Station serves the town of Uttar Kamakhyaguri, Alipurduar district in the Indian state of West Bengal. Part of the Alipurduar railway division, the station lies on the New Jalpaiguri–New Bongaigaon section of Barauni–Guwahati line of Northeast Frontier Railway.

== Trains ==
Major Trains:

- Sealdah–Sabroom Kanchanjunga Express
- Sealdah–Silchar Kanchanjunga Express
- Dibrugarh–Howrah Kamrup Express via Guwahati
- Dibrugarh–Howrah Kamrup Express Via Rangapara North
- New Jalpaiguri - Guwahati Express
- New Jalpaiguri - Bongaigaon Express
- Alipurduar–Kamakhya Intercity Express
