= Pathsala railway station =

Railway station in Assam, India

Pathsala Railway Station

General information
- Location: Pathsala, Assam; India
- Coordinates: 26.499382°N 91.179271°E
- Elevation: 48 metres (157 ft)
- System: Indian Railways station
- Owner: Indian Railways
- Platforms: 2
- Tracks: 3
- Connections: Auto stand

Construction
- Structure type: At grade
- Parking: Yes
- Cycle facilities: Yes

Other information
- Status: Single diesel line
- Station code: PBL
- Zone(s): Northeast Frontier
- Division(s): Rangiya
Location
- Location within Assam Location within India

Pathsala Railway Station is the single railway station in Pathsala, in Bajali district of Assam, India. It is under the Northeast Frontier Railway zone.

Preceding station	Indian Railways	Following station
Sarupeta towards ?	Northeast Frontier Railway zone Barauni–Guwahati line	Tihu towards ?
