= Kaithalkuchi =

Village in Assam, India

- Village
- Map of Assam Kaithalkuchi (India)
- Coordinates: 26.4544°N 91.3421°E
- Country: India
- State: Assam
- District: Nalbari
- Subdivision: Nalbari
- Gram Panchayat: Paschim Dharmapur

Area
  - Total: 635.26 ha (1,569.8 acres)

Population (2011)
  - Total: 3,831
  - Density: 603.1/km^{2} (1,562/sq mi)

Languages
  - Official: Assamese
- Time zone: UTC+5:30 (IST)
- Postal code: 781370
- STD Code: 03624
- Census code: 303982

Kaithalkuchi is a census village in Nalbari district, Assam, India. As per the 2011 Census of India, Kaithalkuchi village has a total population of 3,831 people including 1,966 males and 1,865 females with a literacy rate of 81.39%.

== Kaithalkuchi railway station ==
The Kaithalkuchi railway station is the primary method of travel by the nearby villagers.

The Kaithalkuchi railway station code is KTCH. Details about trains and timings are in the following table.

Train ID	Train Name	Arrival	Departure	Stop time	Destination
55714	RNY - NJP Passenger	4:07 a.m.	4:08 a.m.	0:01:00	New Jalpaiguri
55818	GHY - NBQ Passenger	11:32 a.m.	11:33 a.m.	0:01:00	New Bongaigaon Junction
55810	GHY - NBQ Passenger	6:50 a.m.	6:51 a.m.	0:01:00	New Bongaigaon Junction
55802	MANAS RHINO	7:34 p.m.	7:35 p.m.	0:01:00	New Bongaigaon Junction
55817	NBQ - GHY Passenger	4:45 p.m.	4:46 p.m.	0:01:00	Guwahati
55754	SIFHUNG Passenger	4:22 p.m.	4:23 p.m.	0:01:00	Alipur Duar
55801	MANAS RHINO	6:48 a.m.	6:49 a.m.	0:01:00	Guwahati
15770	LMG APDJ Intercity	8:52 p.m.	8:53 p.m.	0:01:00	Alipur Duar
55809	NBQ - GHY Passenger	7:12 p.m.	7:13 p.m.	0:01:00	Guwahati
15769	APDJ LMG Intercity	8:00 a.m.	8:01 a.m.	0:01:00	Lumding Junction
55753	SIFHUNG Passenger	8:40 a.m.	8:41 a.m.	0:01:00	Guwahati
55713	NJP - RNY Passenger	8:50 p.m.	8:51 p.m.	0:01:00	Rangiya Junction
