= New Jalpaiguri–Guwahati Vande Bharat Express =

Mini Vande Bharat Express train route in India

New Jalpaiguri Junction - Guwahati Vande Bharat Express

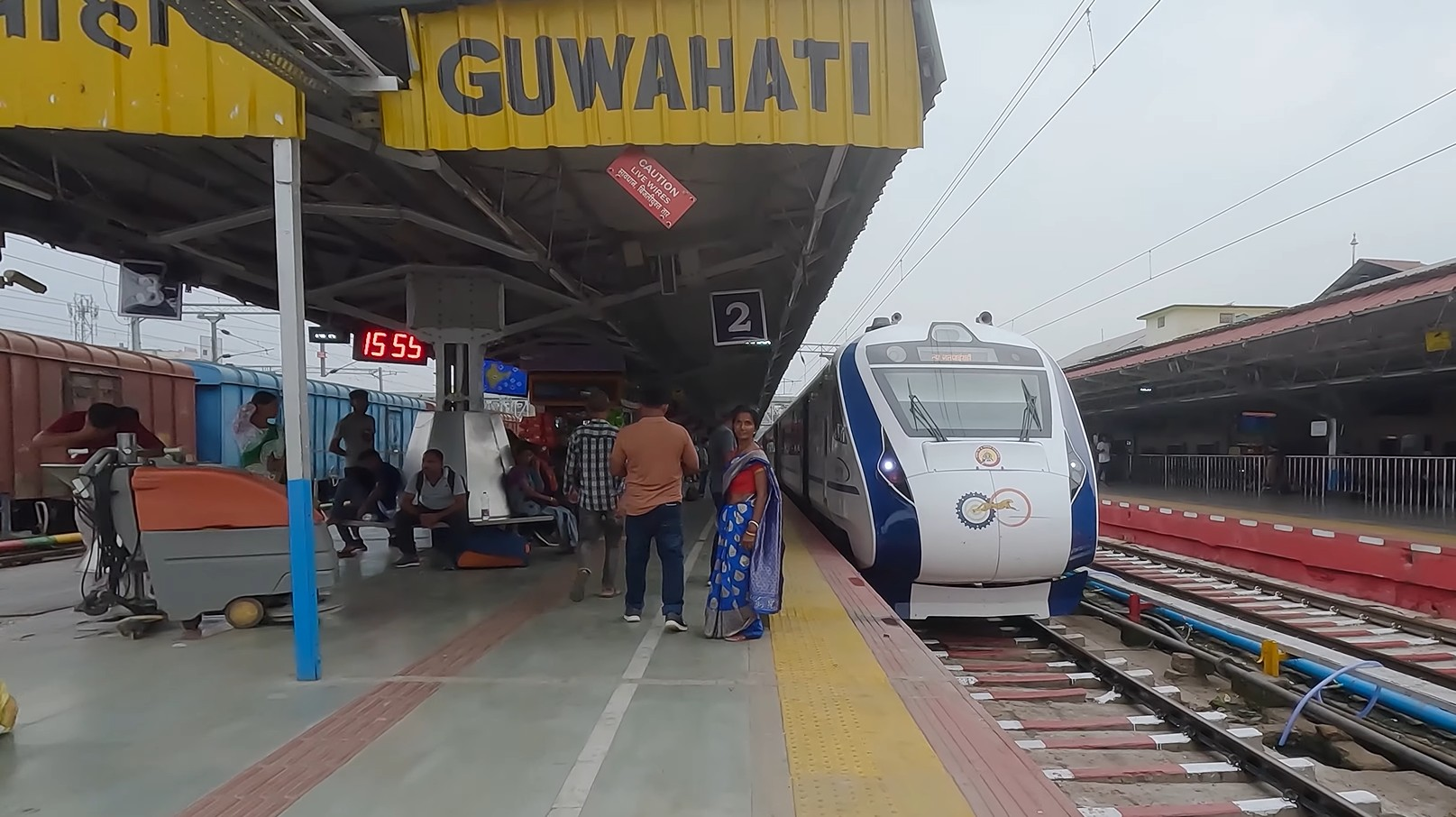
- This Mini Vande Bharat Express on standby and heading towards New Jalpaiguri Junction

Overview
- Service type: Vande Bharat Express
- Locale: West Bengal and Assam
- First service: 29 May 2023 (Inaugural run); 31 May 2023; 3 years ago (Commercial run)
- Current operator: North East Frontier Railways (NFR)

Route
- Termini: New Jalpaiguri Junction (NJP); Guwahati (GHY)
- Stops: 5
- Distance travelled: 407 km (253 mi)
- Average journey time: 05 hrs 30 mins
- Service frequency: Six days a week (Note: Except Tuesdays)
- Train number: 22227 / 22228
- Lines used: New Jalpaiguri–New Bongaigaon section; New Bongaigaon–Guwahati section

On-board services
- Classes: AC Chair Car, AC Executive Chair Car
- Seating arrangements: Airline style; Rotatable seats
- Sleeping arrangements: No
- Catering facilities: On-board catering
- Observation facilities: Large windows in all coaches
- Entertainment facilities: On-board WiFi; Infotainment System; Electric outlets; Reading light; Seat Pockets; Bottle Holder; Tray Table
- Baggage facilities: Overhead racks
- Other facilities: Kavach

Technical
- Rolling stock: Mini Vande Bharat 2.0
- Track gauge: Indian gauge 1,676 mm (5 ft 6 in) broad gauge
- Electrification: 25 kV 50 Hz AC Overhead line
- Operating speed: 74 km/h (46 mph) (Avg.)
- Average length: 192 metres (630 ft) (08 coaches)
- Track owner: Indian Railways
- Rake maintenance: New Jalpaiguri Jn (NJP)

The 22227/22228 New Jalpaiguri - Guwahati Vande Bharat Express is India's 18th Vande Bharat Express train, connecting the city of Siliguri in West Bengal with city of Guwahati in Assam, two most important cities of the northeastern part of India, via the cities of Coochbehar and Alipurduar in North Bengal and Kokrajhar and Bongaigaon of Assam. It was inaugurated on 29 May 2023 and is the first Vande Bharat Express train serving the North East of India.

== Overview ==
This train is operated by Indian Railways, connecting New Jalpaiguri Jn, New Cooch Behar Jn, New Alipurduar, Kokrajhar, New Bongaigaon Jn, Kamakhya Jn and Guwahati. It is currently operated with train numbers 22227/22228 on 6 days a week basis. This train was flagged off by Prime Minister Narendra Modi on 29 May 2023.

This train connects the largest city of North Bengal, Siliguri with the capital of Assam, Guwahati along with many major towns on the way. It forms a link between the two ethno-culturally similar regions of the country. This train also provides a solution to many business and leisure travellers as there was a longtime need for a daytime seater train on this route.

== Rakes ==
It is the sixteenth 2nd Generation and the fourth Mini Vande Bharat 2.0 Express train which was designed and manufactured by the Integral Coach Factory at Perambur, Chennai under the Make in India Initiative.

== Service ==
The 22227/22228 New Jalpaiguri Jn - Guwahati Vande Bharat Express operates six days a week except Tuesdays, covering a distance of 407 km (253 mi) in a travel time of 5 hours with an average speed of 74 km/h (46 mph). The service has 5 intermediate stops. The Maximum Permissible Speed is 130 km/h (81 mph).

== See also ==
- Vande Bharat Express
- Gatimaan Express
- Tejas Express
- New Jalpaiguri Junction railway station
- Guwahati railway station
