= Barauni–Guwahati line =

Railway section in India

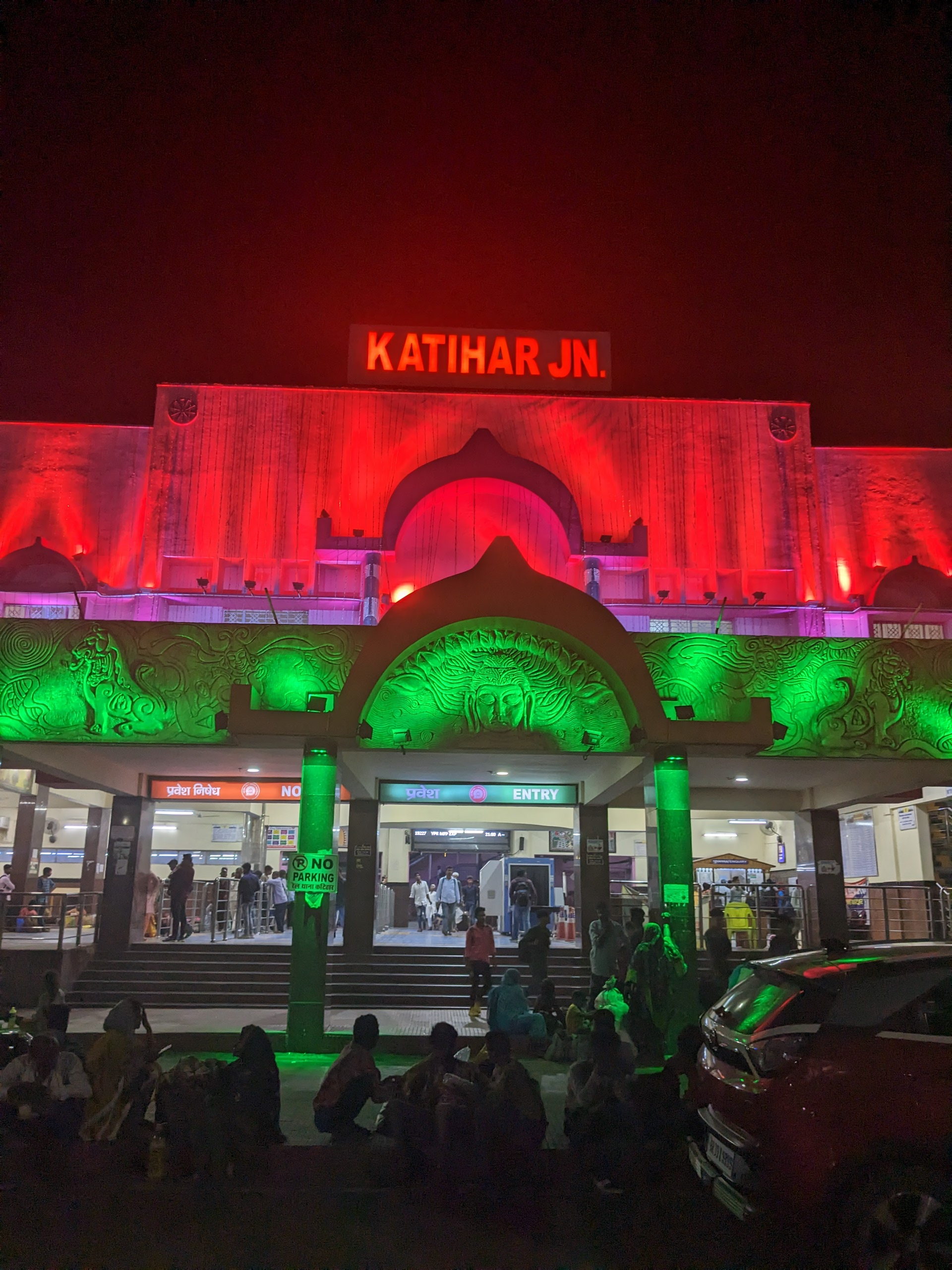
- Katihar Junction railway station is important Station on Barauni –Guwahati Line

Overview
- Status: Operational
- Owner: Indian Railways
- Locale: Bihar, Assam
- Termini: Barauni; Guwahati
- Stations: Barauni Junction; Begusarai; Khagaria Junction; Naugachia; Katihar; Dalkhola; Kishanganj; New Jalpaiguri; Siliguri Junction; Jalpaiguri Junction; Jalpaiguri Road; New Maynaguri; Dhupguri; Falakata; New Cooch Behar; New Alipurduar; Kamakhyaguri; Gossaigaon Hat; Fakiragram; Kokrajhar; New Bongaigaon; Rangia; Kamakhya; Guwahati

Service
- Operator(s): East Central Railway, Northeast Frontier Railway

History
- Opened: 1950

Technical
- Line length: 784 km (487 mi)
- Track gauge: 5 ft 6 in (1,676 mm) broad gauge
- Electrification: Yes
- Operating speed: 110 km/h

The Barauni–Guwahati railway line connects Barauni, Saharsa, Purnia and Katihar in the Indian state of Bihar and Bongaigaon, Kamakhya and Guwahati in Assam via Siliguri, Jalpaiguri, Cooch Behar and Alipurduar in West Bengal. It is a linkage of prime importance for Northeastern India with Capital of india.

== Sections ==
The 784 km (487 mi)-long trunk line, been treated in more detail in smaller sections:

1. Barauni–Katihar section
2. Katihar–New Jalpaiguri Section
3. New Jalpaiguri–New Bongaigaon section
4. New Bongaigaon–Guwahati section

== History ==
=== Pre-independence era ===
The earliest railway tracks in Assam were laid in the Dibrugarh area in 1882 for the transportation of tea and coal. The first passenger railway was also in that area.

Linking Guwahati was the challenge. In response to the demands of tea planters in Assam for a rail link to Chittagong port, the Assam Bengal Railway started construction of a railway track on the eastern side of Bengal in 1891. A 150 km (93 mi) track between Chittagong and Comilla was opened to traffic in 1895. The Comilla–Akhaura–Kulaura–Badarpur section was opened in 1896–1898 and finally extended to Lumding in 1903. The Assam Bengal Railway constructed a branch line to Guwahati, connecting the city to the eastern line in 1900.

During the period 1884–1889, Assam Behar State Railway linked Parbatipur, now in Bangladesh, with Katihar in Bihar. North Bengal State Railway had opened a metre-gauge line from Parbatipur and the line subsequently got extended beyond the Teesta, and through Geetaldaha to Golokganj in Assam. During the 1900–1910 period, the Eastern Bengal Railway built the Golakganj–Amingaon branch line, thus connecting the western bank of the Brahmaputra to Bihar and the rest of India. Katihar got linked to Barauni around the turn of the century.

=== Assam Link project ===
With the partition of India railways in Assam got delinked from those in the rest of India. Indian Railway took up the Assam Link project in 1948 to build a rail link between Fakiragram and Kishanganj. Fakiragram was connected to the Indian railway system in 1950 through the Indian portion of North Bengal with a metre-gauge track. The New Jalpaiguri–New Bongaigaon section was partly new construction, partly old line converted to 5 ft 6 in (1,676 mm) broad gauge in 1966. Broad gauge reached Guwahati in 1984.

== Bridges ==
Including major & minor bridges, approx. 100 Bridges falls in Barauni-Guwahati mainline.

The construction of the 2.025 km (1.258 mi)-long Rajendra Setu near Barauni in 1959 provided the first opportunity to link the railway tracks on the north and south banks of the Ganges.

The 3.792 kilometres (2.356 mi)-long rail-cum-road bridge located at Munger 65 kilometres (40 mi) downstream of the Rajendra Setu, links Jamalpur Junction station on the Sahibganj loop line of Eastern Railway to the Barauni–Katihar section of East Central Railway.

The 1,600 m (5,200 ft)-long Kosi River Bridge at Kursela connects Barauni & Katihar.

The 2,256.25 m (7,402.4 ft)-long Farakka Barrage carries a rail-cum-road bridge across the Ganges. The rail bridge was thrown open to the public in 1971, thereby linking Kolkata with North Bengal and Assam.

The 1,024 metres (3,360 ft)-long Teesta River bridge, the 792 metres (2,598 ft)-long Jaldhaka River bridge & the 748 metres (2,454 ft)-long Torsha River bridge connects New Jalpaiguri with New Coochbehar section of Barauni - Guwahati mainline.

The construction of the 1.495 km (0.929 mi)-long Saraighat Bridge, the first rail-cum-road bridge across the Brahmaputra, was an event of great excitement. Jawaharlal Nehru, India's first prime minister formally laid the foundation stone on 10 January 1960 and it was completed in 1962, connecting the two parts of the metre-gauge railways in Assam.

The construction of the 2.304 km (1.432 mi)-long Naranarayan Setu in 1998 lessened the load on Saraighat Bridge. The bridge named after Coochbehar King Sri Naranarayan Koch (Rajbangsi) Maharaj falls in 182.9 km (113.6 mi) long New Bongaigaon - Goalpara Town - Guwahati Railway line. This line is the alternate railway link of 157.5 km (97.9 mi) New Bongaigaon - Rangiya - Guwahati section.

== Electrification ==
Electrification of the 784 km (487 mi)-long Barauni–Katihar–Guwahati section was sanctioned. As of July 2021, Katihar - Srirampur Assam and Bongaigaon Kamakhya section has been electrified, and many electric passenger trains are going up to NCB.
