= Kamakhya Junction railway station =

Railway station in Assam, India

KAMAKHYA JUNCTION

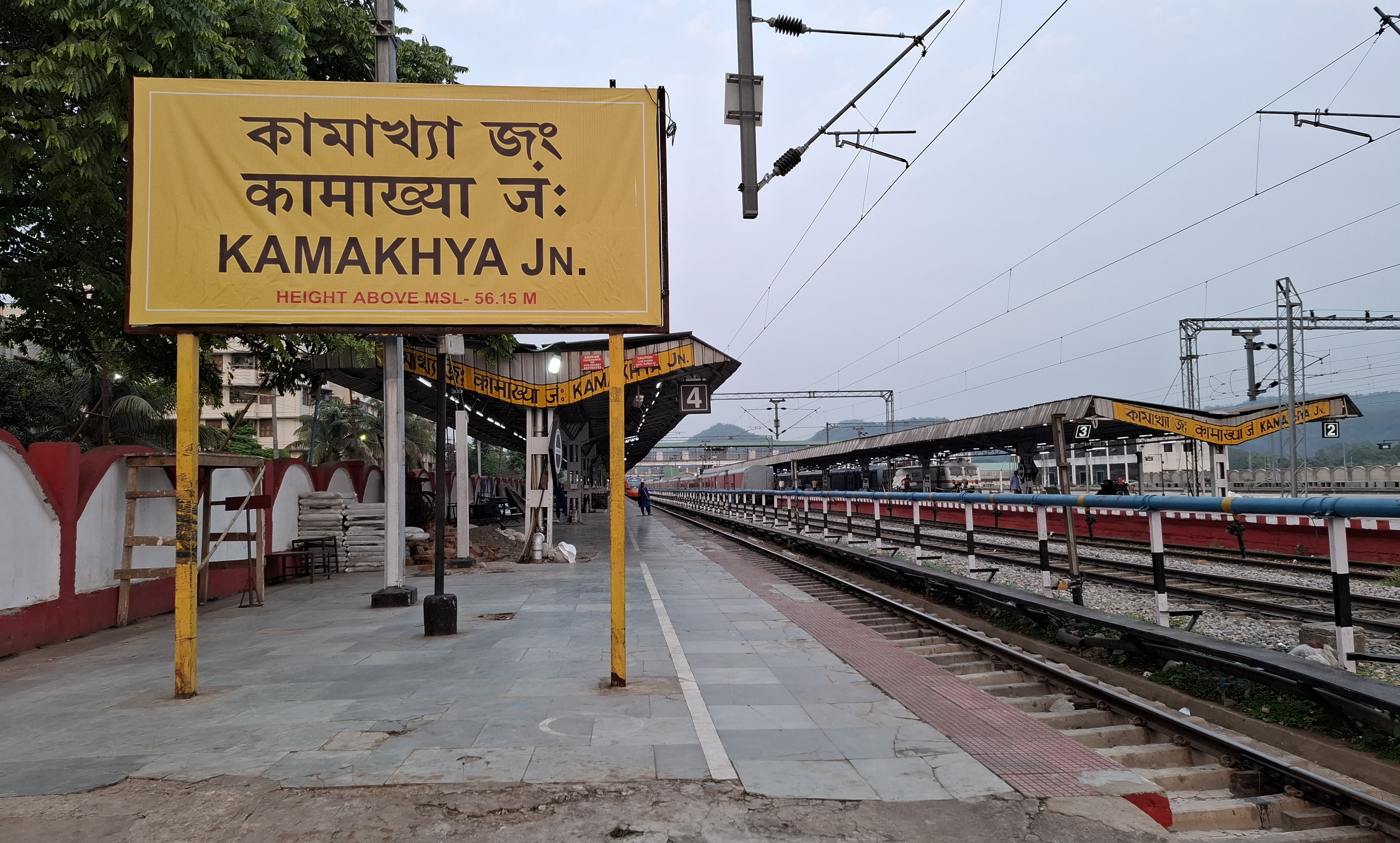
- Kamakhya Junction Railway Station

General information
- Location: Kamakhya Station Road, Green Park Colony, Maligaon, Guwahati-781011, Kamrup Metropolitan, Assam; India
- Coordinates: 26°09′26″N 91°41′27″E
- Elevation: 55 metres (180 ft)
- System: Regional rail & Commuter rail station
- Owner: Indian Railways
- Operator: Northeast Frontier Railway zone
- Lines: Barauni–Guwahati line; New Bongaigaon-Jogihopa-Kamakhya line; Kamakhya-Pandu branch line
- Platforms: 6 (2 platforms are under construction)
- Tracks: 12
- Connections: Cabs, City Bus, Pandu Port Auto-rickshaw

Construction
- Structure type: At grade
- Parking: Available
- Cycle facilities: Available
- Accessible: Yes

Other information
- Status: Functioning
- Station code: KYQ
- Zone(s): Northeast Frontier
- Division(s): Lumding

History
- Electrified: Yes (27 March 2021)
- Former names: Assam Bengal Railway

Services
Location
- Location within Guwahati Location within Assam

Kamakhya Junction Railway Station is a railway junction station located at Maligaon in Guwahati in the Indian state of Assam.

== Location ==
The station lies near to the headquarters of Northeast Frontier Railway. It is the second-largest railway station of Guwahati after Guwahati railway station.

== Station facilities ==
Kamakhya junction has upgraded its passenger amenities in recent past. The station is being developed jointly with the Union Ministry of Tourism.

Following services available in Kamakhya Junction:

- 10 (02 Bedded) AC Retiring Rooms with Free Wi-Fi/TV/Charging point
- 01 (10 Bedded) AC Dormitory with Free Wi-Fi/TV/Locker for Gents
- 01 (10 Bedded) AC Dormitory with Free Wi-Fi/TV/Locker for Ladies
- High Speed Google Railwire Free Wi-Fi service
- Upper Class/Lower Class Waiting Rooms having 120 seat capacity with Free Wi-Fi/AC/TV/Charging points/Drinking water & separate Ladies/Gents Washrooms
- Veg/Non-Veg Food Court
- Cafeteria
- FOB with 5x Escalators/Elevators 1x
- CCTV Surveillance
- Cloak Room

== Major trains ==
1. New Jalpaiguri - Guwahati Vande Bharat Express
2. Kamakhya–Howrah Vande Bharat Sleeper Express
3. Kamakhya - Lokmanya Tilak Terminus AC Superfast Express
4. Kamakhya - Sir M. Visvesvaraya Terminal AC Superfast Express
5. Kamakhya–Shri Mata Vaishno Devi Katra Express
6. Kamakhya–Gandhidham Superfast Express
7. Kamakhya - Lokmanya Tilak Terminus Karmabhoomi Express.
8. Kamakhya - Udaipur City Kavi Guru Express
9. Kamakhya - Jodhpur, Bhagat Ki Kothi Express
10. Kamakhya - Delhi Brahmaputra Mail
11. Kamakhya–Rohtak Amrit Bharat Express
12. Kamakhya - Dr. Ambedkar Nagar Express
13. Kamakhya - Ranchi Express
14. Kamakhya - Anand Vihar Terminal Northeast Express
15. Kamakhya - Puri Express via Howrah
16. Kamakhya - Puri Express (via Adra)
17. Kamakhya–Gaya Express
18. Kamakhya - Gomti Nagar Superfast Express
19. Kamakhya - Charlapalli Amrit Bharat Express
20. Dibrugarh - Gomti Nagar Amrit Bharat Express
21. Kamakhya-Arah Capital Express

== See also ==
- North Eastern Railway Connectivity Project
- North Western Railway zone

Preceding station	Indian Railways	Following station
Agthori towards Barauni Junction	Northeast Frontier Railway zone Barauni–Guwahati line	Guwahati Terminus
Azara towards ?	Northeast Frontier Railway zone New Bongaigaon–Kamakhya line	Terminus
Pandu towards ?	Northeast Frontier Railway zone Guwahati–Pandu section	Guwahati towards ?
