= Guwahati railway station =

Railway station in Assam, India

Guwahati

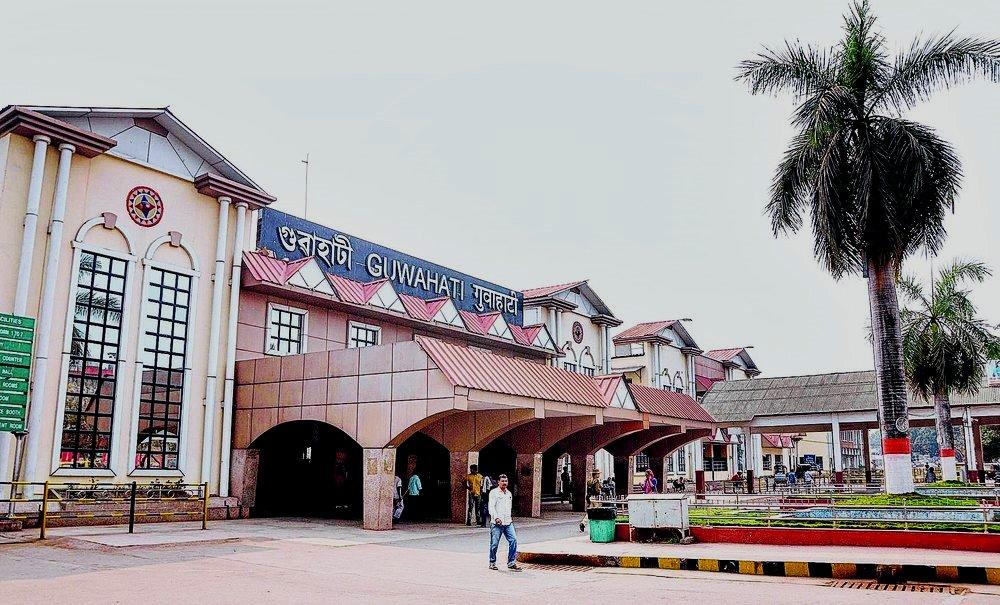
- Guwahati Railway station

General information
- Location: Station Road, Gopinath Bordoloi Road, Paltan Bazaar, Guwahati-781001, Assam; India
- Coordinates: 26°10′56″N 91°45′01″E
- Elevation: 56.22 metres (184.4 ft)
- System: Regional Rail & Commuter Rail Station
- Owner: Indian Railways
- Operator: Northeast Frontier Railways
- Lines: Delhi–Guwahati main line, Barauni–Guwahati line; Guwahati–Lumding section; New Bongaigaon–Guwahati section
- Platforms: 7
- Tracks: 24
- Connections: Cabs, ASTC Bus Terminal, Auto, E-rickshaw

Construction
- Structure type: At grade
- Parking: Available
- Cycle facilities: Available
- Accessible: Yes

Other information
- Status: Functioning
- Station code: GHY
- Zone(s): Northeast Frontier
- Division(s): Lumding

History
- Opened: 1900; 126 years ago
- Electrified: Yes (October 2021)
- Former names: Assam Bengal Railway

Passengers
- 300M/Year: 800K/Day (▲ high)

Services
Location
- Interactive map

Guwahati Railway Station (Station code: GHY) is located in the heart of the city of Guwahati, Assam. It is the first fully solar-operated railway station in India. It has been rated as A1-category station. The ASTC (Assam State Transport Corporation) bus terminal is located at the rear-end of the station.

An ISO-certified railway station, Guwahati Railway Station has been ranked 21 in cleanliness among the A1-category railway stations in India.

To reduce the traffic on the Guwahati junction, there is another railway station in the city at Maligaon, the Kamakhya railway station. Almost all newly introduced trains run from the Kamakhya Jn. railway station only. Plans had been made to make a new railway station at Beltola (in the southern part of Guwahati) to introduce trains towards Shillong, Meghalaya. Those plans have not been finalized and are still in progress.

== History ==
In 2021, Guwahati railway station claimed to have become the first railway station to run entirely on solar power. The solar panel installation project was commissioned in April 2017, but an on-the-spot assessment by G Plus in February 2023 revealed that the solar power generated by the railway station covered only 15 per cent of its power requirements.

In recent years the railway station has received a 100 feet-high tricolour. It is the tallest tricolour among any railway station in northeast India.

== Station facilities ==
The station is the divisional headquarters for the Northeast Frontier Railway. It became the first ever Railway station in the Indian Railways to get an ISO certification from the National Green Tribunal for "providing passenger amenities in a clean and green environment".

=== Platforms ===
The station has seven platforms. It serves the long-distance trains of NFR. Google along with RailWire provided Free high speed Wifi until 2020. However, RailTel (RailWire's parent company) has confirmed that it will continue to provide free Wifi Internet services.

=== Rest and recuperation ===
The following services are available at Guwahati Railway Station:

- 03 (02 Bedded) Delux AC Retiring Rooms with Free Wi-Fi/TV/Locker/Charging point
- 02 (02 Bedded) AC Retiring Rooms with Free Wi-Fi/TV/Locker
- 02 (05 Bedded) Non-AC Retiring Rooms with Free Wi-Fi/TV/Locker
- 02 (02 Bedded) Non-Ac Retiring Rooms with Free Wi-Fi/TV/Locker
- 01 (12 Bedded) Non-AC Dormitory with Free Wi-Fi/TV/Locker
- Reserve VIP Lounge
- Upper Class/Lower Class Waiting Rooms having Free Wi-Fi/AC/TV/Charging points/Drinking water & separate Ladies/Gents Washrooms
- Cloak Room

=== Food and beverage ===
- Veg/Non-Veg Food Court
- Cafeteria

=== Others ===
- Chemist Stall
- High-Speed Google Railwire Free Wi-Fi service
- FOB with 10X Escalators/Elevators 4X
- CCTV Surveillance

== Rolling stock ==
=== Major trains ===
- Guwahati-NJP Vande Bharat Express
- Agartala Rajdhani Express
- Dibrugarh Rajdhani Express
- Dibrugarh-Kanyakumari Vivek Express
- Avadh Assam Express
- SMVT Bengaluru Humsafar Express
- Aronai Express
- Naharlagun Shatabdi Express
- Dibrugarh Shatabdi Express
- Saraighat Express
- Poorvottar Sampark Kranti Express
- Tripura Sundari Express
- Kamrup Express
- Guwahati–Jorhat Town Jan Shatabdi Express
- Amarnath Express
- Kaziranga Superfast Express
- Lohit Express
- Silchar–Charlapalli Express
- Bikaner-Guwahati Express
- Silchar-Coimbatore Express
- Dibrugarh-Chandigarh Express
- New Tinsukia–Amritsar Express
- Kanchanjungha Express
- Dibrugarh - Mumbai LTT Express
- Barmer–Guwahati Express
- New Tinsukia SMVT Bengaluru Express
- Dibrugarh–Rajendra Nagar Weekly Express
- Agartala Deoghar Express
- Nagaon Express
- Guwahati–Dullabcherra Express
- Guwahati–Sairang Express
- Rangiya-Silchar Express
- Sairang Rajdhani Express
- Agartala Tejas Rajdhani Express

=== Services for rolling stock ===
The station has a diesel locomotive shed with room for 80 locomotives. The sheds accommodate WDM-3D, WDG-4D, WDG-4 and WDS class locomotives. The shed now also accommodates WDP-4D locomotives. The station has a coach maintenance complex.

== Diesel Loco Shed, New Guwahati City ==
Serial No.	Locomotive Class	Horsepower	Holding
1.	WDM-3D	3300	15
2.	WDG-4/4D	4000/4500	37
3.	WDP-4/4D	4000/4500	72
4.	WAP-7	6350	56
5.	WAG-9	6120	49
Total Locomotives Active as of June 2026			229

== Railway in Assam ==
=== Existing ===
- North bank of Brahmaputra River.
  - Guwahati–Dibrugarh line (part of the Delhi–Dibrugarh route), operational.
    - New Bongaigaon–Rangiya-Agthori line, parallel to the above,
  - Rangiya–Murkongselek section, 450 km (280 mi)-long operational line.
  - Bogibeel Bridge–Dhemaji rail line, completed 2025, connects rail network on north and south bank of Brahmaputra River.
- South bank of Brahmaputra River.
  - Lumding–Dibrugarh section, 376-kilometre (234 mi)-long operational line from Guwahati to Barak Valley in South Assam.

=== Proposed ===
- North bank of Brahmaputra River.
  - Murkongselek–Pasighat line (Arunachal-Assam connectivity), proposed, survey stage.
  - Guwahati–North Lakhimpur line, proposed, feasibility study ongoing in July 2025.
- South bank of Brahmaputra River.
  - Silchar–Saurashtra line (East-West Dedicated Freight Corridor expansion), proposed, under consideration by Rail Ministry in January 2023.

== See also ==
- North Eastern Railway Connectivity Project
- North Western Railway zone

Preceding station	Indian Railways	Following station
Kamakhya Junction towards ?	Northeast Frontier Railway zone Barauni–Guwahati line	Terminus
Terminus	Northeast Frontier Railway zone Guwahati–Lumding section	Lumding Junction towards ?
