= Bamanhat =

- Neighbourhood
- Location in West Bengal, India Bamanhat (India)
- Coordinates: 26.0706°N 89.5862°E
- Country: India
- State: West Bengal
- District: Cooch Behar
- Time zone: UTC+5:30 (IST)
- PIN: 736168
- Telephone/STD code: 03581
- Vehicle registration: WB
- Lok Sabha constituency: Cooch Behar
- Vidhan Sabha constituency: Dinhata
- Website: coochbehar.gov.in

Bamanhat is a neighbourhood and a gram panchayat in the Dinhata II CD block in the Dinhata subdivision of the Cooch Behar district, West Bengal, India.

== Geography ==
Places in the Tufanganj and Dinhata subdivisions (except Sitai CD block) in Cooch Behar district
CT: census town, M: municipal town, R: rural/ urban centre, H: historical/ religious centre
Owing to space constraints in the small map, the actual locations in a larger map may vary slightly

=== Location ===
Bamanhat is located at 26.0706°N 89.5862°E.

Bamanhat I and Bamanhat II are gram panchayats in Dinhata II CD block.

Bamanhat is not identified as a separate inhabited settlement in the 2011 census record. As per map of Dinhata II map in the District Census Handbook 2011, Koch Bihar it appears to be a part of Kalamati village/ mouza.

=== Area overview ===
The map alongside shows the eastern part of the district. In Tufanganj subdivision 6.97% of the population lives in the urban areas and 93.02% lives in the rural areas. In Dinhata subdivision 5.98% of the population lives in the urban areas and 94.02% lives in the urban areas. The entire district forms the flat alluvial flood plains of mighty rivers.

Note: The map alongside presents some of the notable locations in the subdivisions. All places marked in the map are linked in the larger full screen map.

== Education ==
Bamanhat High School is a Bengali-medium coeducational institution established in 1970.

== Culture ==
Bamanhat also has the Madhaikhal fair, held annually in the Bengali month of Chaitra.

== Railway links ==
Bamanhat railway station is on the broad gauge Alipurduar-Bamanhat branch line. Local trains link the area to larger stations at Cooch Behar and Alipurduar from where trains are available for places all over the country.

In the early 1900s, Eastern Bengal Railway extended the Metre gauge railways to Lalmonirhat, Gitaldaha (via Mogalhat), Bamanhat, Golokganj and other places, thereby connecting Assam to Katihar, in Bihar. In 1901 Cooch Behar State Railway built the narrow gauge line from Gitaldaha to Jayanti, near the Bhutan border. Shortly thereafter, the line was upgraded to metre gauge. During the British era, there was a railway line linking Assam with Bengal that passed through Sonahat. The partition of the country and formation of the erstwhile East Pakistan (now Bangladesh) led to complete severance of communication with the State of Assam from the rest of India.

The 72 km long Alipurduar-Bamanhat branch line was converted to 5 ft 6 in (1,676 mm) broad gauge in 2007.

== Healthcare ==
Bamanhat Rural Hospital, with 30 beds at Bamanhat, is the major government medical facility in the Dinhata II CD block.
