= Gitaldaha =

- Village
- Location in West Bengal Location in India
- Coordinates: 26.032°N 89.484°E
- Country: India
- State: West Bengal
- District: Cooch Behar

Population (2011)
  - Total: 2,058
- Time zone: UTC+5:30 (IST)
- PIN: 736135
- Telephone/STD code: 03582
- Vehicle registration: WB
- Lok Sabha constituency: Cooch Behar
- Vidhan Sabha constituency: Sitai
- Website: coochbehar.gov.in

Gitaldaha is a village and a gram panchayat in the Dinhata I CD block in the Dinhata subdivision of the Cooch Behar district in the state of West Bengal, India.

== Geography ==
Places in the Tufanganj and Dinhata subdivisions (except Sitai CD block) in Cooch Behar district
CT: census town, M: municipal town, R: rural/ urban centre, H: historical/ religious centre
Owing to space constraints in the small map, the actual locations in a larger map may vary slightly

=== Location ===
Gitaldaha is located at 26.032°N 89.484°E.

Gitaldaha I and Gitaldaha II are gram panchayats in Dinhata I CD block.

=== Area overview ===
The map alongside shows the eastern part of the district. In Tufanganj subdivision 6.97% of the population lives in the urban areas and 93.02% lives in the rural areas. In Dinhata subdivision 5.98% of the population lives in the urban areas and 94.02% lives in the urban areas. The entire district forms the flat alluvial flood plains of mighty rivers.

Note: The map alongside presents some of the notable locations in the subdivisions. All places marked in the map are linked in the larger full screen map.

== Demographics ==
As per the 2011 Census of India, Gitaldaha had a total population of 3,917. There were 2,058 (53%) males and 1,859 (47%) females. There were 492 persons in the age range of 0 to 6 years. The total number of literate people in Gitaldaha was 2,563 (74.83% of the population over 6 years).

== Railway connections ==
New Gitaldaha railway station is on the broad gauge Alipurduar-Bamanhat branch line. Local trains link the area to larger stations at Cooch Behar and Alipurduar from where trains are available for places all over the country.

The area was agog with railway activity in the 19th-20th century. The Assam Behar State Railway linked Parbatipur to Katihar, with a metre gauge line in 1889. in the early 1900s, the Eastern Bengal Railway extended railways to Lalmonirhat, Gitaldaha (via Mogalhat), Bamanhat, Golokganj and other places, thereby connecting Assam to Katihar, in Bihar, via North Bengal. In 1901 Cooch Behar State Railway built the narrow gauge line from Gitaldaha to Jayanti, near the Bhutan border. Shortly thereafter, the line was upgraded to meter gauge.

The Lalmonirhat-Mogalhat-Gitaldaha route was functional when India and Pakistan agreed in 1955 for resumption of railway traffic between the two countries, and it included movement of cross traffic via Mogalhat through the Eastern Bengal Railway. A portion of the bridge across the Dharla River at 26.00304°N 89.46934°E was washed away by floods in 1988.

The conversion of the 72 km (45 mi) long Alipurduar-Bamanhat branch line to 1,676 mm (5 ft 6 in) 5 ft 6 in (1,676 mm) broad gauge in 2007, and its subsequent recommissioning, had a station at New Gitaldaha.
