= Bamanhat railway station =

Railway station in West Bengal, India

Bamanhat

General information
- Location: Village: Bamanhat, PS: sahebganj, District: Cooch Behar, West Bengal; India
- Coordinates: 26.0706°N 89.5862°E
- Elevation: 38 metres (125 ft)
- System: Indian Railways station
- Line: Alipurduar–Bamanhat branch line
- Platforms: 3
- Tracks: 3

Construction
- Structure type: At grade
- Parking: Not required

Other information
- Station code: BXT
- Zone(s): North East Frontier Railway
- Division(s): Alipurduar

History
- Former names: Eastern Bengal Railway

Services
Preceding station	Indian Railways	Following station
New Gitaldaha towards ?	Northeast Frontier Railway zone Alipurduar–Bamanhat branch line	Terminus
Location
- Location within West Bengal Location within India

Bamanhat railway station serves the town of Bamanhat lying in Alipurduar–Bamanhat branch line, Cooch Behar district in the Indian state of West Bengal. The station is part of Alipurduar railway division of Northeast Frontier Railway zone.

== Trains ==
=== Major trains ===
- Sealdah-Bamanhat Uttar Banga Express
- Siliguri Bamanhat Intercity Express.

Apart from these major trains, some local and DEMU trains too originates from Bamanhat and connects different parts of North Bengal.

== History ==
Places in the south-eastern portion of Dinhata subdivision in Cooch Behar district, western part of Dhubri district, northern part of Kurigram district and northern part of Lalmonirhat district, all linked with development of railways in the area

CT: census town, R: rural/ urban centre, RS: railway station
Owing to space constraints in the small map, the actual locations in a larger map may vary slightly

Before partition of India in 1947, there was a rail link to Lalmonirhat Junction, now in Bangladesh, through Geetaldaha and Mogalhat. Even in 1955 the line was there when there were talks between India and Pakistan for resumption of rail links. Up to the 1960s there was a railway link from Cooch Behar to Dhubri via Golokganj. It was then known as the Assam Line Railway Service. The links were disturbed with bridges being washed away. The entire area had metre-gauge tracks. Northeast Frontier Railway converted the Alipurduar–Bamanhat branch line to 5 ft 6 in (1,676 mm) broad gauge in 2007. The Alipuduar-Bamanhat branch line up to Geetaldaha was earlier part of Cooch Behar State Railway. The Geetaldaha-Bamanhat sector was part of what was called the Assam Line Railway Service.

Prior to the partition of India, the prestigious Assam Mail used to travel from Santahar to Guwahati.

The map alongside presents the position as it stands today (2020). The international border was not there when the railways were first laid in the area in the 19th-20th century. It came up in 1947. Since then, it has been an effort to live up to the new realities. The map is 'Interactive' (the larger version) – it means that all the places shown in the map are linked in the full screen map.

== Station ==
It is located near the India–Bangladesh border and handles around 15,000 passengers daily.
