= Burimari–Lalmonirhat–Parbatipur line =

Railway line in Bangladesh

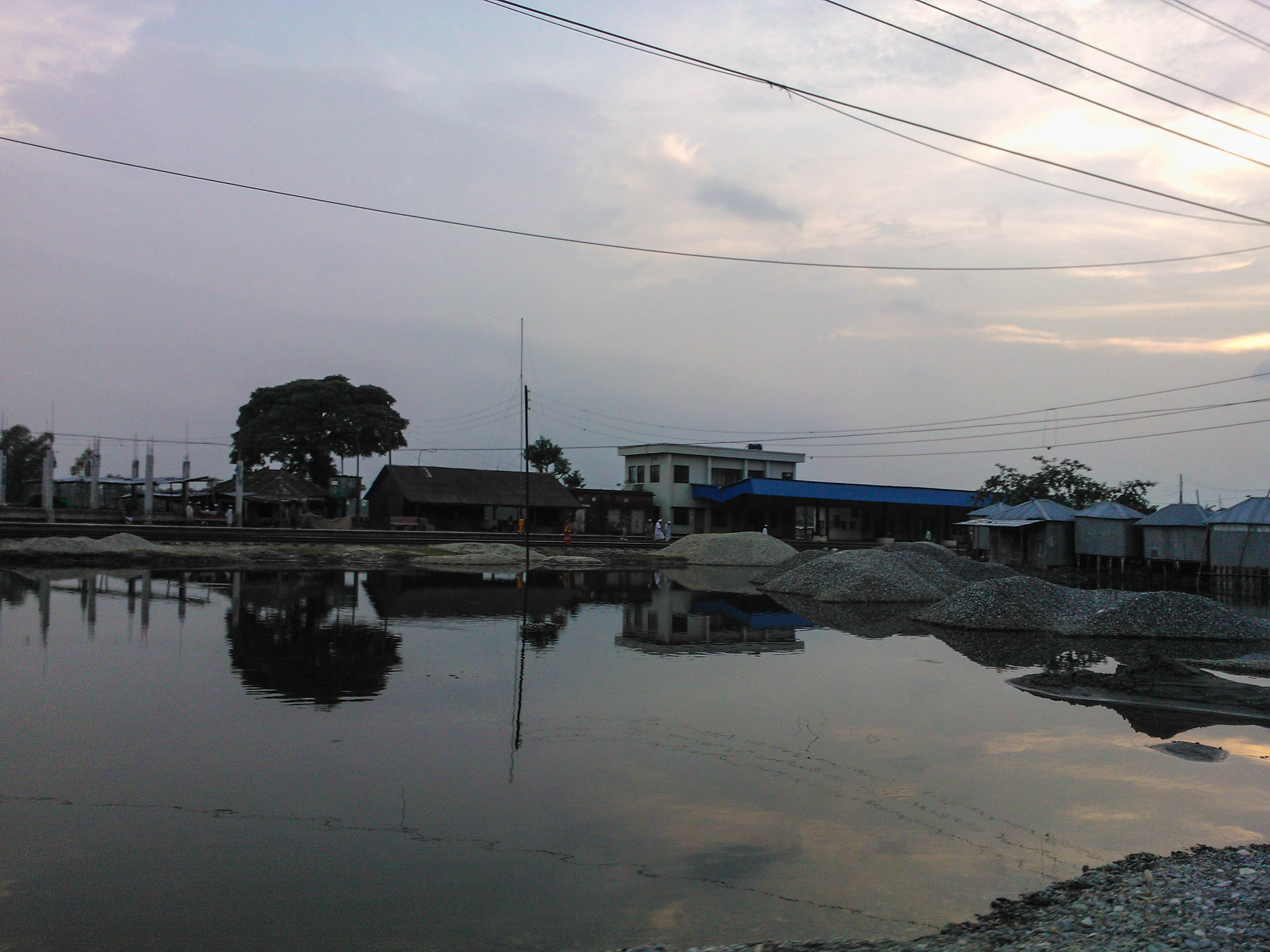
- Burimari railway station

Overview
- Status: Operational
- Owner: Bangladesh Railway
- Locale: Bangladesh
- Termini: Burimari; Parbatipur
- Stations: 23

History
- Opened: 1878

Technical
- Line length: 163.4 kilometres (101.5 mi)
- Track gauge: 1,000 mm (3 ft 3 3/8 in) metre gauge&1,676 mm (5 ft 6 in)

The Burimari–Lalmonirhat–Parbatipur line is a 163.4 kilometres (101.5 mi) long railway line connecting Burimari and Parbatipur Junction in northern Bangladesh. It also connects to Kurigram and Ramna Bazar. This track is under the jurisdiction of Bangladesh Railway.

== History ==
Once Parbatipur came up as a railway station on the Chilahati-Parbatipur-Santahar-Darshana Line in 1876, it became a centre of further railway development. There were two developments, one eastward and the other westward. North Bengal State Railway opened a metre gauge line to Kaunia in 1879. Two narrow gauge lines were laid by Eastern Bengal Railway from Kaunia to Dharla River, thereby creating the Kaunia–Dharlla State Railway. The Kaunia Dharla railway lines were converted to metre gauge in 1901. The Kaunia–Dharla line was extended to Amingaon in 1908. The Assam Behar State Railway started building westward in 1884 and by 1889, Parbatipur was connected with Katihar in Bihar.

By the turn of the century Lalmonirhat Junction had emerged as an important railway centre. Bengal Dooars Railway constructed a line to Malbazar. Cooch Behar State Railway constructed the Geetaldaha-Jayanti narrow gauge line. Links were established with Assam, with the Golokganj–Amingaon line coming up.

== Assam links ==
There were two Assam links through this area, before the Partition of India.

The first and more important one was through Mogalhat–Geetaldaha–Coochbehar–Golokganj. Even when railway links were restored between Pakistan and India in 1955, the line was in order and was one of the agreed transit points. The railway bridge across the Dharla River was subsequently partially washed out and the railway link was snapped.

The second link through Geetaldaha-Bamanhat-Golokganj was snapped earlier with a bridge being washed away within what is now Bangladesh. In 1955, the link was not there.

== Defunct rail transit point ==
The Burimari–Changrabandha rail transit point has become functional. The Indian side of the line is now made BG and is operational between New Mal Junction to Changrabandha. New line has been made to connect New Cooch Behar from Changrabandha.

But the other side was Dual gauge line is fully constructed to Lalmonirhat in 2012. Now there are 8 trains running daily to different cities. Total nine station of this section are remodeled. Bangladesh now making the whole section DG to revive this route. A bridge in River Dharla is being constructed for this.
