= Alipurduar–Bamanhat branch line =

Railway route in India

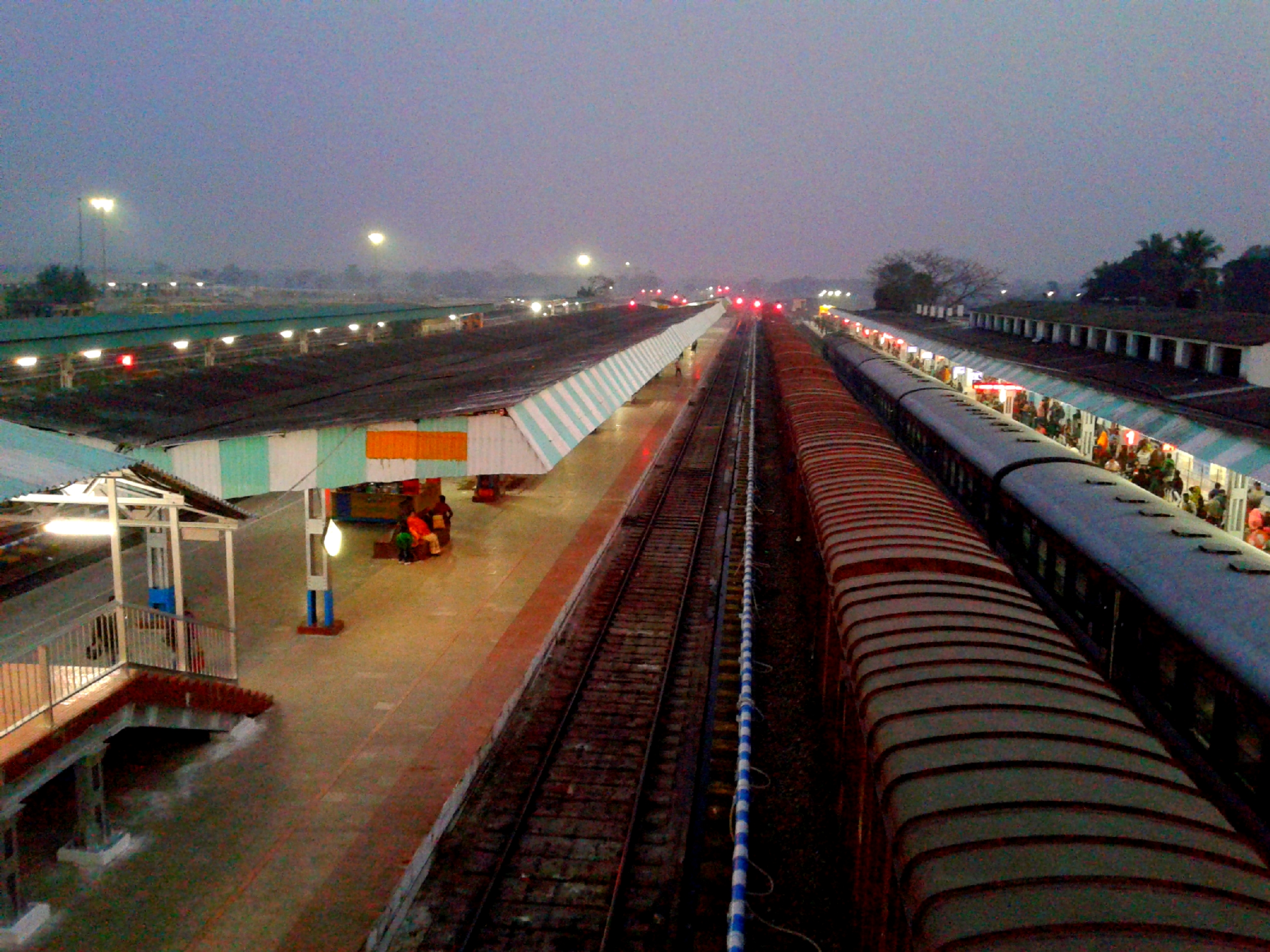
- New Cooch Behar Junction is an important railway station at Alipurduar–Bamanhat branch line

Overview
- Status: Operational
- Owner: Indian Railways
- Locale: West Bengal
- Termini: Alipurduar Junction; Bamanhat

Service
- Type: Rail line
- Operator(s): Northeast Frontier Railway

History
- Opened: 1894 onwards

Technical
- Track length: 72.25 kilometres (44.89 mi)
- Track gauge: 5 ft 6 in (1,676 mm) broad gauge
- Old gauge: Narrow gauge 762 mm (2 ft 6 in) (1894–1910); Metre gauge 1,000 mm (3 ft 3 3/8 in) (1910–2007)
- Electrification: Yes
- Operating speed: 100 kilometres per hour (62 mph)

The Alipurduar–Bamanhat branch line is an Indian railway line connecting Alipurduar Junction with Bamanhat. This 72-kilometre (45 mi) track is under the jurisdiction of Northeast Frontier Railway.

== History ==
=== Cooch Behar State Railway ===
The Cooch Behar State Railway (CBSR) was a 762 mm (2 ft 6 in) narrow gauge railway line that was built between Jayanti in the current Alipurduar district of West Bengal, India to Lalmonirhat in the current Lalmonirhat district in Bangladesh before partition between 1893 and 1898. The line originated from Jayanti near the foothills of Eastern Himalayas and went via Alipurduar, Cooch Behar, Dinhata and Gitaldaha to finally join the narrow-gauge track of Kaunia–Dharlla State Railway at Mogalhat. This line was later brought by Eastern Bengal Railway in 1899.

=== Eastern Bengal Railway ===
The Kaunia–Dharlla State Railway was constructed as a narrow-gauge line from Teesta railway junction to Mogalhat in 1882 by Eastern Bengal Railway. As a part of linking with the 581 kilometres (361 mi) long Katihar–Raiganj–Dinajpur–Parbatipur–Rangpur–Kaunia main metre-gauge line the Kaunia–Mogalhat–Gitaldaha NG section was converted to metre gauge from 1901 to 1902. The 25.27 kilometres (15.70 mi) long Gitaldaha-Golakganj section was built as a part of the main metre-gauge line in 1902 via Bamanhat & Sonahat. This metre-gauge line was further extended to Amingaon via Fakiragram & Kokrajhar in 1906. The Jayanti–Gitaldaha junction section was converted to metre gauge in 1910.

=== Post Partition ===
With the partition of India in 1947, the Assam links to Bengal were snapped. Further the Gitaldaha–Mogalhat rail transit point became defunct as floods washed away the railway bridge over Dharla River. The 72 kilometres (45 mi) Alipurduar–Bamanhat section and the 47.7 kilometres (29.6 mi) Fakiragram-Golakganj section were cut off as well and became isolated metre gauge sections. As a part of the Assam Link project a 301.8 kilometres (187.5 mi) line was constructed between Kishanganj and Fakiragram in 1948. Thus these 2 sections became branch lines. Fakiragram was connected with a new 57.6 kilometres (35.8 mi) line via Boxirhat to New Coochbehar in 2010–12.

== Gauge conversion ==
The Alipurduar–Bamanhat branch line was converted from metre gauge to broad gauge and was reopened to public in 2007. A new station called the New Gitaldaha station was built to be used instead of the old Gitaldaha junction. The Fakiragram–Golakganj–Dhubri section was converted from metre gauge to broad gauge during 2010. Golakgunj was linked with New Cooch Behar with a new line in 2012 as a part of the New Maynaguri-Abhayapuri project.

== New Developments ==
Bamanhat - Tufanganj, Dinhata - Chapaguri, New Changrabandha -Mekliganj & Mathabhanga - Sitai new Railway lines are planned for passenger & security purposes. Survey going on currently for New Changrabandha -Mekliganj & Mathabhanga - Sitai railway line.
