= New Cooch Behar Junction railway station =

Railway Station in West Bengal, India

NEW COOCH BEHAR JUNCTION

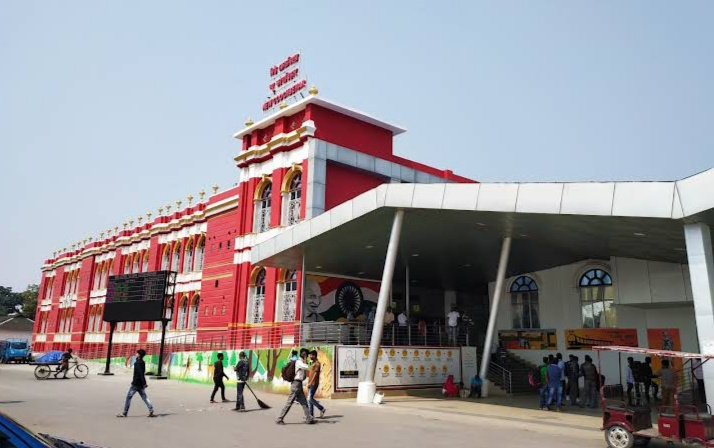

General information
- Location: Cooch Behar, West Bengal; India
- Coordinates: 26°21′10″N 89°28′10″E
- Elevation: 46 m (151 ft)
- System: Express train, Passenger train & Freight train station
- Operator: Northeast Frontier Railway
- Lines: Barauni–Guwahati line; New Mal–Changrabandha–New Cooch Behar line; New Jalpaiguri–New Bongaigaon Line; Alipurduar–Bamanhat branch line; New Cooch Behar-Golokganj line
- Platforms: 7
- Tracks: 12
- Connections: Auto-rickshaw, E-rickshaw

Construction
- Structure type: At grade
- Parking: Available
- Cycle facilities: Available
- Accessible: Yes

Other information
- Status: Functioning
- Station code: NCB
- Zone(s): Northeast Frontier Railway
- Division(s): Alipurduar

History
- Opened: 1966
- Electrified: Yes (2021)
- Former names: Assam Bengal Railway

Passengers
- 40K/Day (▲ high)

Services
Location
- Location within India Location within West Bengal Location within India
- Interactive map of New Cooch Behar Junction

New Cooch Behar Junction railway station is the main railway station in the district of Cooch Behar. It serves Cooch Behar city of the district in the Indian state of West Bengal. It lies under Alipurduar railway division.

It is a junction station on the New Jalpaiguri–New Bongaigaon section of the Barauni–Guwahati line, New Mal–Changrabandha–New Cooch Behar line and Alipurduar–Bamanhat branch line of Northeast Frontier Railway zone.

== History ==
Cooch Behar had its first railway when Cooch Behar State Railway constructed the narrow gauge Geetaldaha-Jainti line in 1901. It was subsequently on the metre gauge Alipurduar-Bamanhat-Golokganj line. When Assam Link Project constructed the link through North Bengal, it used the longer New Jalpaiguri–Alipurduar–Samuktala Road line.

New Cooch Behar station came up when the broad gauge New Jalpaiguri–New Bongaigaon section of Barauni–Guwahati line was laid in 1966.

Before partition there was a railway link from Cooch Behar to Dhubri via Gitaldaha and Golokganj. Some part of this route passed through Bangladesh, between Dinhata and Golokganj. There were two stations Pateswari and Sonahat which were in Bangladesh, these functioned even after partition. However, the collapse of the rail-cum-road bridge over the Gadadhar in the seventies ended that link. Now the bridge has been rebuilt and a new broad-gauge track has been laid, under New Maynaguri-Jogighopa Rail Project, via Tufangunj and Boxirhat, entirely through Indian territory. Dhubri-New Jalpaiguri Inter-city Express via Cooch Behar was introduced in February 2012. A new railway link from New Cooch Behar to New Jalpaiguri via Mathabhanga opened shortly.

== Facilities ==
The entire compound of New Cooch Behar Railway Station is equipped with free high-speed Wi-Fi services provided by RailTel. New facilities include a Food Lounge, Air-Conditioned Dormitory and an Air-Conditioned Waiting Hall. The station has a One Station One Product outlet offering handmade jewellery, jute products and handloom textiles to provide a market for local and indigenous products.

To increase mobility among passengers especially physically challenged passengers, elevators have been installed in Platform 1, 2, 3 and 4. An escalator has also been installed in Platform 1 connecting to the foot overbridge.

Toilets are now equipped with modern sanitary fittings and have exclusive facilities for male, female and physically challenged. There are numerous Pay-and-Use Toilets in the station. Special Waiting halls for ladies have also been built.

IRCTC offers online booking of Dormitory rooms and also allows online food ordering. There are over bridges connecting the different platforms. There are displays all over the railway station and numerous food and magazine vendors in every platform.

== Electrification ==
The Union Minister of Railways announced a 126 km (78 mi) long electrified section between New Jalpaiguri to New Cooch Behar. Northern Frontier Railways has made a significant achievement in providing a pollution-free green mode of transport as electrification of total 334 km (208 mi) of track has been completed during the financial year 2020–21, despite the COVID-19 epidemic, railway electrification work in various sections of the North Frontier Railway was being done rapidly. The Electrification was inspected by the Commissioner of Railway Safety of Northeast Frontier Railway zone. Test runs have been conducted in early 2021. As of September 2021, the station is fully electrified and electric trains are operational.

Preceding station	Indian Railways	Following station
New Baneswar towards ?	Northeast Frontier Railway zone New Jalpaiguri–New Bongaigaon section	Pundibari towards ?
Baneswar towards ?	Northeast Frontier Railway zone Alipurduar–Bamanhat branch line	Cooch Behar towards ?
Chapaguri towards ?	Northeast Frontier Railway zone New Maynaguri–Jogighopa line	Maradanga towards ?

== Major trains ==
1. Kamakhya–Howrah Vande Bharat Sleeper Express
2. New Jalpaiguri - Guwahati Vande Bharat Express
3. Agartala Tejas Rajdhani Express
4. Dibrugarh Rajdhani Express
5. Sairang–Anand Vihar Terminal Rajdhani Express
6. Agartala - Sir M. Visvesvaraya Terminal Humsafar Express
7. Naharlagun - New Delhi AC Superfast Express
8. Agartala - Lokmanya Tilak Terminus AC Superfast Express
9. Kamakhya - Sir M. Visvesvaraya Terminal AC Superfast Express
10. Guwahati - New Delhi Poorvattar Sampark Kranti Superfast Express
11. Silchar–New Delhi Poorvottar Sampark Kranti Superfast Express
12. Silchar - Thiruvananthapuram Aronai Superfast Express
13. Silchar - Coimbatore Superfast Express
14. Silchar–Secunderabad Express
15. Silchar - Sealdah Kanchanjunga Express
16. Dibrugarh–Kanyakumari Vivek Express
17. Dibrugarh–Amritsar Express
18. Dibrugarh–Chandigarh Express
19. Dibrugarh - Lokmanya Tilak Terminus Superfast Express
20. Dibrugarh-Lalgarh Avadh Assam Express
21. Dibrugarh - Gomti Nagar Amrit Bharat Express
22. Dibrugarh–Kolkata Superfast Express
23. Dibrugarh- Howrah Kamrup Express
24. Dibrugarh- Rajendra Nagar Express
25. Dibrugarh - Deogarh Express
26. Silghat Town - Tambaram Nagaon Express
27. Silghat Town - Kolkata Kaziranga Express
28. Agartala - Firozpur Tripura Sundari Express
29. Agartala - Deoghar Weekly Express
30. Agartala - Sealdah Kanchanjunga Express
31. Agartala - Kolkata Garib Rath Express
32. New Tinsukia–SMVT Bengaluru Superfast Express
33. New Tinsukia–Rajendra Nagar Weekly Express
34. New Tinsukia–Tambaram Express
35. New Tinsukia - Darbhanga Jivacch Link Express
36. Guwahati - Jammu Tawi Lohit Express
37. Guwahati- Sir M. Visvesvaraya Terminal Kaziranga Superfast Express
38. Guwahati - Bikaner Express
39. Guwahati - Okha Dwarka Express
40. Guwahati - Barmer Express
41. Guwahati-Jammu Tawi Amarnath Express
42. Guwahati - Lokmanya Tilak Terminus Express
43. Guwahati-Howrah Saraighat Superfast Express
44. Guwahati - Kolkata Garib Rath Express
45. Kamakhya–Shri Mata Vaishno Devi Katra Express
46. Kamakhya–Gandhidham Superfast Express
47. Kamakhya - Charlapalli Amrit Bharat Express
48. Kamakhya - Jodhpur, Bhagat Ki Kothi Express
49. Kamakhya - Delhi Brahmaputra Mail
50. Kamakhya - Puri Express (via Adra)
51. Kamakhya–Gaya Express
52. Kamakhya - Delhi Northeast Express
53. Kamakhya–Rohtak Amrit Bharat Express
54. Kamakhya - Pune Express
55. New Alipurduar - Sealdah Padatik Superfast Express
56. Silchar-Trivandrum Superfast Express
57. Bamanhat - Sealdah Uttar Banga Express
58. New Jalpaiguri - Guwahati Express
59. New Jalpaiguri - Bongaigaon Express
60. New Alipurdiar - Sealdah Teesta Torsha Express
61. New Alipurduar - SMVT Bangalore Amrit Bharat Express
62. Kolkata–Sairang Express
63. Alipurduar–Silghat Town Rajya Rani Express
64. Alipurduar–Kamakhya Intercity Express
65. Siliguri–Bamanhat Express

== See also ==
- North Eastern Railway Connectivity Project
- North Western Railway zone
