= Cooch Behar railway station =

Railway station in West Bengal, India

COOCHBEHAR

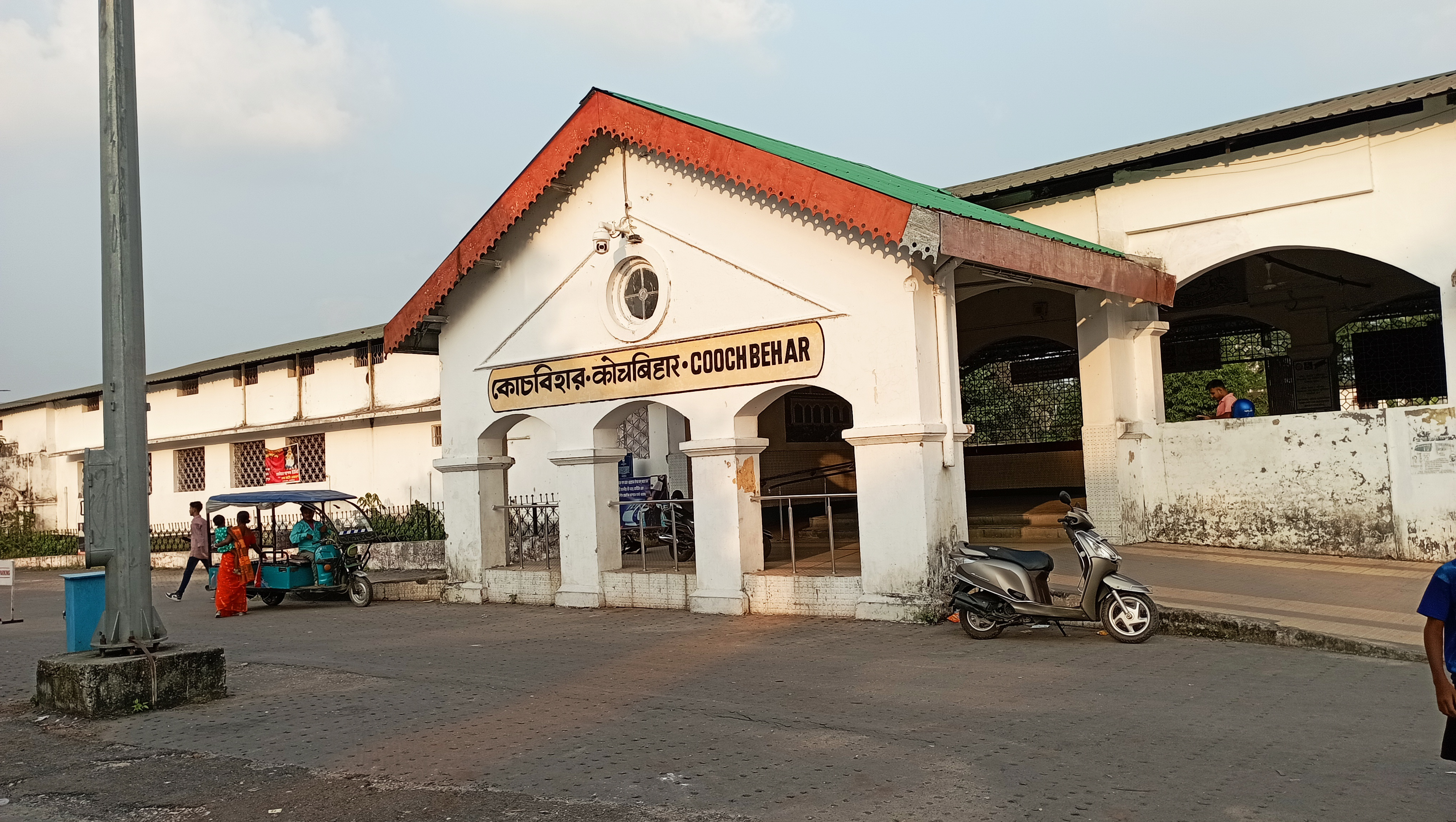

General information
- Location: Cooch Behar, West Bengal; India
- Elevation: 42 metres (138 ft)
- System: Passenger train station
- Operator: Northeast Frontier Railway
- Line: Alipurduar–Bamanhat branch line
- Platforms: 1
- Tracks: 1
- Connections: E-rickshaw, Bus

Construction
- Structure type: At grade
- Parking: Available
- Cycle facilities: Available
- Accessible: Yes

Other information
- Status: Functioning
- Station code: COB
- Zone(s): Northeast Frontier Railway
- Division(s): Alipurduar

History
- Opened: 1901 (125 years ago)
- Former names: Cooch Behar State Railway

Services
Location
- Location within West Bengal

Cooch Behar railway station (also referred to as Old Cooch Behar railway station) serves Cooch Behar in Cooch Behar district in the Indian state of West Bengal.

== History ==
Cooch Behar State Railway built a 2 ft 6 in (762 mm)-wide narrow-gauge railway from the southern bank of the Torsa opposite Cooch Behar town to Gitaldaha, a station on the tracks of Eastern Bengal Railway in 1894. Cooch Behar town was connected in 1901 after a bridge was built on the Torsa. It was converted to 1,000 mm (3 ft 3 3/8 in)-wide metre gauge in 1910. Northeast Frontier Railway converted the Alipurduar–Bamanhat branch line to 5 ft 6 in (1,676 mm) broad gauge in 2007.

== Infrastructure and amenities ==
The railway station is equipped with basic passenger facilities such as a waiting room and toilet. The station offers free Wi-Fi provided by RailTel. In 2023, a 'One Station One Product' store was opened to provide a market for local artisanship.

== Trains ==
Six trains stop at Cooch Behar railway station. Both up and down trains are mentioned below.

- 07513/07514 Siliguri-Bamanhat DEMU Special
- 05465/05466 Alipurduar Junction-Bamanhat Passenger Special
- 15467/15468 Siliguri-Bamanhat Intercity Express

Preceding station	Indian Railways	Following station
New Cooch Behar towards Alipurduar	Northeast Frontier Railway zone Alipurduar–Bamanhat branch line	Dewanhat towards Bamanhat

== Railway heritage museum ==
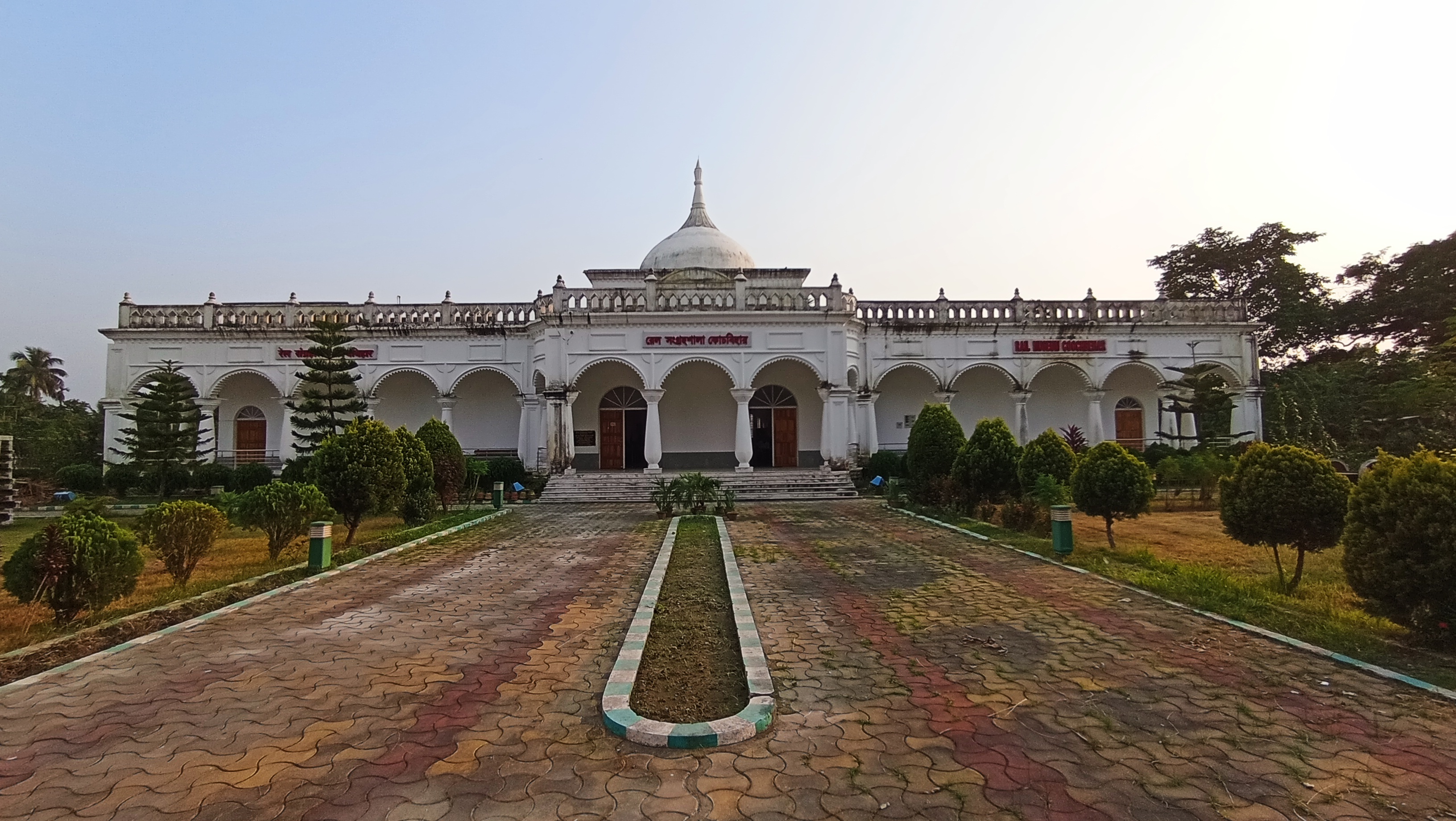
Façade of the Cooch Behar Railway Museum

The more than a century old Cooch Behar railway station has been accorded a heritage status and a new building was built to accommodate a Railway Heritage Museum. The railway museum is a minuscule version of the National Rail Museum located in New Delhi and is based on the architecture of the Madan Mohan temple in Cooch Behar.

There are four open galleries in the museum with different themes related to Indian Railways and Cooch Behar State Railway. The external garden area has numerous instruments and machinery related to railways. A coach restaurant was also inaugurated near the museum which was later closed due to operational reasons. The coach is now placed next to the railway station as a display.
