= Burimari railway station =

Railway station in Lalmonirhat District, Bangladesh

Burimari বুড়িমারী
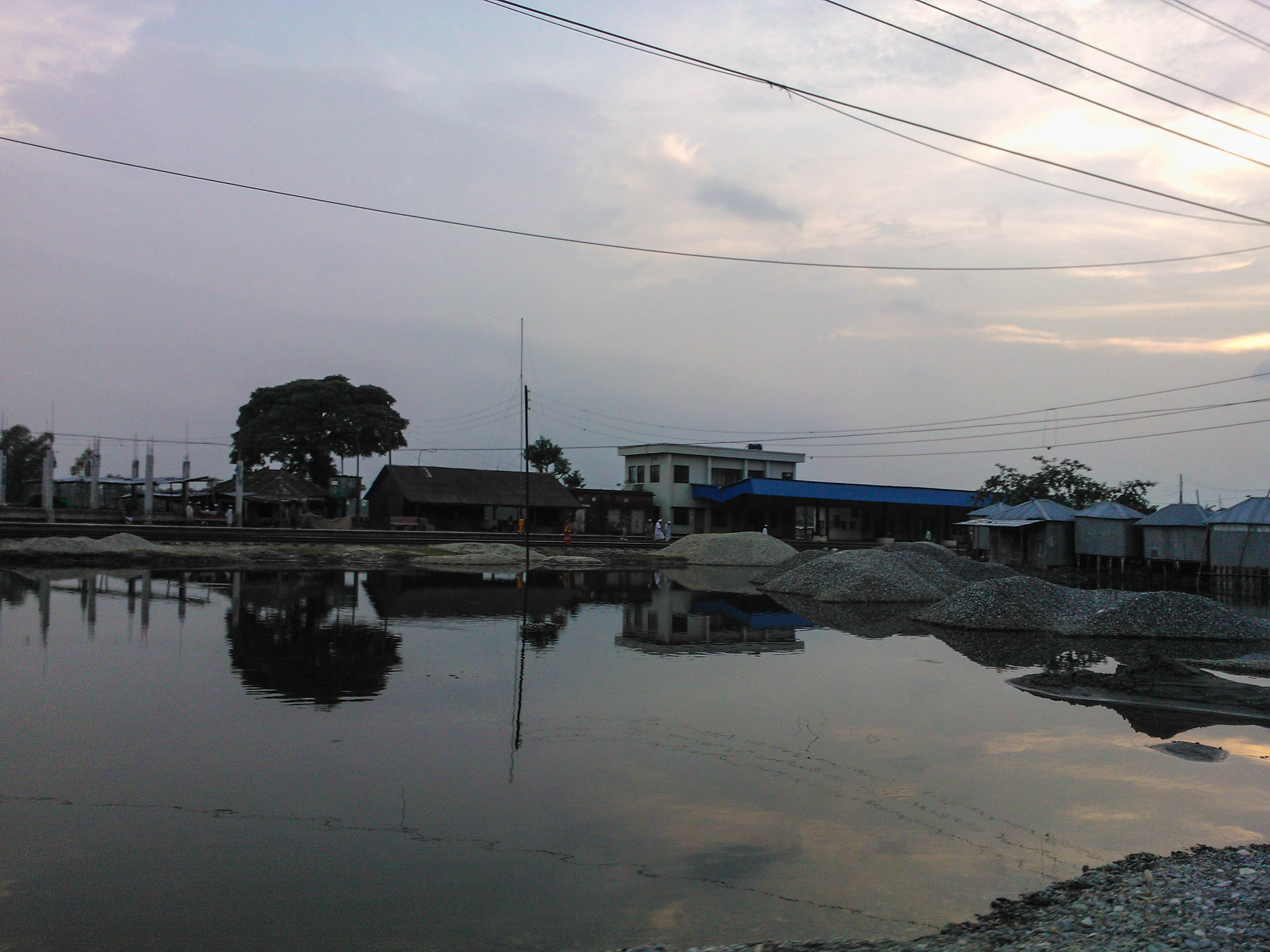
- Burimari railway station

General information
- Location: Lalmonirhat, Rangpur; Bangladesh
- Coordinates: 26°23′48″N 88°56′04″E
- Line: Burimari-Lalmonirhat-Parbatipur Line

Construction
- Structure type: Standard (on ground station)

Other information
- Status: Functioning

History
- Opened: 1900?
- Previous names: Bengal Dooars Railway
Location

Burimari (Bengali: বুড়িমারী) is a border railway station in Bangladesh, situated in Lalmonirhat District, in Rangpur Division. It is a land border crossing point and a defunct railway transit point on the Bangladesh-India border. The corresponding point on the Indian side is Changrabandha in Cooch Behar district.

== History ==
The Lalmonirhat-Malbazar metre gauge line was developed by the Bengal Dooars Railway in the closing years of the nineteenth century. With the partition of India in 1947, the Indian side of the line terminated at Changrabandha and the Pakistani side, later Bangladeshi side, at Burimari.

== Present status ==
The line between New Mal Jn. and Changrabandha is now (2016) converted to broad gauge. A pair of DMUs have been introduced on this route from Siliguri to Changrabandha via New Mal Jn from 20 January 2016.

The Karotoa Express runs daily between Burimari to Santahare Junction [via Gaibandha-Bogura) and Lalmonirhat railway station. There are 1 local and 2 commuter trains daily between Burimari and Lalmonirhat-Rangpur-Perbottipur.
