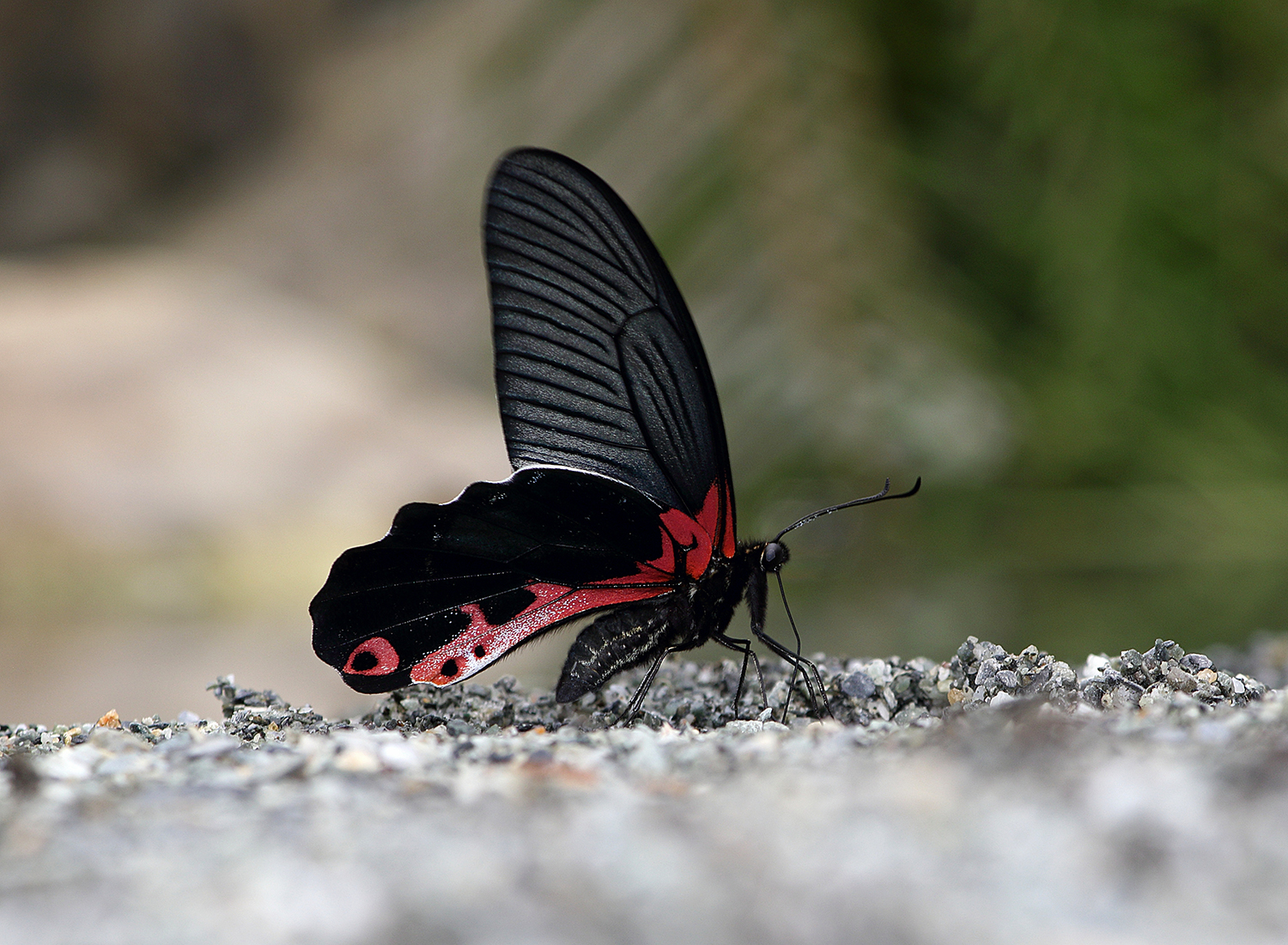
- Ventral view
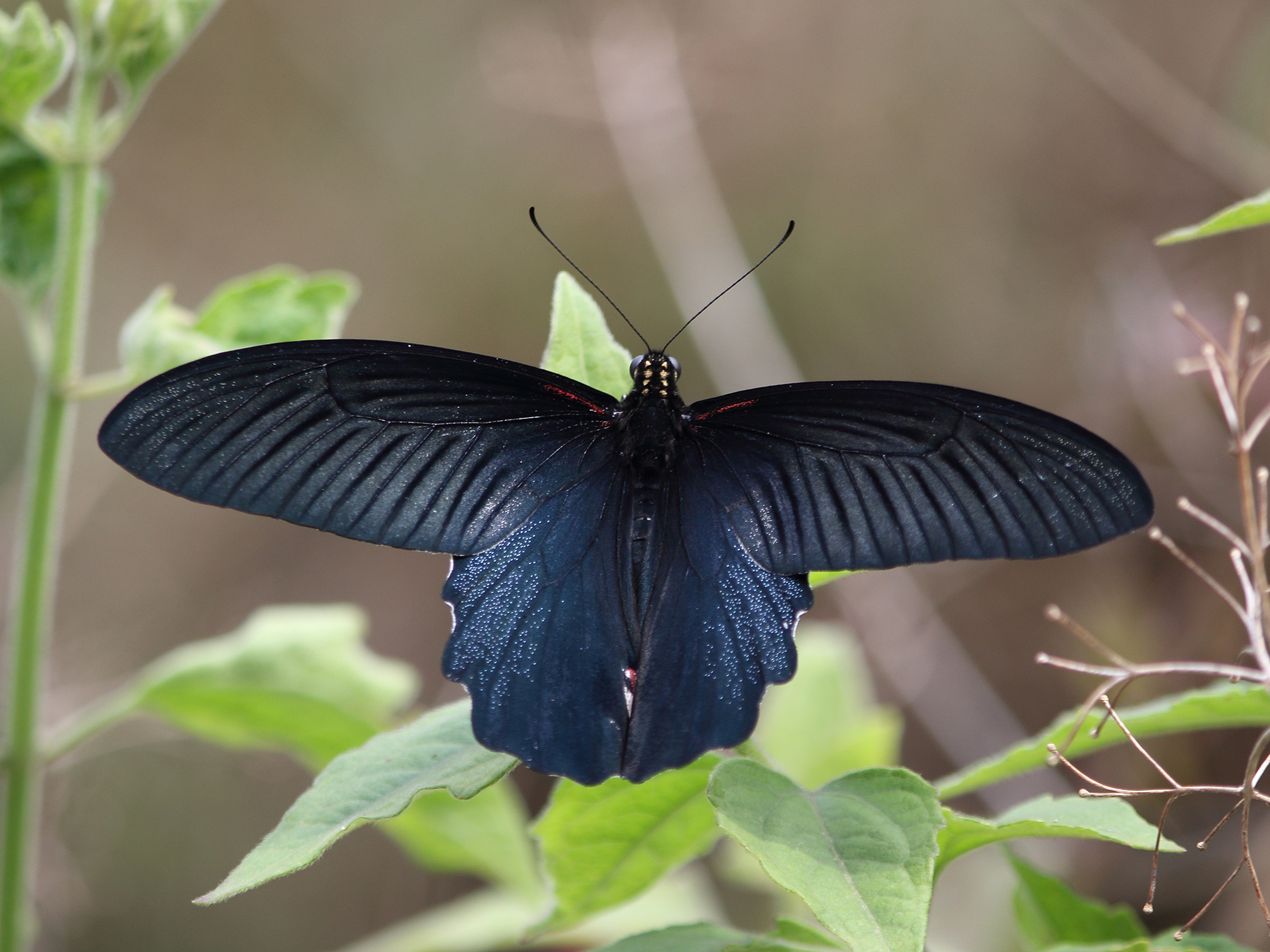
- Dorsal view

Scientific classification
- Domain: Eukaryota
- Kingdom: Animalia
- Phylum: Arthropoda
- Class: Insecta
- Order: Lepidoptera
- Family: Papilionidae
- Genus: Papilio
- Species: P. alcmenor

Binomial name
- Papilio alcmenor C. & Rudolf Felder, 1864

Synonyms
- Papilio rhetenor

= Papilio alcmenor =

Redbreast

Species of butterfly

Papilio alcmenor, the redbreast, is a species of swallowtail butterfly found in South Asia.

== Description ==
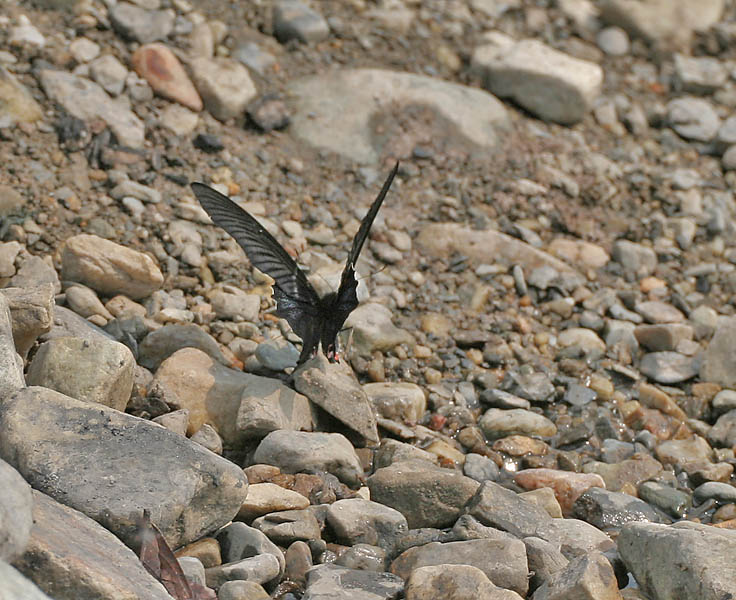
Male at Jayanti in Buxa Tiger Reserve in Jalpaiguri district of West Bengal, India

Male upperside black with, in some lights, an obscure dark indigo-blue tint. Forewing: a series of pale adnervular streaks not extended to the base or quite to the termen but that reach well into the apical half of the cell, and a short slender streak of red rarely absent at the extreme base of the subcostal vein. In certain specimens also the apical half or interspace 1a and of the posterior portion of interspace 1 are diffusely white. Hindwing uniform, towards the terminal or outer half sprinkled with bluish scales; an irregular incomplete white ring at the tornal angle that encloses a black spot bordered above by red.

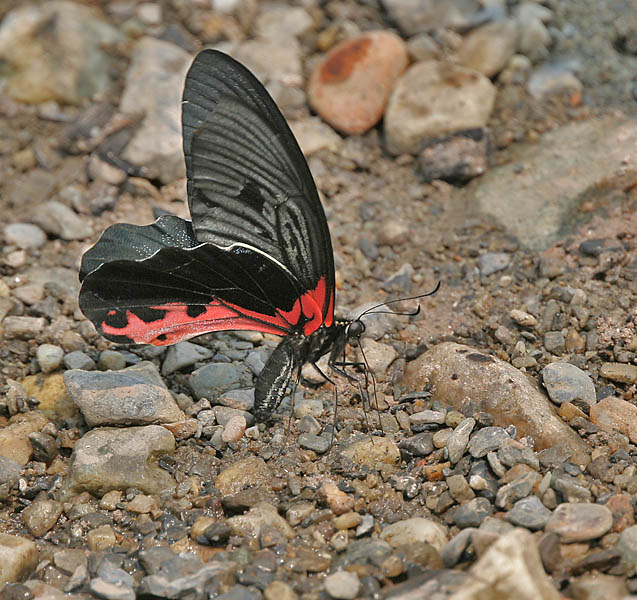
Male

Underside: forewing similar, buff with the pale adnervular streaks broader and much more prominent so that the wing has a general grey appearance; a patch of dark red at base traversed by the black veins. Hindwing deep indigo-blue black; a dark red patch at base as in the forewing, but continued along the dorsum, nearly filling interspaces 1 and 2; superposed on the red in the former are two black spots and some irregular white scaling, and in the latter three large black spots in succession from the base; in some specimens the apical two spots coalesce anteriorly, in others there is also a red lunule near the apex of interspace 5; lastly, a diffuse spot of blue scaling near apices of interspaces 6 and 7. Antennae, head, thorax and abdomen black, paler beneath.

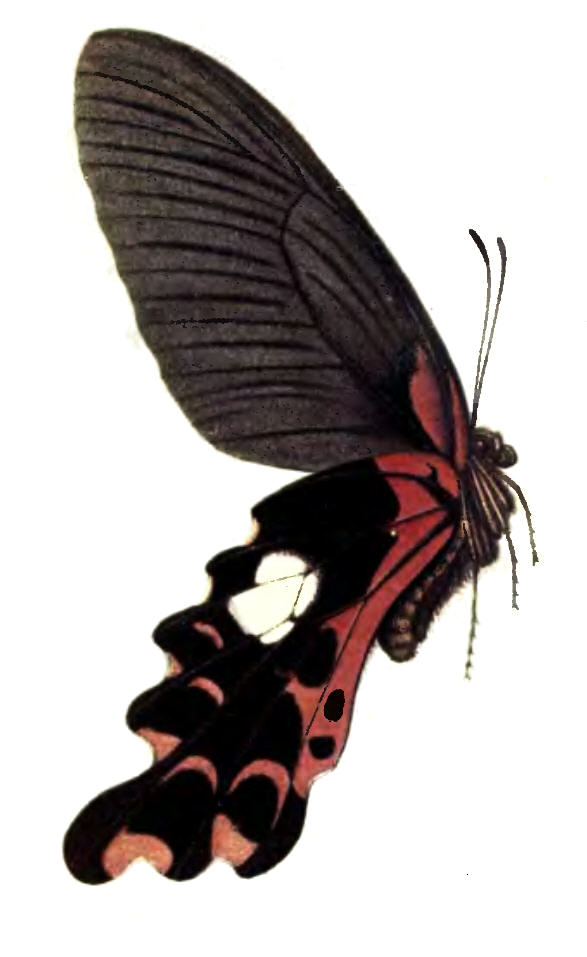
Female

Female upperside: ground colour duller black. Forewing: the adnervular streaks broader, paler, more prominent than in the male; the short red streak at base of subcostal vein broader. Hindwing: a medial patch of white that consists of an elongate spot at base of interspace 4, and a short streak that fills the basal half of interspace 5, extended diffusely into the apex of the cell and above into interspace 6; beyond this white patch is a discal series of three small red crescentic marks in interspaces 2, 4, and 5, or 2 and 4 only, followed by larger red lunules in interspaces 2 to 5, admarginal large red spots in 2 and 3, and a more or less large rectangular red spot centred with black at the tornal angle; cilia touched with white in the middle of the interspaces. The lunular red markings are very variable in number and are admarginal in interspaces 4 to 6. Underside, forewing: ground colour dull olivaceous black with the veins and internervular streaks velvety black, a red patch at base of cell. Hindwing: ground colour black; markings more or less similar to those on the upperside, but both the white and the red more extensive, the latter so disposed as to form a patch at base of wing and a broad dorsal border below the median vein and vein 3; in interspaces 1, 2, and 3 it is interrupted by large black spots. Antennae black; head, thorax and abdomen dull dark ochraceous brown.

== Range ==
North-eastern India, Nepal, Bhutan, Myanmar and China.

== Status ==
Common. Not threatened.

== See also ==
- Papilionidae
- List of butterflies of India
- List of butterflies of India (Papilionidae)

== Other reading ==
- Evans, W.H. (1932). The Identification of Indian Butterflies (2nd ed.). Mumbai, India: Bombay Natural History Society.
- Haribal, Meena (1992). The Butterflies of Sikkim Himalaya and Their Natural History. Gangtok, Sikkim, India: Sikkim Nature Conservation Foundation.
- Wynter-Blyth, Mark Alexander (1957). Butterflies of the Indian Region. Bombay, India: Bombay Natural History Society. ISBN 978-8170192329.

== Gallery ==
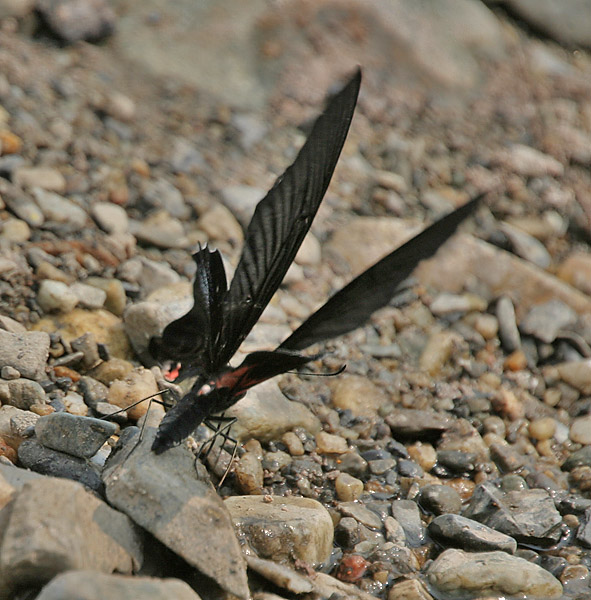
Male at Jayanti in Buxa Tiger Reserve in Jalpaiguri district of West Bengal, India

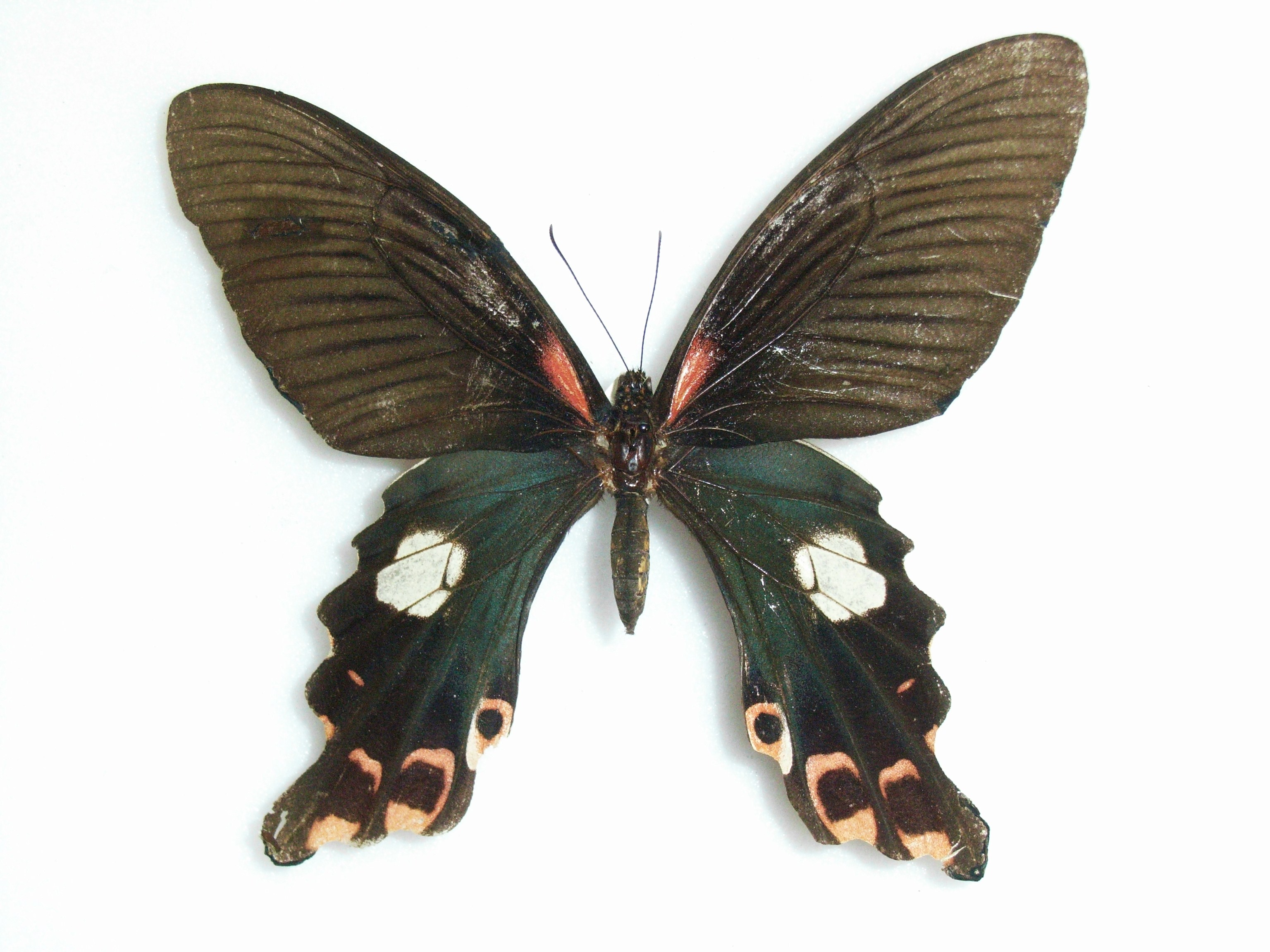
Mounted female

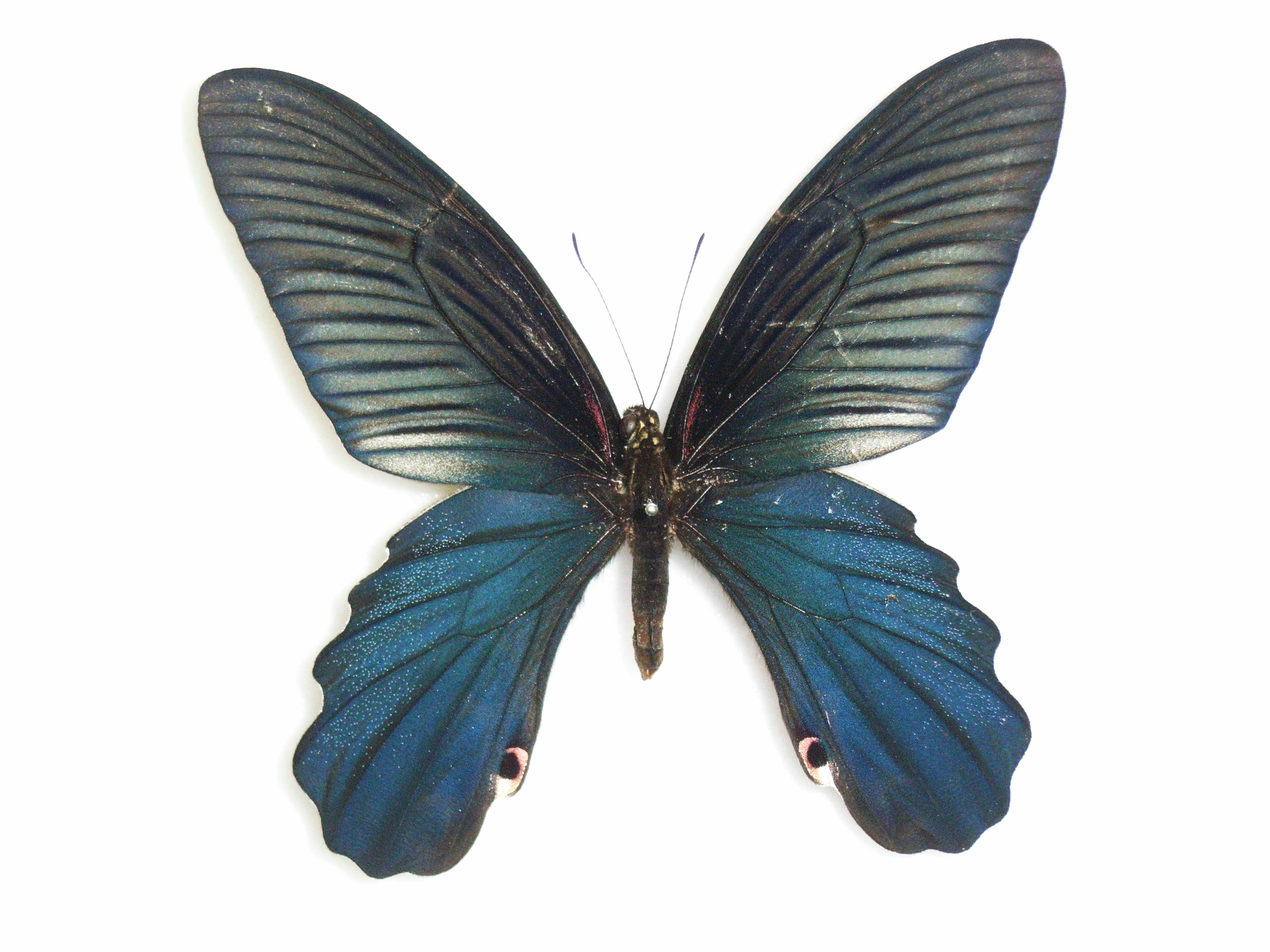
Mounted male
