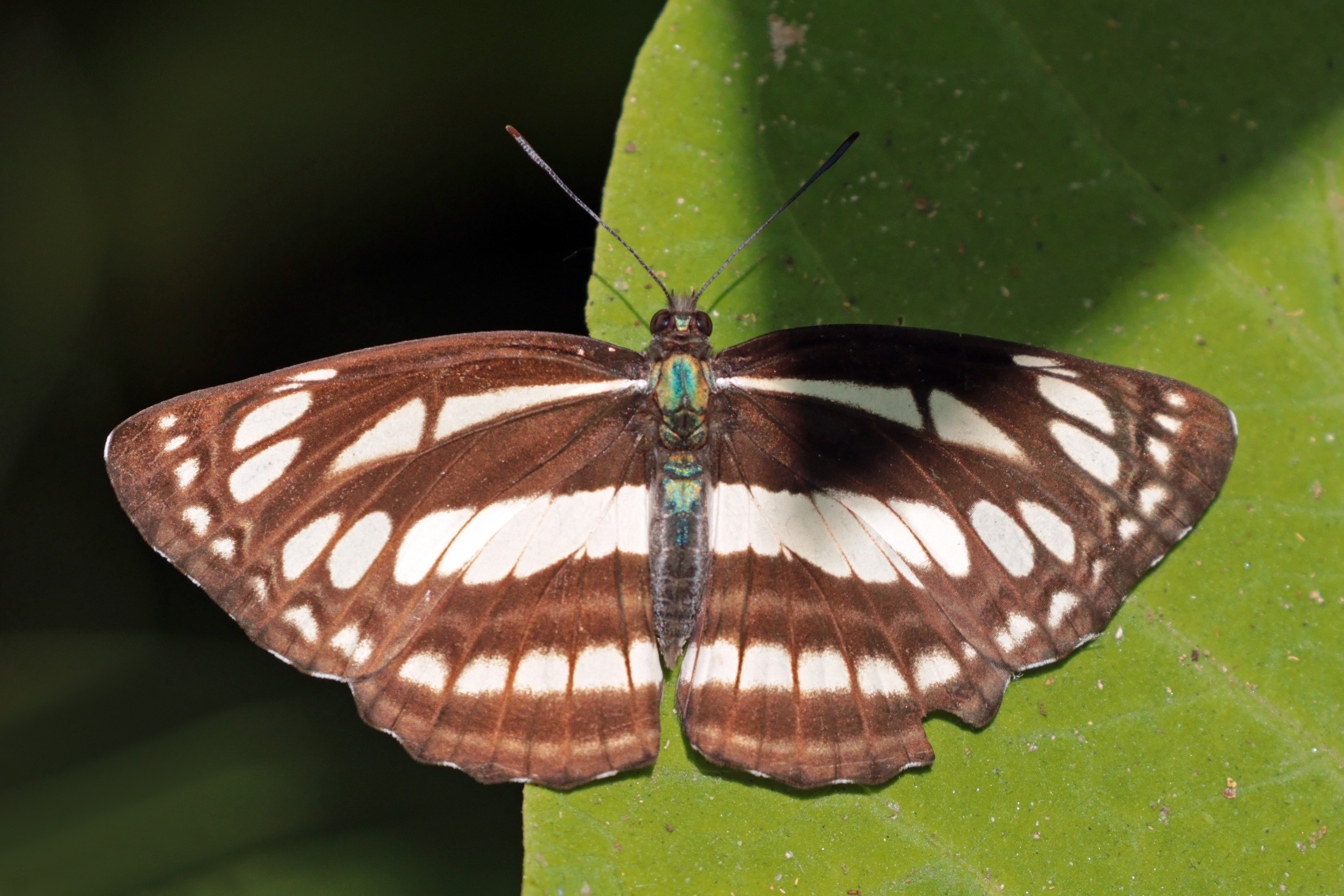

Scientific classification
- Kingdom: Animalia
- Phylum: Arthropoda
- Clade: Pancrustacea
- Class: Insecta
- Order: Lepidoptera
- Family: Nymphalidae
- Genus: Neptis
- Species: N. soma

Binomial name
- Neptis soma Linnaeus, 1758

= Neptis soma =

Sullied sailer

Species of butterfly

Neptis soma, the sullied sailer or the creamy sailer, is a species of nymphalid butterfly found in south and southeast Asia.

== Description ==
=== Wet-season form ===
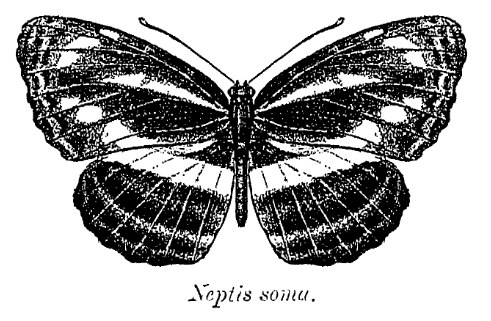

Males and females, upperside fuliginous black, with somewhat sullied white markings. Forewing: discoidal streak narrow, the apex truncate, triangular spot beyond narrow, very elongate; discal spots small, oval, all well separated; postdiscal transverse series of spots complete. Hindwing: subbasal band very narrow, slightly sinuous; discal and subterminal pale lines very obscure; postdiscal series of spots transverse, very narrow, often indicated only by a pale band.

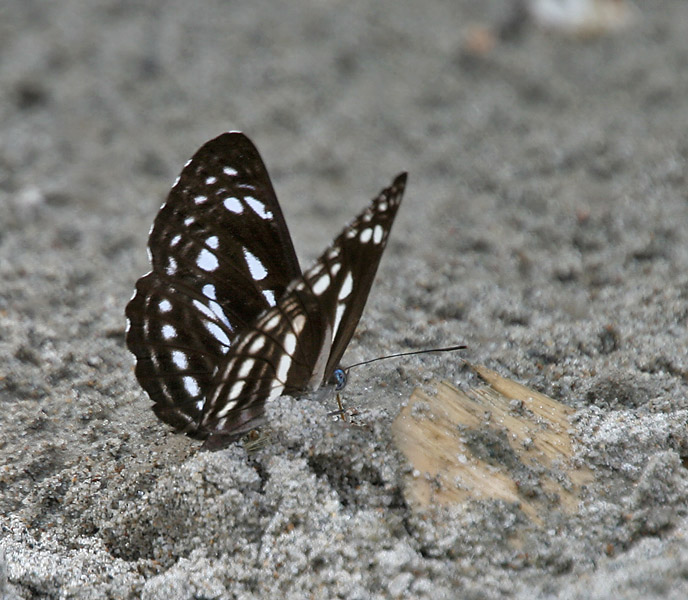
Dry-season form at Jayanti in Buxa Tiger Reserve in Jalpaiguri district of West Bengal, India

Underside chocolate reddish brown, markings as on the upperside, but broader and slightly diffuse. Forewing with the discoidal streak and the triangular spot beyond it diffusely connate (united with others), some transverse linear white markings on either side of the postdiscal series of spots; the wing below vein 1 pale greyish brown. Hindwing: the discal and subterminal pale markings of the upperside represented by more clearly defined, very narrow, white bands, with, in the female, the addition of a terminal white similar band. Antennae black; head, thorax and abdomen fuliginous black; beneath dusky white.

=== Dry-season form ===
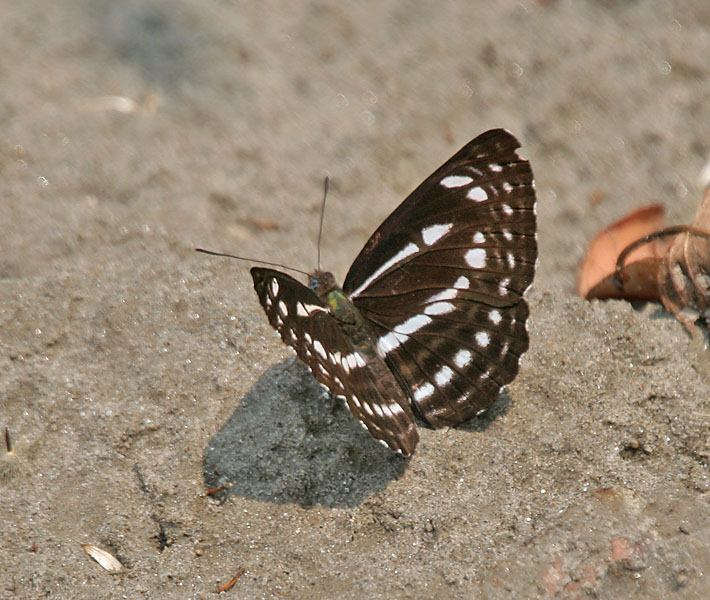
Dry-season form at Jayanti in Buxa Tiger Reserve

Males and females, upperside ground colour a more dusky fuliginous; the markings broader and slightly whiter, not sullied white. Underside: ground colour a shade brighter.

Race kallaura, Moore. Of this form I have seen only a few specimens. Judging by the types, which are now in the collection of the British Museum, it differs less from the typical form than do any of the other races. As in N. soma, the markings are small and narrow; the subbasal band of the hindwing is, however, attenuated at each end, and not of even width, underside: ground colour very much paler and somewhat ochraceous, the anterior and posterior sets of spots of the discal series closer together respectively; the postdiscal band on the hindwing equal in width to the subbasal band. Recorded only so far from Travancore.

Race hampsoni, Moore. Very closely allied to the typical form, but the markings pure white and broader in both seasonal forms, as in the race clinia. Upperside forewing: the spots of the discal series oval, outwardly rounded. Underside: ground colour dark ferruginous, the markings broad as on the upperside; the spots of the discal series, though closer to each other than in the typical form, still not connate, or forming an upper and lower band as in the race clinia. Recorded from the Nilgiris; Anaimalai Hills and Mysore.

== Subspecies ==
The subspecies of Neptis soma are:

- N. s. soma - Nepal, northeast India
- N. s. ominicola - China
- N. s. tushita - Siam
- N. s. acala - Tonkin
- N. s. shania - Myanmar, Thailand, China
- N. s. somaoides - Kawi
- N. s. pendleburyi - peninsular Malaya
- N. s. tayalina - Taiwan
- N. s. butleri - Pakistan - Nepal
- N. s. shirozui - Taiwan
- N. s. palnica - south India

== Gallery ==
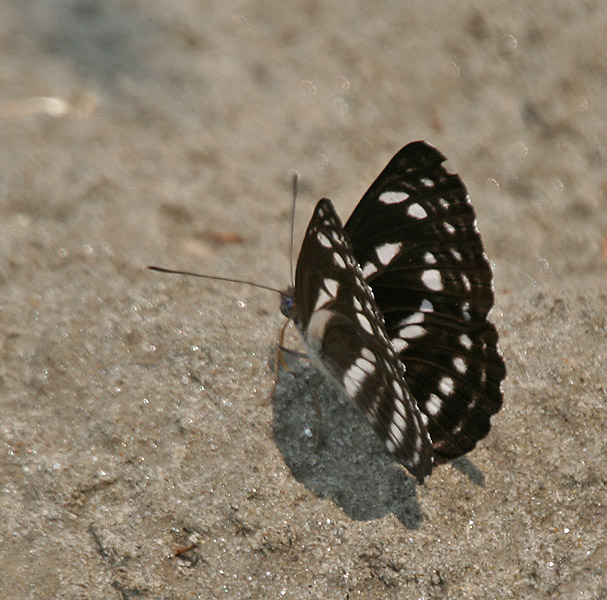
Dry-season form at Jayanti in Buxa Tiger Reserve in Jalpaiguri district of West Bengal

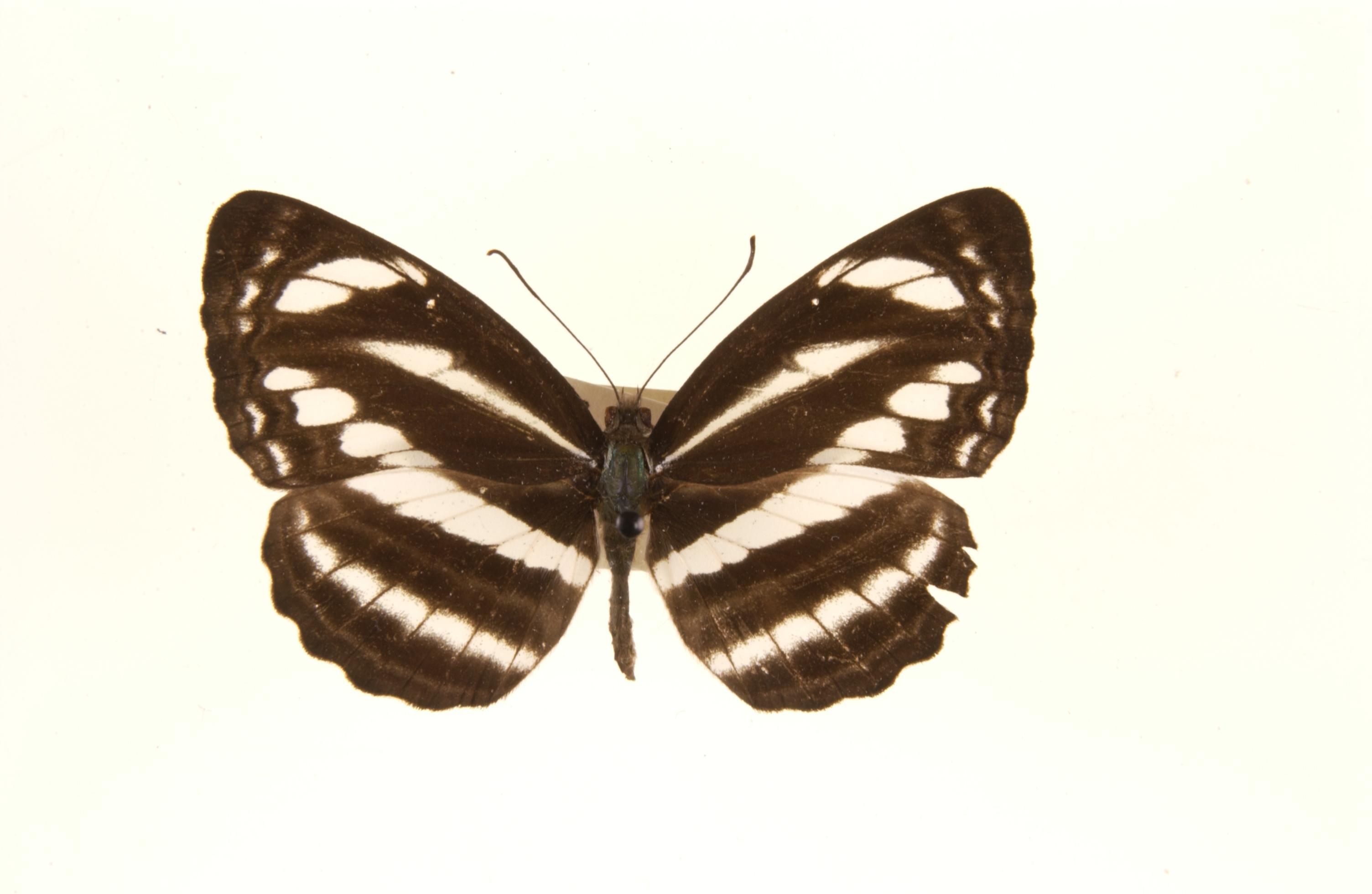
Museum specimen from Malaya

== See also ==
- List of butterflies of India
- List of butterflies of India (Nymphalidae)
