= Assam Mail =

Train in India

Overview
- Service type: Mail train

Route
- Termini: Santahar Junction (pre-independence); Delhi (post-independence); Amingaon (pre-independence); Guwahati(later extended to Dibrugarh in the post-independence era)
- Distance travelled: 506.7 kilometres (314.8 mi)(pre-independence); 2,601 kilometres (1,616 mi)(post-independence)
- Service frequency: Daily
- Train number: 3 Up/4 Dn (old)

On-board services
- Classes: General, Sleeper
- Sleeping arrangements: yes
- Catering facilities: Pantry car On-board catering E-catering.(post-independence)

Technical
- Track gauge: 1,000 mm (3 ft 3 3/8 in); 1,676 mm (5 ft 6 in)
- Operating speed: 36 kilometres per hour (22 mph)(pre-1947); 50 kilometres per hour (31 mph) North East Express (post-independence)

The Assam Mail was one of the better known metre-gauge trains in the Indian Railways system that was there from the pre-independence days. The train was discontinued in 1986 with the completion of the broad-gauge conversion of the metre-gauge line to Dibrugarh.

== 3 Up/ 4 Dn ==
Popularly known as 3 Up/ 4 Dn (Kalka Mail was 1 Up/ 2 Dn), it originally ran in the pre-independence days from Santahar Junction, now in Bangladesh, to Guwahati. It travelled along the Santahar–Kaunia line up to Kaunia, then to Lalmonirhat along Parbatipur–Lalmonirhat–Burimari line, crossing the Teesta. Thereafter, it took the now-defunct Mogalhat–Gitaldaha route crossing the Dharla over the bridge, part of which has since been washed away, on to Golokganj, Fakiragram Junction and Amingaon covering 506.7 kilometres (314.8 mi) in 14 hrs 00 mins at speed of 36 kilometres per hour (22 mph).

Passengers to and from Kolkata and the rest of India traveled between Kolkata and Santahar by broad-gauge Darjeeling Mail or some other connection and then switched over to metre-gauge Assam Mail.

== Post Independence ==
After independence and partition of India in 1947, the train travel to Assam stopped temporarily (possibly till 1950). When Assam Link Project connected Fakiragram to Kishanganj Assam Mail started running along the Katihar–Siliguri line. It needed a loco reversal at Siliguri Junction and traveled along what is now the New Jalpaiguri–Alipurduar–Samuktala Road line. Assam Mail was converted into a two part train. It ran from New Delhi to Dibrugarh (after Rajendra Setu and Saraighat Bridge came up), with the broad gauge part running up to Barauni from where the metre gauge part continued up to Dibrugarh. Passengers had to get down at Barauni and change trains.

The metre gauge part of the Assam Mail from Barauni to Dibrugarh covered 1,369 kilometres (851 mi). It was one of the longer metre gauge runs in the country, running across the flood plains of the Kosi, the Dooars, Western Assam and finally Upper Assam. In 1986, when the Barauni–Guwahati line was converted into broad gauge the Assam Mail was renamed as the North East Express. The new Superfast train North East Express was introduced via Kanpur, Patna, Barauni, Kishanganj, Fakiragram Junction, covering 1,890 kilometres (1,170 mi) between New Delhi & Guwahati in 33 hrs 15 mins at speed of 57 kilometres per hour (35 mph).
