= Uttar Banga Express =

Train in India

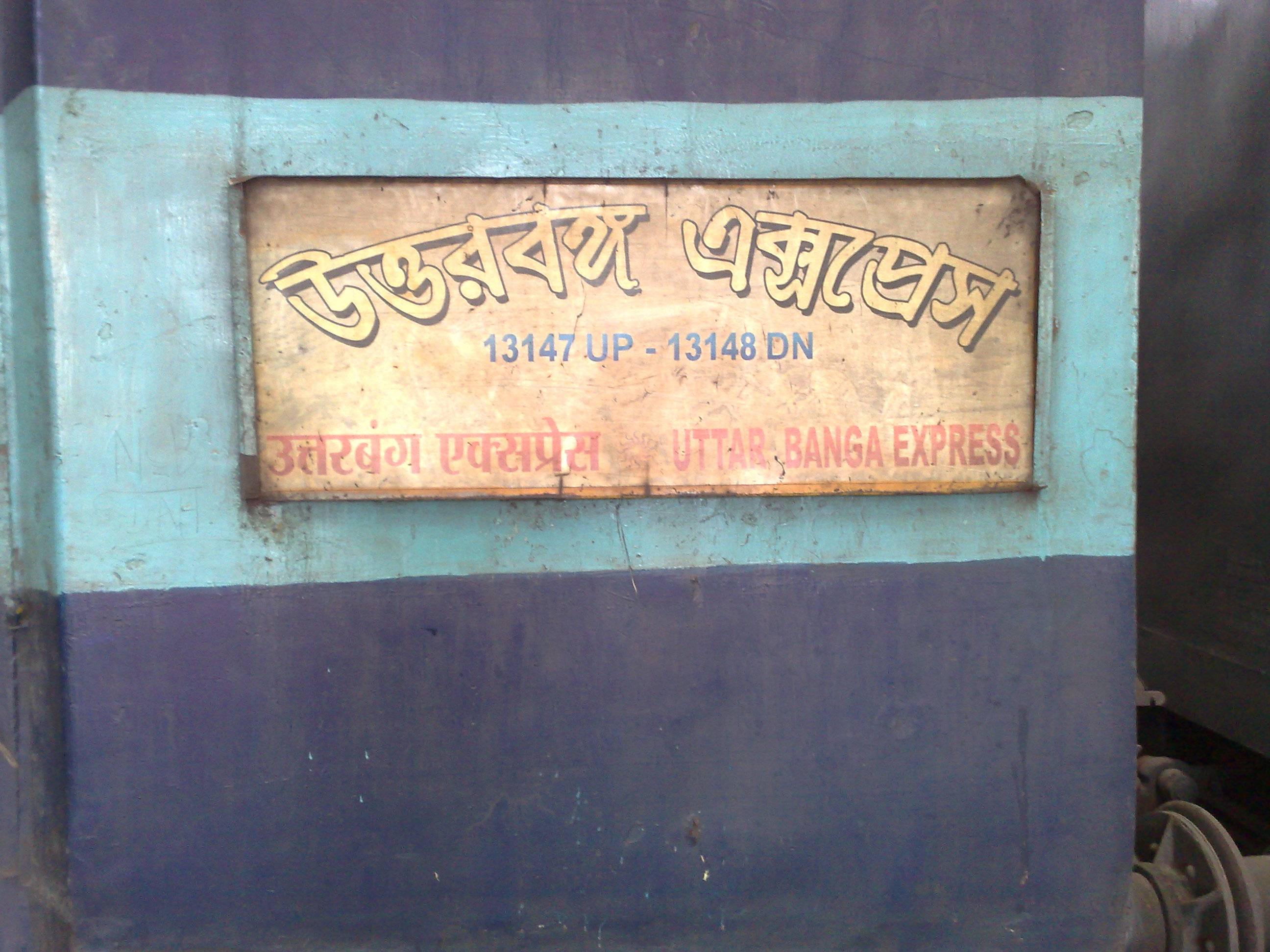

Overview
- Service type: Express
- Status: Operating
- First service: 15 April 2000; 26 years ago
- Current operator: Eastern Railway

Route
- Termini: Sealdah (SDAH); Bamanhat (BXT)
- Stops: 25
- Distance travelled: 748 km (465 mi)
- Average journey time: 15 hours 55 minutes
- Service frequency: Daily
- Train number: 13147 / 13148

On-board services
- Classes: AC 1 tier, AC 2 tier, AC 3 tier, Sleeper class, General Unreserved
- Seating arrangements: Yes
- Sleeping arrangements: Yes
- Catering facilities: On-board catering, E-catering
- Observation facilities: Large windows
- Baggage facilities: Below the seats

Technical
- Rolling stock: LHB coach
- Track gauge: 1,676 mm (5 ft 6 in)
- Operating speed: 130 km/h (81 mph) maximum, 50 km/h (31 mph) average including halts

The 13147 / 13148 Uttar Banga Express is a daily express train that runs between Sealdah & Bamanhat via Barddhaman, Bolpur, Rampurhat, Malda Town, New Jalpaiguri, Jalpaiguri Road railway station, New Cooch Behar. Uttar Banga Express was one of the two trains involved in the infamous Sainthia train collision at Sainthia, West Bengal.

It operates as train number 13147 from Sealdah to Bamanhat and as train number 13148 in the reverse direction, serving the state of West Bengal. Uttar Banga translates to North Bengal in Bengali language.

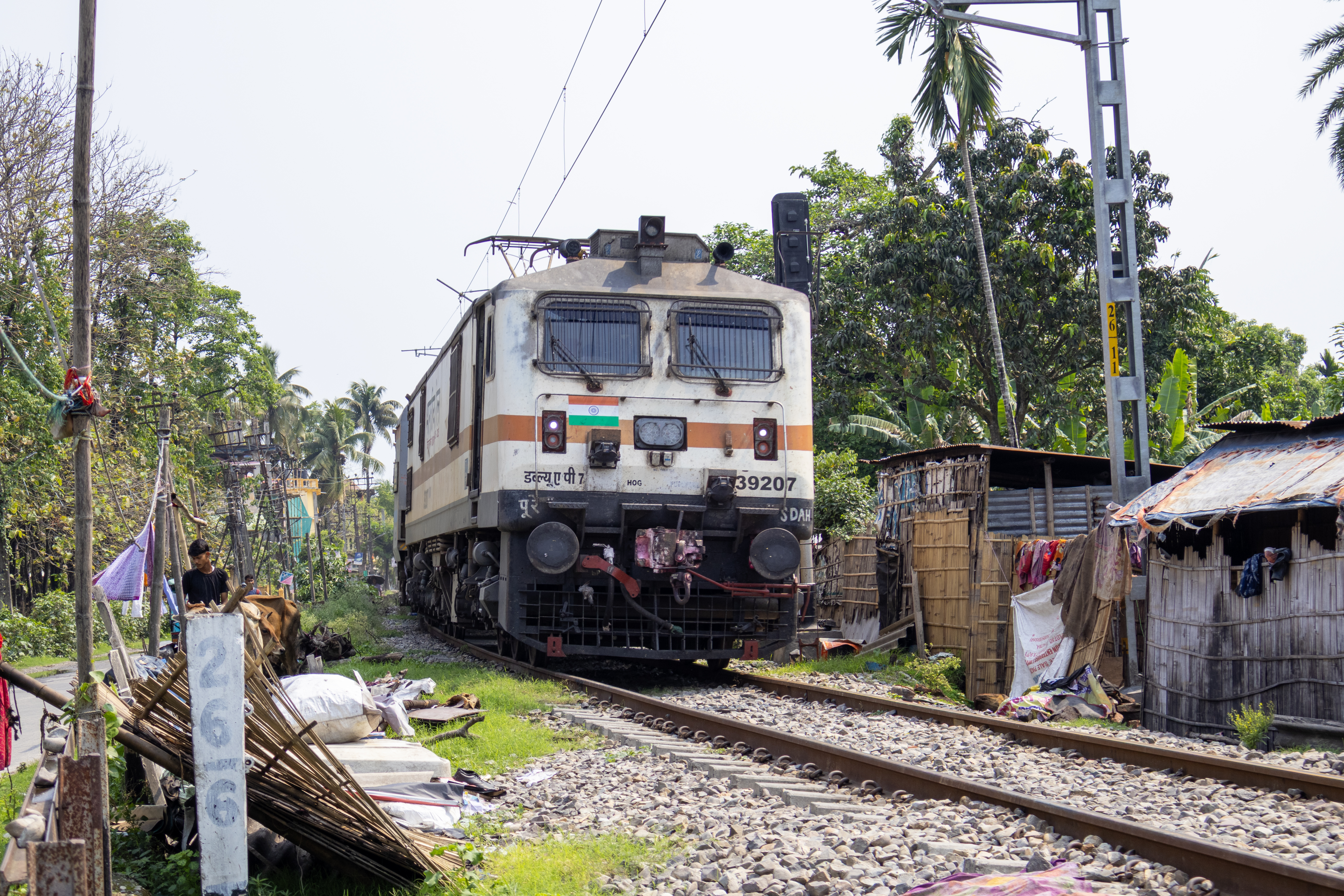
SDAH based WAP-7 39207 pulling 13147 Sealdah–Bamanhat Uttar Banga Express spotted near Cooch Behar Rail Ghoomty.

== Coaches ==
The 13147 / 48 Sealdah–Bamanhat Uttar Banga Express presently has 1 H1 AC 1 tier, 2 AC 2 tier, 3 AC 3 tier, 7 Sleeper class, 2 General Unreserved & 1 SLR (Seating cum Luggage Rake) coaches. It does not have a pantry car.

As is customary with most train services in India, coach composition may be amended at the discretion of Indian Railways depending on demand.

== Service ==
The 13147 Sealdah–Bamanhat Uttar Banga Express covers the distance of 693 kilometres in 13 hours 50 mins (50.10 km/h (31 mph)) & in 13 hours 45 mins as 13148 Bamanhat–Sealdah Uttar Banga Express (49.80 km/h (31 mph)).

Earlier it was known as North Bengal Express.

== Route & halts ==
The 13147 / 13148 Uttar Banga Express runs from

- Sealdah (Kolkata)
- Dakshineswar
- Barddhaman Junction
- Guskara
- Bolpur Shantiniketan
- Ahmadpur Junction (13147 only)
- Sainthia Junction
- Rampurhat Junction
- Nalhati
- Pakur
- New Farakka Junction
- Malda Town
- Samsi
- Kumedpur
- Barsoi
- Dalkhola
- Kishanganj
- Aluabari Road
- New Jalpaiguri (Siliguri)
- Jalpaiguri Road
- New Maynaguri
- Dhupguri
- Falakata
- New Cooch Behar
- Dewanhat
- Dinhata
- Bamanhat.

== Traction ==
earlier was WDG-3A. As the route is now fully electrified, it is hauled by a Sealdah based WAP 7 electric Locomotive,Howrah-based WAP-4 Electric Locomotive or Howrah-based WAP-5 from end to end.

== Timings ==
- 13147 Sealdah–Bamanhat Uttar Banga Express leaves Sealdah on a daily basis at 19:35 hrs IST and reaches Bamanhat at 11:30 hrs IST the next day.
- 13148 Bamanhat–Sealdah Uttar Banga Express leaves Bamanhat on a daily basis at 13:15 hrs IST and reaches Sealdah at 05:15 hrs IST the next day.

== Coach composition ==
The coach composition of train is;

- 1 AC II Tier
- 1 AC III Tier
- 10 Sleeper coaches
- 6 General Unreserved
- 2 Seating cum Luggage rake/parcel van

Loco	1	2	3	4	5	6	7	8	9	10	11	12	13	14	15	16	17
	SLR	GEN	GEN	S1	S2	S3	S4	S5	S6	S7	B1	B2	B3	A1	A2	H1	SLR

== Incidents ==
The Sainthia train collision occurred on 19 July 2010, at the Sainthia Junction railway station in Sainthia, India, when the Uttar Banga Express collided with the Vananchal Express as the latter was leaving the platform. 66 people died as a result of the accident, and 165 were reported injured.
