= Dewanhat =

- Village
- Location in West Bengal, India Dewanhat (India) Dewanhat (Asia)
- Coordinates: 26.2437°N 89.4863°E
- Country: India
- State: West Bengal
- District: Cooch Behar
- Elevation: 37 m (121 ft)

Population (2011)
  - Total: 7,460

Languages
  - Official: Bengali
  - Additional official: English
- Time zone: UTC+5:30 (IST)
- PIN: 736134
- Vehicle registration: WB
- Website: coochbehar.gov.in

Dewanhat is a village in the Cooch Behar I CD block in the Cooch Behar Sadar subdivision of the Cooch Behar district of West Bengal, India.

== Geography ==
Places in the Cooch Behar Sadar subdivision in Cooch Behar district
CT: census town, M: municipal town, R: rural/ urban centre, H: historical/ religious centre
Owing to space constraints in the small map, the actual locations in a larger map may vary slightly

=== Area overview ===
The map alongside shows the north-central part of the district. It has the highest level of urbanisation in an overwhelming rural district. 22.08% of the population of the Cooch Behar Sadar subdivision lives in the urban areas and 77.92% in the rural areas. The entire district forms the flat alluvial flood plains of mighty rivers.

Note: The map alongside presents some of the notable locations in the subdivision. All places marked in the map are linked in the larger full screen map.

== Demographics ==
As per the 2011 Census of India, Dewanhatmoamari had a population of 7,460. There were 3,847 (52%) males and 3,613 (48%) females. There were 684 persons in the age range of 0 to 6 years. The total number of literate people in Dewanhatmoamari was 6,054 (89.34% of the population over 6 years).

== Transport ==
There is a station named Dewanhat Railway Station on the broad gauge Alipurduar-Bamanhat branch line. The nearest airport, Cooch Behar Airport, is 13 km away.

== Education ==
Dewanhat Mahavidyalaya was established in 2007. Affiliated with the Cooch Behar Panchanan Barma University, it offers honours courses in Sanskrit, history, philosophy and political science and a general course in arts.

== Healthcare ==
Dewanhat Rural Hospital, with 30 beds at Dewanhat, is the major government medical facility in the Cooch Behar I CD block.
