= Bhurungamari Upazila =

Upazila in Kurigram district

Bhurungamari ভুরুঙ্গামারী
- Upazila
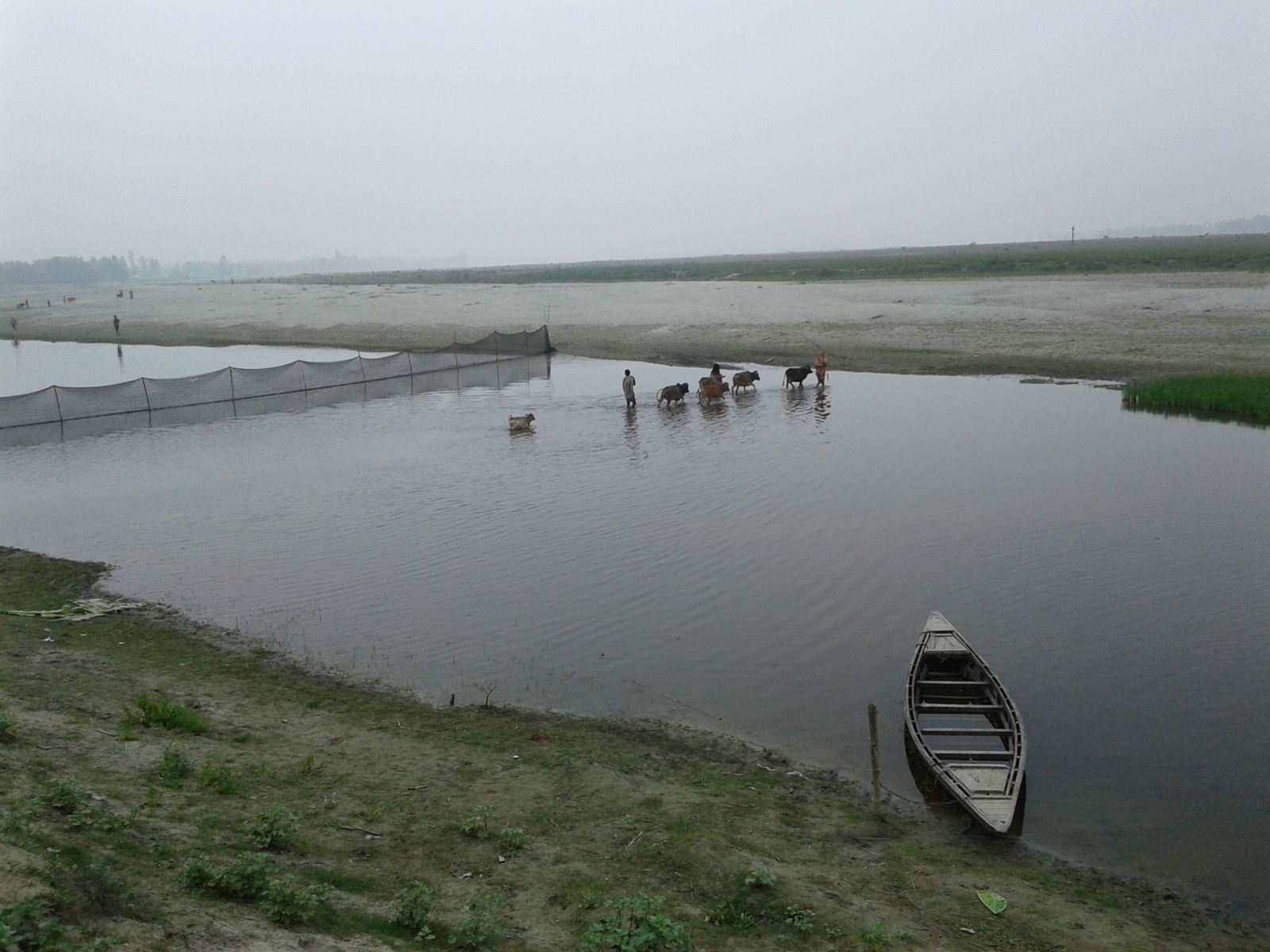
- Dudhkumar River at Bhurungamari upazila

- Coordinates: 26°7.5′N 89°41′E
- Country: Bangladesh
- Division: Rangpur
- District: Kurigram

Area
  - Total: 236.26 km^{2} (91.22 sq mi)

Population (2022)
  - Total: 255,548
  - Density: 1,081.6/km^{2} (2,801.4/sq mi)
- Time zone: UTC+6 (BST)
- Postal code: 5670
- Website: Official Map of Bhurungamari

Bhurungamari Upazila mauza geocode map

Bhurungamari (Bengali: ভুরুঙ্গামারী) is the northernmost upazila of Kurigram District in the Division of Rangpur, Bangladesh.

== Geography ==
Bhurungamari is located at 26.1250°N 89.6833°E. It has 57,005 households and total area 236.26 km^{2}.

== Demographics ==
Religions in Bhurungamari Upazila (2022)
Religion	Percent
Islam	98.38%
Hinduism	1.61%
Other or not stated	0.01%

According to the 2022 Bangladeshi census, Bhurungamari Upazila had 69,120 households and a population of 255,548. 9.39% of the population were under 5 years of age. Bhurungamari had a literacy rate (age 7 and over) of 63.06%: 66.33% for males and 59.96% for females, and a sex ratio of 95.97 males for every 100 females. 48,593 (19.02%) lived in urban areas.

According to the 2011 Census of Bangladesh, Bhurungamari Upazila had 57,005 households and a population of 231,538. 54,360 (23.48%) were under 10 years of age. Bhurungamari had a literacy rate (age 7 and over) of 39.57%, compared to the national average of 51.8%, and a sex ratio of 1040 females per 1000 males. 29,683 (12.82%) lived in urban areas.

As of the 1991 Census of Bangladesh, Bhurungamari has a population of 176,822. Males constitute are 50.38% of the population, and females 49.62%. This Upazila's eighteen up population is 88,435. Bhurungamari has an average literacy rate of 19.5% (7+ years), and the national average of 32.4% literate.

== Administration ==
Bhurungamari Upazila is divided into ten union parishads: Andharijhar, Bhurungamari, Boldia, Bangasonahat, Char Bhurungamari, Joymarirhat, Paiker Chhara, Pathardubi, Shilkhuri, and Tilai. The union parishads are subdivided into 70 mauzas and 126 villages.

== Transport ==
=== Railway links ===
Places in the south-eastern portion of Dinhata subdivision in Cooch Behar district, western part of Dhubri district, northern part of Kurigram and Lalmonirhat districts, all linked with development of railways in the area
CT: census town, R: rural/ urban centre, RS: railway station
Owing to space constraints in the small map, the actual locations in a larger map may vary slightly

During the British era, there was a railway line linking Assam with Bengal that passed through Bhurngamari. The rail link was closed after the partition of India in 1947. Possibilities of resumption of traffic through the Bhurugamari-Sonahat section was discussed when the resumption of rail traffic between India and Pakistan took place in 1955.

Note: The map alongside presents the position as it stands today (2020). The international border was not there when the railways were first laid in the area in the 19th-20th century. It came up in 1947. Since then, it has been an effort to live up to the new realities. The map is 'interactive' (the larger version) - it means that all the places shown in the map are linked in the full screen map.

=== Developments ===
An inland port has been set up at Sonahat.

In 2018, the existing road bridge across the Dudhkumar River was found to be weak and a new bridge was sanctioned, along with a new highway. The Kurigram (Daserhat)-Nageshwari-Bhurungamari-Sonahat Land port road is to be converted to a national highway.

== See also ==
- Upazilas of Bangladesh
- Districts of Bangladesh
- Divisions of Bangladesh
