= Dewanhat railway station =

Railway station in West Bengal

Dewanhat Railway Station

General information
- Location: Dewan Hatmoamari, Nababganj, Dist - Coochbehar 736134 State: West Bengal; India
- Coordinates: 26.2437°N 89.4863°E
- Elevation: 40.00 metres (131.23 ft)
- System: Indian Railways Station
- Owner: Indian Railways
- Operator: Northeast Frontier Railway zone
- Line: Alipurduar–Bamanhat branch line
- Platforms: 2
- Tracks: 2 (broad gauge)

Construction
- Structure type: At grade
- Parking: Available

Other information
- Status: Functioning
- Station code: DHH
- Zone(s): Northeast Frontier Railway zone
- Division(s): Alipurduar
Location
- Location within West Bengal Location within India

Dewanhat Railway Station serves the area of Dewanhat which lies on Cooch Behar district in the Indian state of West Bengal. The station is on Alipurduar–Bamanhat branch line under Alipurduar railway division of Northeast Frontier Railway zone. Local, DEMU trains along with some major trains like Sealdah-Bamanhat Uttar Banga Express, Siliguri Bamanhat Intercity Express are available from this station.
