= Dinhata railway station =

Railway station in West Bengal, India

Dinhata Railway Station

General information
- Location: Dinhata Railway Station Road, Bhangni Pratham Khanda, PS; Dinhata, Dist - Coochbehar, Pin; 736135 State: West Bengal; India
- Coordinates: 26.13°N 89.47°E
- Elevation: 39.00 metres (127.95 ft)
- System: Indian Railways Station
- Owner: Indian Railways
- Operator: Northeast Frontier Railway zone
- Line: Alipurduar–Bamanhat branch line
- Platforms: 2
- Tracks: 2 (broad gauge)

Construction
- Structure type: At grade
- Parking: Available

Other information
- Status: Functioning
- Station code: DHH
- Zone(s): Northeast Frontier Railway zone
- Division(s): Alipurduar
Location
- Location within West Bengal Location within India

Dinhata Railway Station serves the city of Dinhata lying in Alipurduar–Bamanhat branch line, Cooch Behar district of West Bengal. The station lies under Alipurduar railway division of Northeast Frontier Railway zone.

== Trains ==
=== Major Trains ===
- Sealdah-Bamanhat Uttar Banga Express
- Siliguri Bamanhat Intercity Express.
