= Sonahat =

Sonahat সোনাহাট
- Land port
- Location in Bangladesh
- Coordinates: 26.174722°N 88.784111°E
- Country: Bangladesh
- Division: Rangpur Division
- District: Kurigram District
- Time zone: UTC+6 (BST)

Sonahat is an inland port in the Bhurungamari Upazila in the Kurigram District of the Rangpur Division in Bangladesh.

== Railway links ==
Places in the south-eastern portion of Dinhata subdivision in Cooch Behar district, western part of Dhubri district, northern part of Kurigram district and northern part of Lalmonirhat district, all linked with development of railways in the area
CT: census town, R: rural/ urban centre, RS: railway station
Owing to space constraints in the small map, the actual locations in a larger map may vary slightly

During the British era, there was a railway line linking Assam with Bengal that passed through Sonahat. The place was familiar as the entry gate of Assam. The rail link was closed after the partition of India in 1947. Possibilities of resumption of traffic through the Bhurugamari-Sonahat section was discussed when the resumption of rail traffic between India and Pakistan took place in 1955. On 1965 a part of the bridge across the Dharla River at 26.00304°N 89.46934°E was washed away & then the 1965 Indo-Pak War stopped rail services between India & East Pakistan which transformed Bamanhat-Bhurungamari-Sonahat-Golokganj section a defunct railway route. Prior to the partition of India, the prestigious Assam Mail used to travel from Santahar to Guwahati.

== Developments ==
There is a bridge across the Dudhkumar River (official name: Sonahat bridge, local name: Pateshwary bridge). It was built in 1887 as a railway bridge, with a single lane. It was closed in 1947.

In 2018, the existing road bridge across the Dudhkumar River was found to be weak and a new bridge was sanctioned, along with a new highway. The Kurigram (Daserhat)-Nageshwari-Bhurungamari-Sonahat Land port road is to be converted to a national highway.

All kinds of export-import activities at Sonahat was stopped for 75 days from 25 March 2020 because of Coronavirus.

Note: The map alongside presents the position as it stands today (2020). The international border was not there when the railways were first laid in the area in the 19th-20th century. It came up in 1947. Since then, it has been an effort to live up to the new realities. The map is 'interactive' (the larger version) - it means that all the places shown in the map are linked in the full screen map.

== Education ==
Sonahat Degree College is located near Sonahat Landport.
