= Amingaon =

- Neighbourhood
- Interactive map of Amingaon
- Coordinates: 26°11′18″N 91°40′42″E
- Country: India
- State: Assam
- District: Kamrup district
- City: North Guwahati
- Elevation: 31 m (102 ft)
- Time zone: UTC+5:30 (IST)
- PIN: 781 XXX
- Vehicle registration: AS-01
- Lok Sabha constituency: Gauhati
- Vidhan Sabha constituency: Jalukbari

Amingaon (Assamese pronunciation: [ˈɑ:mɪnˌgɑ̃ʊ]) is a locality in North Guwahati, Assam and served as the district headquarters of Kamrup district.

== Geography ==
Amingaon is located at 26°11′0″N 91°40′0″E with a mean elevation of 31 m (102 ft) above sea level.

To its north and west is the Agyathuri hill, to its south is the Brahmaputra River, and to its east is IIT Guwahati. A large area of Amingaon is occupied by factories and warehouses; the largest aggregation is the Export Promotion Industrial Park (EPIP), which is located near the riverbank.

== Location ==
National Highway 27 passes through Amingaon. The nearest airport is Guwahati Airport. Amingaon houses the Agthori railway station, although it is not a major stoppage, as well as the historical Amin Gaon railway station.

It is connected to Guwahati via the Saraighat Bridge.

== Cricket ground ==
Amingaon Cricket Ground (26.1915°N 91.6739°E) is a ground that has hosted a number of BCCI conducted matches.
