= Amingaon railway station =

Railway station in Assam

Coordinates: 26.1878°N 91.6837°E

Amin Gaon

General information
- Location: Barpeta-Hajo-Guwahati Road, Amingaon, Guwahati, Assam; India
- Elevation: 54 metres (177 ft)
- System: Indian Railways station
- Owner: Indian Railways
- Platforms: 2
- Tracks: 4
- Connections: Auto stand

Construction
- Structure type: Standard (on-ground station)
- Parking: No
- Cycle facilities: No

Other information
- Status: Single diesel line
- Station code: AMJ
- Zone(s): Northeast Frontier Railway zone
- Division(s): Lumding
Location
- Location within Guwahati Location within Assam

Amin Gaon Railway Station is a defunct railway station alongside the Brahmaputra River in Amingaon, north of Guwahati in the Indian state of Assam. The station was opened in 1908 and had a single platform.

The North East Frontier Railway announced in 2022 that it planned to restore the station as part of a heritage project.
