= New Gitaldaha railway station =

Indian Railways station

New Gitaldaha

General information
- Location: Cooch Behar, West Bengal; India
- Coordinates: 26.03524°N 89.48884°E
- System: Indian Railways station

Other information
- Status: Line out of service

History
- Opened: 1900
- Closed: 1955–1960?
- Former names: Cooch Behar State Railway
Location
- Location within West Bengal Location within India

New Gitaldaha railway station is on the broad-gauge Alipurduar–Bamanhat branch line under Alipurduar railway division of West Bengal.

Gitaldaha was a railway station and is a defunct rail transit point on the India–Bangladesh border in Cooch Behar district in the Indian state of West Bengal. The corresponding point on the Bangladesh side is Mogalhat in Lalmonirhat District.

== Railway links ==
Places in the south-eastern portion of Dinhata subdivision in Cooch Behar district, western part of Dhubri district, northern part of Kurigram district and northern part of Lalmonirhat district, all linked with development of railways in the area.
CT: census town, R: rural/ urban centre, RS: railway station.
Owing to space constraints in the small map, the actual locations in a larger map may vary slightly.

The area was agog with railway activity in the 19th–20th century. The Assam Behar State Railway linked Parbatipur to Katihar, with a metre-gauge line in 1889. In the early 1900s, the Eastern Bengal Railway extended railways to Lalmonirhat, Gitaldaha (via Mogalhat), Bamanhat, Golokganj and other places, thereby connecting Assam to Katihar, in Bihar, via North Bengal. In 1901 Cooch Behar State Railway built the narrow-gauge line from Gitaldaha to Jayanti, near the Bhutan border. Shortly thereafter, the line was upgraded to meter gauge.

The Lalmonirhat–Mogalhat–Gitaldaha route was functional when India and Pakistan agreed in 1955 for resumption of railway traffic between the two countries, and it included movement of cross traffic via Mogalhat through the Eastern Bengal Railway. A portion of the bridge across the Dharla River at 26.00304°N 89.46934°E was washed away by floods in 1988.

Prior to the partition of India, the prestigious Assam Mail used to travel from Santahar to Guwahati.

The conversion of the 72 km-long Alipurduar–Bamanhat branch line to 5 ft 6 in (1,676 mm) broad gauge in 2007, and its subsequent recommissioning, had a station at New Gitaldaha.

New Gitaldaha railway station serves Gitaldaha and the surrounding areas.

The map alongside presents the position as it stands today (2020). The international border was not there when the railways were first laid in the area in the 19th-20th century. It came up in 1947. The map is 'interactive' (the larger version) - it means that all the places shown in the map are linked in the full screen map.
