= Cooch Behar State Railway =

Railway in West Bengal, India

- Industry: Railways
- Founded: 1894
- Headquarters: Cooch Behar, India
- Area served: Koch Bihar
- Services: Rail transport

Cooch Behar State Railway (CBSR) was a 2 ft 6 in (762 mm) narrow-gauge railway from Jayanti to Lalmonirhat in the Indian state of West Bengal.

== History ==
Nripendra Narayan, the Maharaja of Cooch Behar, established Cooch Behar State Railway in 1893–98. After some deliberations and discussions with the British authorities about their plans, it was decided in 1891–92 to build a 2 ft 6 in (762 mm)-wide narrow gauge railway from the southern bank of the Torsa opposite Cooch Behar town to Gitaldaha, a station on the tracks of Eastern Bengal Railway connecting Dhubri with Lalmonirhat, now in Bangladesh. The line was constructed with the following stations: Torsa, Dewanhat, Chawrahat, Gitaldaha and Gitaldaha Ghat. It was opened for goods traffic from 15 September 1893 and for passenger traffic from 1 March 1894. Cooch Behar town was connected after a bridge was built on the Torsa and the line was extended to Alipurduar, Buxa and Jayanti near the India–Bhutan border. The complete line measuring 53.5 miles was opened in 1901. It was converted to 1,000 mm (3 ft 3 3/8 in)-wide metre gauge in 1910. The railway system was operated by Eastern Bengal Railway. In 1932, only two trains ran on the route – one in the morning and the other in the evening. In the early 1950s, the system was amalgamated with Indian Railways as a part of North Eastern Railway (now Northeast Frontier Railway).

== Conversion to broad gauge ==
The line was converted to 5 ft 6 in (1,676 mm) broad gauge in 2007.
