= Kaunia–Dharlla State Railway =

Railway line in Bangladesh

Coordinates: 25.7992°N 89.5481°E

The Kaunia–Dharlla State Railway was a 2 ft 6 in (762 mm) narrow gauge railway in a part of British India now in Bangladesh. It was constructed in 1881, and was converted to 1,000 mm (3 ft 3 3/8 in) metre gauge in 1901. As a 2 ft 6 in (762 mm) gauge railway it operated small 0-4-2T and 2-4-0T locomotives
