= Lalmonirhat Junction railway station =

Railway station in Lalmonirhat, Bangladesh

Lalmonirhat Junction লালমনিরহাট জংশন

General information
- Location: Station Road, Lalmonirhat, Lalmonirhat District, Rangpur Division; Bangladesh
- Coordinates: 25.91193°N 89.44548°E
- Owner: Bangladesh Railway
- Operator: Bangladesh Railway
- Lines: Burimari–Lalmonirhat–Parbatipur line Lalmonirhat-Gitaldaha Line
- Platforms: 4
- Tracks: 10
- Train operators: Bangladesh Railway

Construction
- Structure type: Standard (on ground station)
- Parking: Yes
- Accessible: Yes
- Architectural style: Modern

Other information
- Status: Functioning
- Station code: LHM
- Zone(s): West Zone
- Division(s): Lalmonirhat

History
- Opened: 1900; 126 years ago

Services
Preceding station	Bangladesh Railway	Following station
Mahendranagar	Line; Burimari–Lalmonirhat–Parbatipur line	Aditamari
Terminus	Line; Lalmonirhat-Gitadaha Line	Mogalhat
Location

Lalmonirhat Junction railway station (Bengali: লালমনিরহাট জংশন রেলওয়ে স্টেশন) is a railway junction in Lalmonirhat District of Rangpur Division in Bangladesh.

== History ==
Places in the south-eastern portion of Dinhata subdivision in Cooch Behar district, western part of Dhubri district, northern part of Kurigram district and northern part of Lalmonirhat district, all linked with development of railways in the area
CT: census town, R: rural/ urban centre, RS: railway station
Owing to space constraints in the small map, the actual locations in a larger map may vary slightly

North Bengal State Railway opened a metre gauge line from Parbatipur to Kaunia in 1879. Two narrow gauge lines were laid by Eastern Bengal Railway from Kaunia to Dharla River, thereby creating the Kaunia–Dharlla State Railway. The Kaunia Dharla railway lines were converted to metre gauge in 1901. The Kaunia-Dharla line was extended to Amingaon in 1908.

By the turn of the century, Lalmonirhat had emerged as an important railway centre. Bengal Dooars Railway constructed a line to Malbazar. Links were established with Assam, with the Golokganj-Amingaon line coming up.

Prior to the partition of India, the prestigious Assam Mail used to travel from Santahar to Guwahati via Lalmonirhat.

Note: The map alongside presents the position as it stands today (2020). The international border was not there when the railways were first laid in the area in the 19th–20th century. It came up in 1947. Since then, it has been an effort to live up to the new realities. The map is 'Interactive' (the larger version) – it means that all the places shown in the map are linked in the full screen map.

== Trains ==
Lalmoni Express and Karotoa Express Intercity trains runn from this station. Among Lalmoni Express most important because it connects to Capital Dhaka. Karoto Express runs between Santahare Junction (via Bogura-Gaibandha) to Burimari the land port. Also, some commuter, local mail and Shuttle trains run services between Rangpur, Dinajpur, Kurigram, Perbottipur Junction, Bogura, Gaibandha, Santahare Junction, etc.
