= Mogalhat railway station =

Railway station in Bangladesh

Mogalhat মোগলহাট
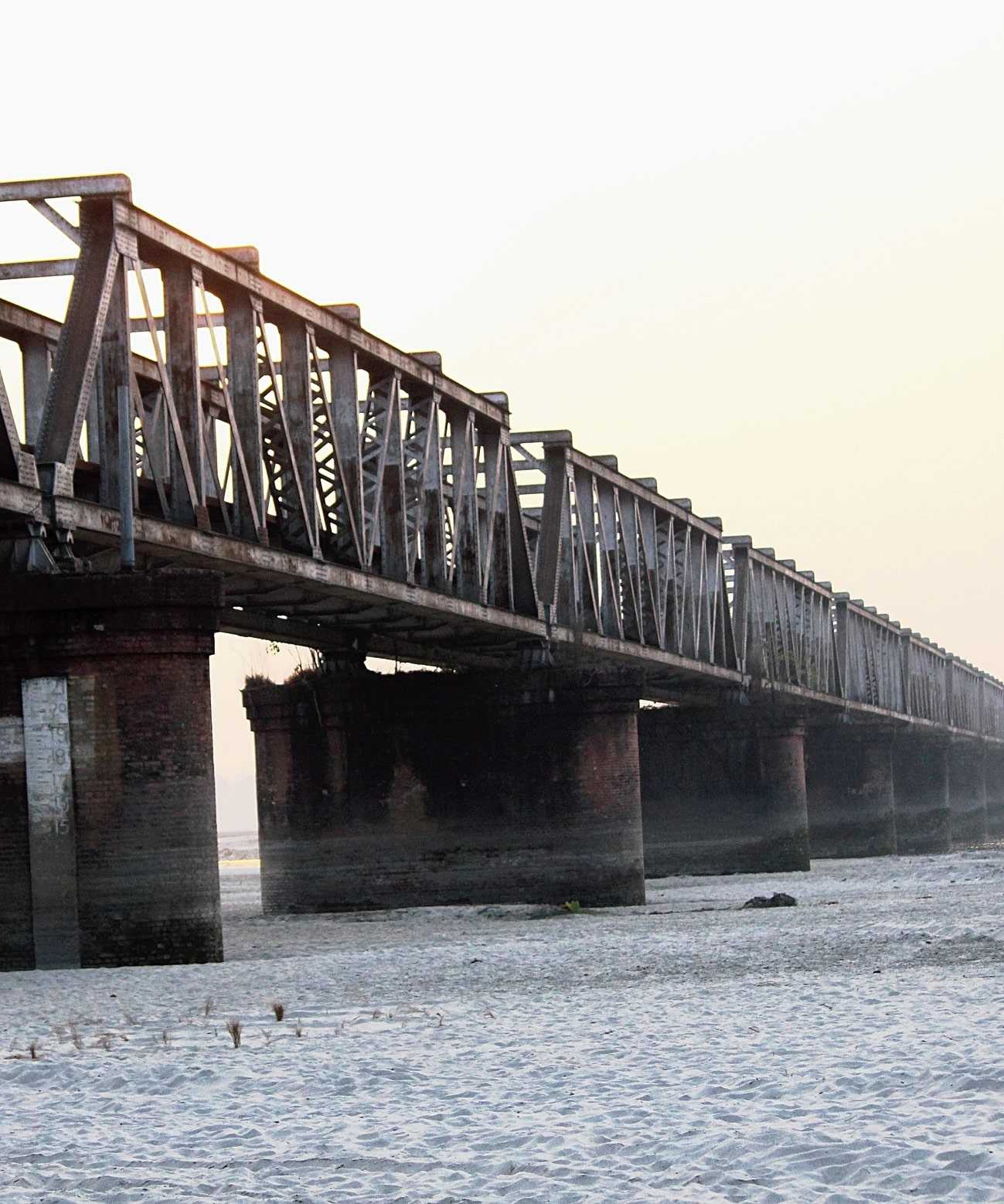
- Remains of Old Railway Bridge

General information
- Location: Lalmonirhat, Rangpur; Bangladesh
- Coordinates: 25.99224°N 89.45184°E

Other information
- Status: Line out of service

History
- Opened: 1896
- Closed: 1965
- Former names: Northern Bengal State Railway
Location

Mogalhat (Bengali: মোগলহাট) is a border railway station in Bangladesh, situated in Lalmonirhat District, in Rangpur Division. It is a defunct railway transit point on the Bangladesh-India border.

== History ==
By the turn of the nineteenth century Lalmonirhat railway station had emerged as an important railway centre. Bengal Dooars Railway constructed a line to Malbazar. Cooch Behar State Railway constructed the Geetaldaha-Jayanti narrow gauge line. Links were established with Assam, with the Golokganj-Amingaon line coming up. In pre-independence days, a metre gauge line running via Radhikapur, Biral, Parbatipur, Tista, Gitaldaha and Golokganj connected Fakiragram in Assam with Katihar in Bihar.

The Mogalhat-Geetaldaha link was there in 1955, when Pakistan and India signed an agreement regarding resumption of rail traffic. On 1965 a part of the bridge across the Dharla River at 26.00304°N 89.46934°E was washed away & then the 1965 Indo-Pak War stopped rail services between India & East Pakistan which transformed Mogalhat-Gitaldaha section, a defunct railway transit point.

Note: The map below presents the position as it stands today (2020). The international border was not there when the railways were first laid in the area in the 19th-20th century. It came up in 1947. Since then, it has been an effort to live up to the new realities. The map is 'Interactive' (the larger version) - it means that all the places shown in the map are linked in the full screen map.

Places in the south-eastern portion of Dinhata subdivision in Cooch Behar district, western part of Dhubri district, northern part of Kurigram district and northern part of Lalmonirhat district, all linked with development of railways in the area
CT: census town, R: rural/ urban centre, RS: railway station
Owing to space constraints in the small map, the actual locations in a larger map may vary slightly
