= Jayanti, Alipurduar =

Jayanti Jainti
- Hills-cum-Village
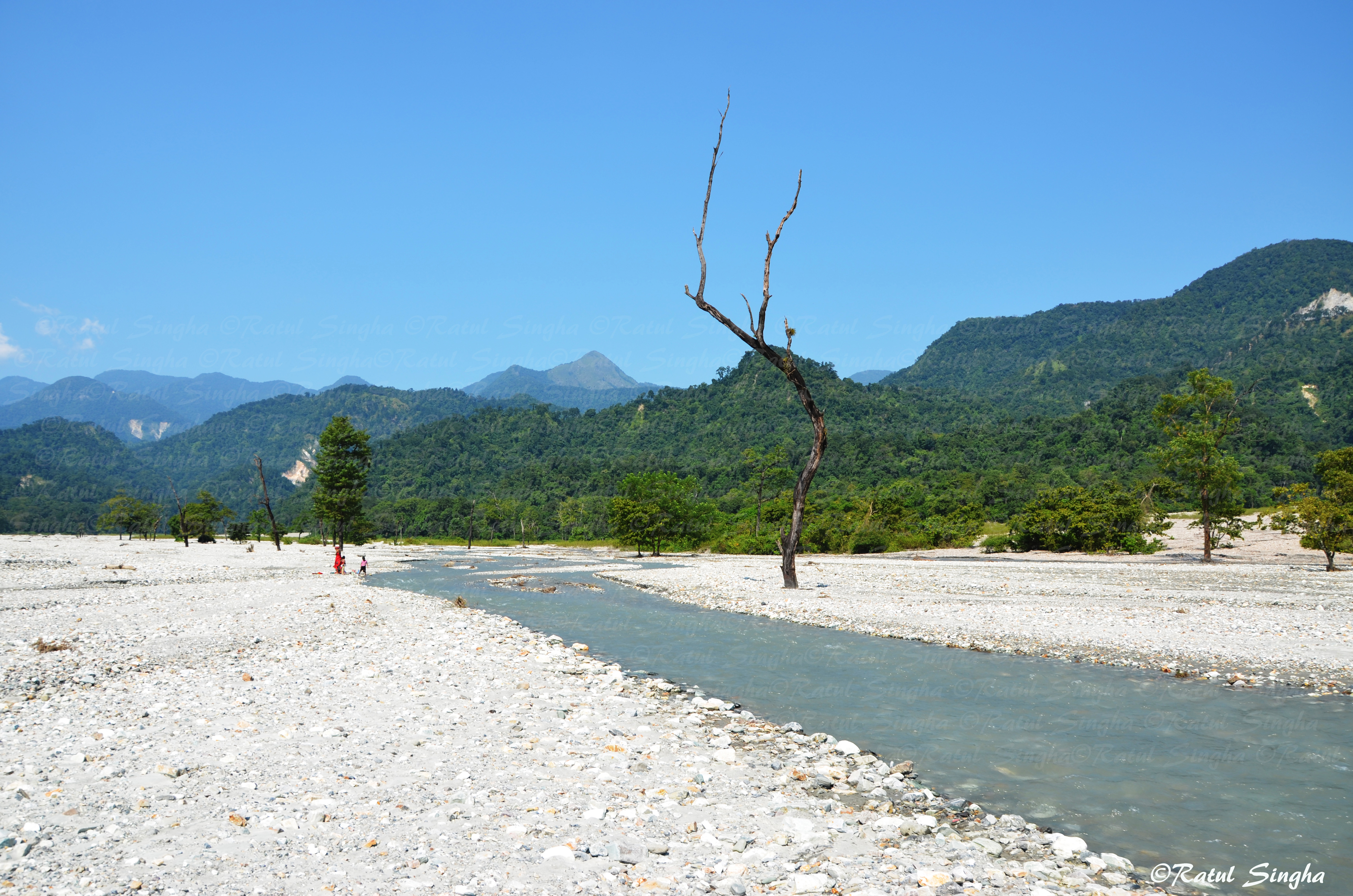
- Jayanti riverbed

- Location in West Bengal, India Jayanti (India)
- Coordinates: 26.7072°N 89.6113°E
- Country: India
- State: West Bengal
- District: Alipurduar

Government
  - Type: Panchayati raj (India)
  - Body: Gram panchayat
- Time zone: UTC+5:30 (IST)
- ISO 3166 code: IN-WB
- Vehicle registration: WB
- Nearest city: Alipurduar
- Lok Sabha constituency: Alipurduar
- Website: alipurduar.gov.in

Jayanti is a village in the Kalchini CD block in the Alipurduar subdivision of the Alipurduar district in West Bengal, India. It is a tourist destination of Dooars. Jayanti borders India and Bhutan.

== Geography ==
Places and tea estates in the eastern portion of Alipurdar subdivision (including Kalchini, Kumargram and Alipuduar II CD blocks) in Alipurduar district
CT: census town, R: rural/ urban centre, N: neighbourhood, A: Air Force Station, NP: national park/ wildlife sanctuary, TE: tea estate, H: historical site
Abbreviations used in names – TG for Tea Garden (town/village), TE for Tea Estate
Owing to space constraints in the small map, the actual locations in a larger map may vary slightly

=== Location ===
Jayanti is located at 26.7072°N 89.6113°E.

Jayanti is a small forest village within Buxa Tiger Reserve. It is located along the Jayanti River, forming a natural border with the Bhutan hills. It is popular with hikers for its views of the surrounding landscape and wild fountains. A 13 km trek from Buxaduar to Jayanti passes through the dense forest of the Buxa Tiger Reserve.

Jayanti also features a stalactite cave known as Mahakal cave.

=== Area overview ===
Alipurduar district is covered by two maps. It is an extensive area in the eastern end of the Dooars in West Bengal. It is undulating country, largely forested, with numerous rivers flowing down from the outer ranges of the Himalayas in Bhutan. It is a predominantly rural area with 79.38% of the population living in the rural areas. The district has 1 municipal town and 20 census towns; 20.62% of the population lives in the urban areas. The scheduled castes and scheduled tribes, taken together, form more than half the population in all the six community development blocks in the district. There is high concentration of tribal people (scheduled tribes) in the three northern blocks of the district.

Note: The map alongside presents some of the notable locations in the subdivision. All places marked in the map are linked in the larger full screen map.

== Transport ==
The nearest railway station is Rajabhatkhawa Railway Station on the New Jalpaiguri-Alipurduar-Samuktala Road Line. The nearest airport is Bagdogra Airport in Siliguri.

== Gallery ==
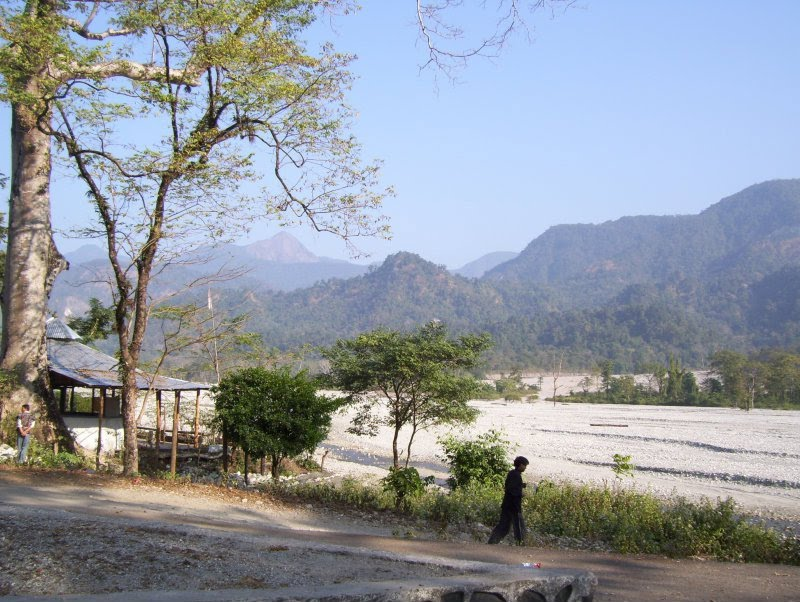
Jayanti Hills

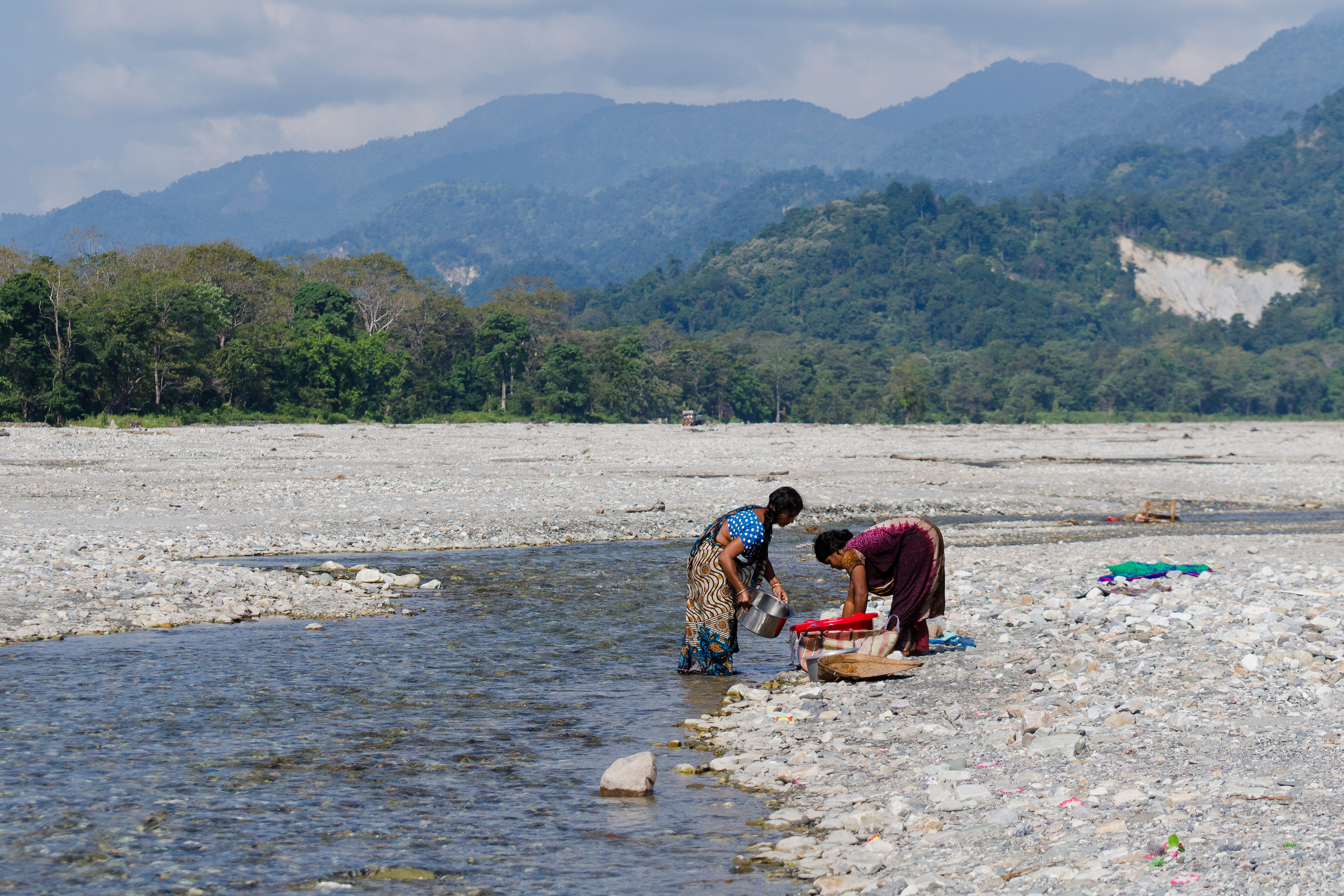
At the river bed for their daily needs

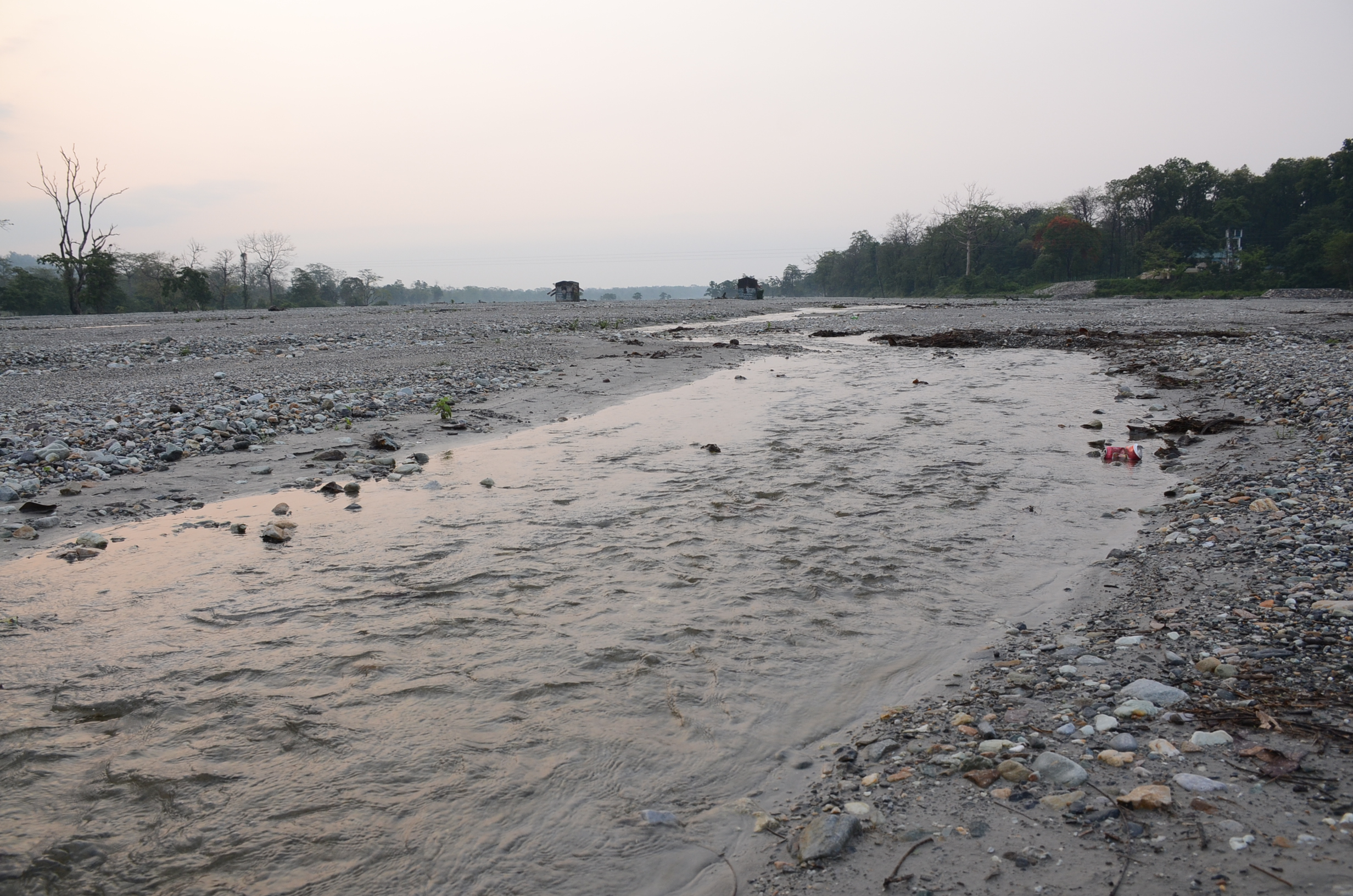
The Jayanti river

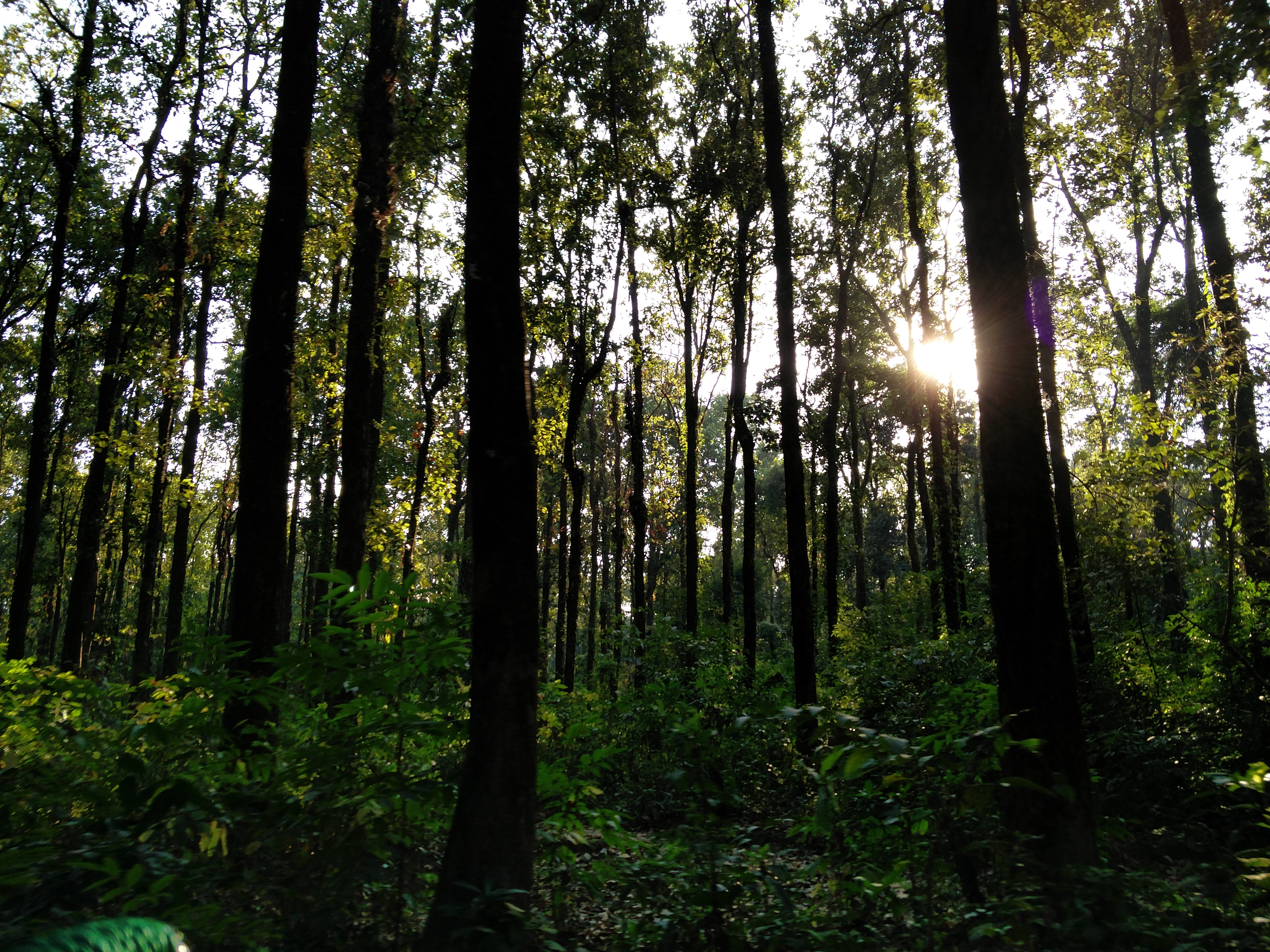
Jayanti forest in Buxa
