= Saraighat Express =

Train in India

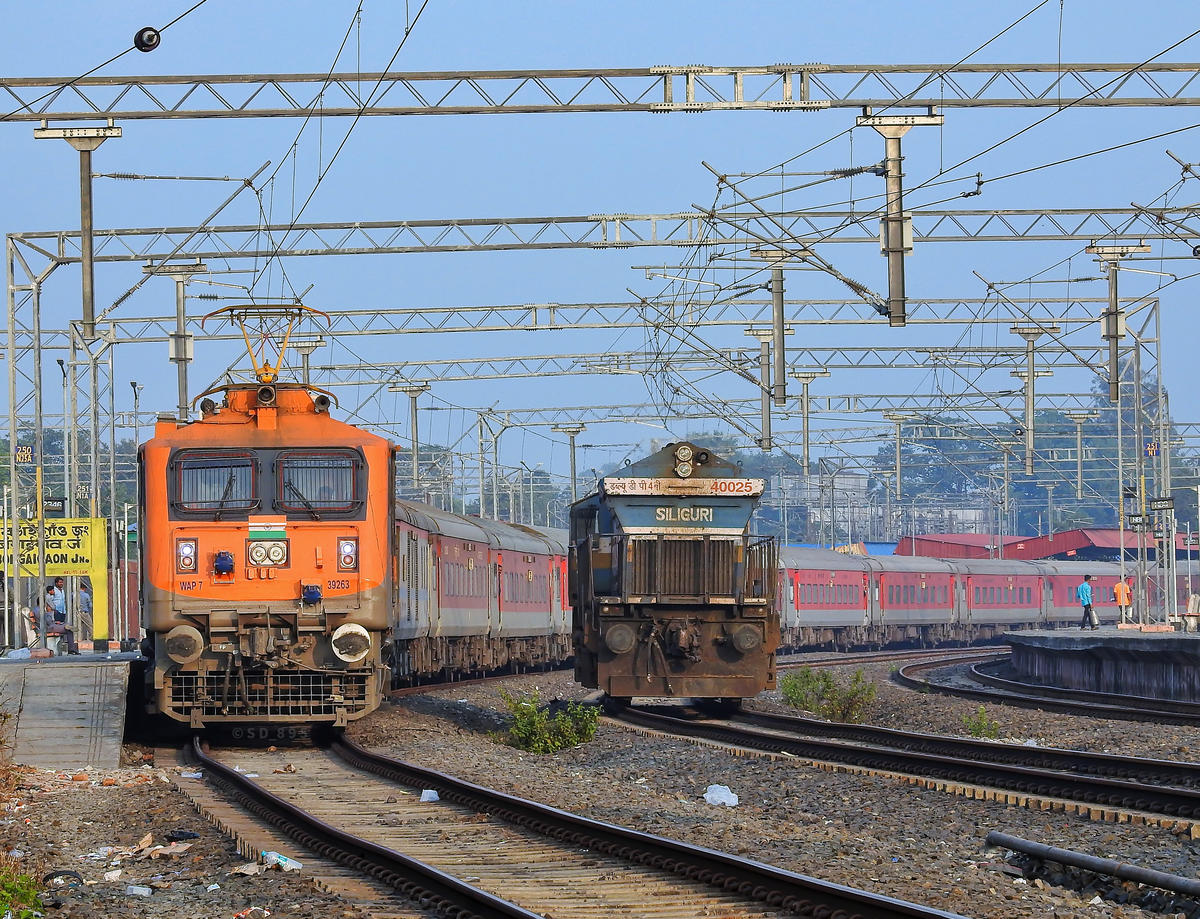
- Howrah bound 12346 Saraighat Superfast Express with HWH WAP-7 in Amrit Bharat Express livery standing beside a SGUJ WDP-4 with Dibrugarh Rajdhani Express at New Bongaigaon Junction.

Overview
- Service type: Superfast Express
- Locale: West Bengal, Jharkhand, Bihar, West Bengal & Assam
- First service: 6 July 1995; 31 years ago
- Current operator: Eastern Railway

Route
- Termini: Howrah (HWH) 16.05(D)/05.30(A); Guwahati (GHY) 09.50(A)/12.15(D)
- Stops: 16
- Distance travelled: 1,002 km (623 mi)
- Average journey time: 16 hours 40 mins
- Service frequency: Daily
- Train number: 12345 / 12346

On-board services
- Classes: AC First, AC 2 tier, AC 3 tier, AC 3 tier economy, Sleeper class, General Unreserved
- Seating arrangements: Yes
- Sleeping arrangements: Yes
- Catering facilities: Pantry car, On-board catering, E-catering
- Baggage facilities: Available

Technical
- Rolling stock: LHB coach
- Track gauge: 1,676 mm (5 ft 6 in)
- Operating speed: 60 km/h (37 mph) average including halts

The 12345 / 12346 Saraighat Superfast Express is a daily Superfast Express train which runs between Howrah Junction (West Bengal) and Guwahati (Assam), via Barddhaman, Rampurhat, Malda Town, New Jalpaiguri Junction. Saraighat SF Express is one of the fastest trains that connects Kolkata to the North East, and gets high priority end to end. The train is named after Battle of Saraighat between Ahom & Mughal & after the Saraighat Bridge.

== History ==
The service was started in 6 July 1995; 31 years ago as 3045/3046 Saraighat Express with stops at Barddhaman, Bolpur(Shantiniketan), Sainthia, Rampurhat, Pakur, New Farakka Junction, Malda Town, Kishanganj, New Jalpaiguri Junction,New Cooch Behar, New Alipurduar, New Bongaigaon Junction & Rangiya Junction until 1998. From 2001, it was permanently diverted to run via Naranarayan Setu using New Bongaigaon Junction - Goalpara Town - Kamakhya Junction(now Shri Mata Kamakhya Dham Junction) line. Saraighat Express doesn't run via Saraighat Bridge, on which is it named. It was covering 975.4 km (606 mi) in 18 hrs running at 54.16 km/h (34 mph) speed. In 2001 after permanent diversion via Naranarayan Setu using New Bongaigaon Junction - Goalpara Town - Kamakhya Junction(now Shri Mata Kamakhya Dham Junction) line, number was changed to 2345/2346. Timings were preponed by 5 hrs 30 mins making it 15.40 pm to 09.40 am train in both ways, covering 1,000.3 km (622 mi) in 18 hrs running at 55.57 km/h (35 mph) speed. Before electrification in 2001-2011 period, the WDM-3 diesel locomotive from Howrah shed used to haul the train till Malda Town & then WDM-3 diesel locomotive from Malda Town shed used to haul the train till Guwahati. From 2011-2018, the train was hauled fully end to end by WDP-4 diesel locomotive of Siliguri Junction railway station shed. Full electrification reached Guwahati on 2018 & from then on WAP-7 electric locomotive from Howrah shed & recently WAP-7 electric locomotive from Siliguri Junction railway station shed hauls this train end to end. It is the 2nd train to get Electric Locomotive end to end from Guwahati after the North East Express.

== Coach composition ==
This train has 22 LHB coaches.

Howrah to Guwahati

Loco	1	2	3	4	5	6	7	8	9	10	11	12	13	14	15	16	17	18	19	20	21	22
	SLR	GEN	GEN	GEN	S1	S2	S3	S4	S5	S6	S7	S8	PC	HA1	A1	M1	B1	B2	B3	B4	B5	EOG

Guwahati to Howrah

Loco	1	2	3	4	5	6	7	8	9	10	11	12	13	14	15	16	17	18	19	20	21	22
	EOG	B5	B4	B3	B2	B1	M1	A1	HA1	PC	S8	S7	S6	S5	S4	S3	S2	S1	GEN	GEN	GEN	SLR

Please note that one of the rakes of this train has the exact opposite coach composition of what is mentioned.

== Halts ==
Barddhaman, Bolpur(Shantiniketan), Sainthia, Rampurhat Junction, New Farakka, Malda Town, Kishanganj, New Jalpaiguri Junction, Dhupguri, Falakata, New Cooch Behar, New Alipurduar, Kokrajhar, New Bongaigaon Junction, Goalpara Town & Kamakhya Junction

== Traction ==
earlier was WDP-4D. The train is hauled by a WAP-7 locomotive from Howrah Junction shed & recently is also hauled by WAP-7 locomotive from Siliguri Junction railway station shed
