= Naren Chandra Das =

Indian Army soldier (c. 1937 1938 – 2021)

Havildar Naren Chandra Das
- Born: 1937 or 1938; Lokra, Assam Province, British India
- Died: 27 December 2021 (aged 83); Lokra, Assam, India
- Military career
- Allegiance: India
- Branch: Indian Army
- Service years: 1957–1982
- Rank: Havildar
- Units: 9th Platoon, 5 Assam Rifles

Naren Chandra Das (1938 – 27 December 2021) was an Indian soldier. He was a havildar with the Assam Rifles, the oldest paramilitary arm of the Indian Army. He was part of the team that received the 14th Dalai Lama at the Indian border after he fled from Tibet in 1959, and was its last surviving member.

== Biography ==
Das was born in Lokra, near Tezpur. He grew up in nearby Balipara in what is now the Sonitpur district of the Indian state of Assam. He was a havildar with the Assam Rifles, the oldest paramilitary arm of the Indian Army. He joined the unit in 1957, completed his training and was made a rifleman in 1959 at the age of 22.

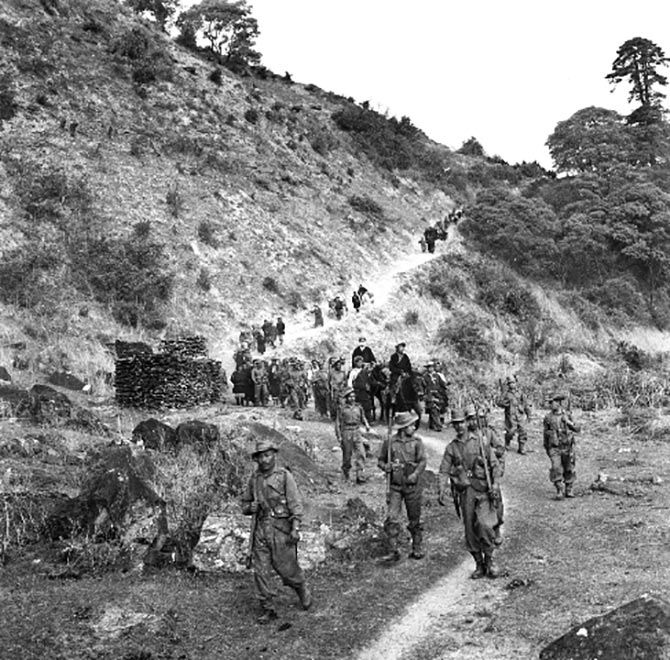
Once past the India-Tibet border, the Dalai Lama was escorted by the Assam Rifles

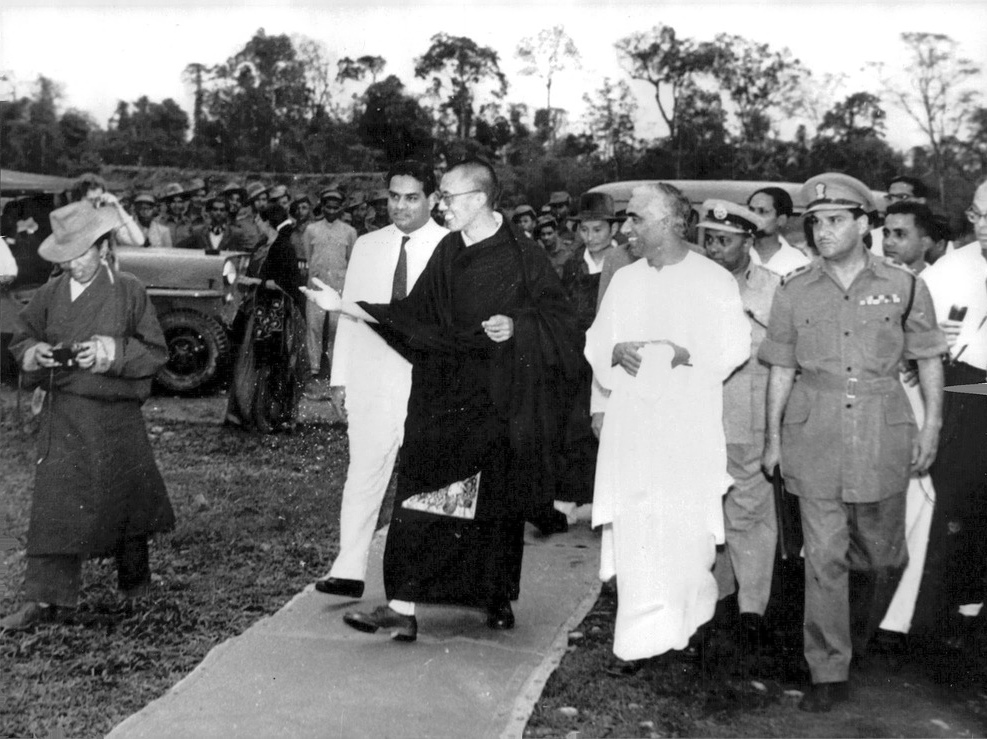
The 14th Dalai Lama with PN Menon on April 18th 1959

In March 1959, Das, along with five of his colleagues and a sectional commander, were directed to get to the international border to escort Tenzin Gyatso, the 14th Dalai Lama in order to welcome him in India. The monk, then 24, at the onset of the 1959 Tibetan uprising had fled Tibet and undertaken a 13-day trek disguised as a soldier to escape Chinese armed forces. Das and his unit started from Lumla where he was posted as a rifleman with the ninth platoon of the Assam Rifles to move towards Shakti, a point along the India-Tibet border. He would later recount that the unit was woken at 3 am and asked to pack their lunch and go to Shakti. The unit reached Shakti with .303 British Enfield rifles to escort the Dalai Lama and 20 of his guards on yaks and horseback. Guards from the ninth platoon of the Assam Rifles had earlier brought the Dalai Lama from Zuthangbo to Shakti. The Dalai Lama was granted a reception in Lumla before being escorted further to Tawang in Arunachal Pradesh. He received a guard of honour from the Assam Rifles in Tawang before going to Bomdila.

Das met the Dalai Lama again in 2017, during the Namami Brahmaputra festival, after almost six decades. He was later invited to McLeod Ganj near Dharamshala, the site of the Tibetan government-in-exile, as a guest of the monk.

Das lived in Lokra, Assam during his retirement. He died there on 27 December 2021, at the age of 83. He was married and had six children. At the time of his death, he was the last surviving member of the group of soldiers that had escorted the Dalai Lama. According to a statement from Assam Rifles, "Late Havildar Naren Chandra Das was the lone surviving warrior of the Assam Rifles among a band of seven Bravehearts who had successfully escorted and accompanied His Holiness Dalai Lama to Indian Soil in 1959. His valiant deeds and indomitable warrior spirit continues to inspire the scores of young sentinels of the northeast." The speaker of the Tibetan Parliament in Exile, Khenpo Sonam Tenphel, said in a condolence message that Das would "always be remembered for his outstanding selfless service to the nation and the people of India. We Tibetans will always hold him close to our hearts."

== See also ==
- Dalai Lama
- 1959 Tibetan uprising
