= Brahmaputra River =

River in China, India and Bangladesh

Brahmaputra Yarlung Tsangpo, Siang, Dihang
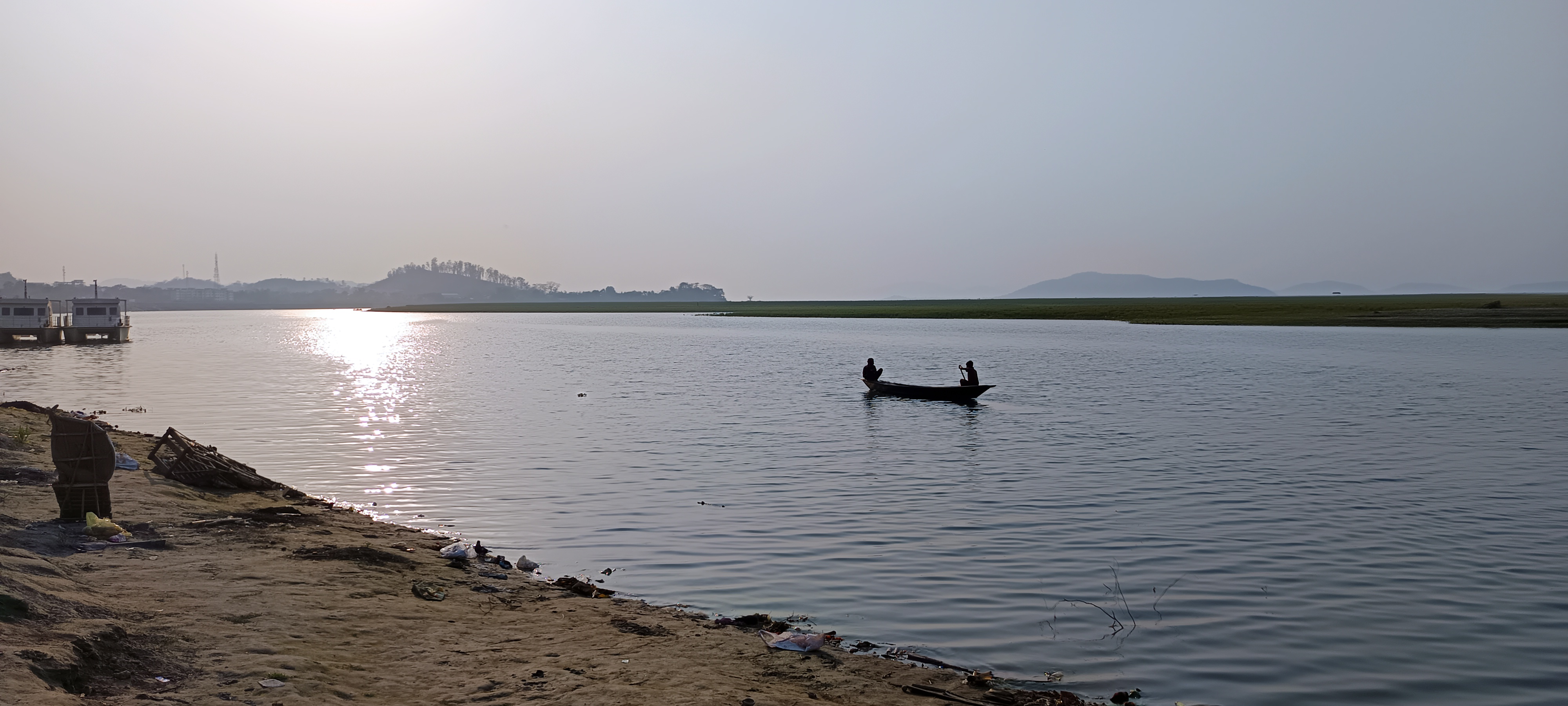
- Brahmaputra River in Guwahati, Assam, India

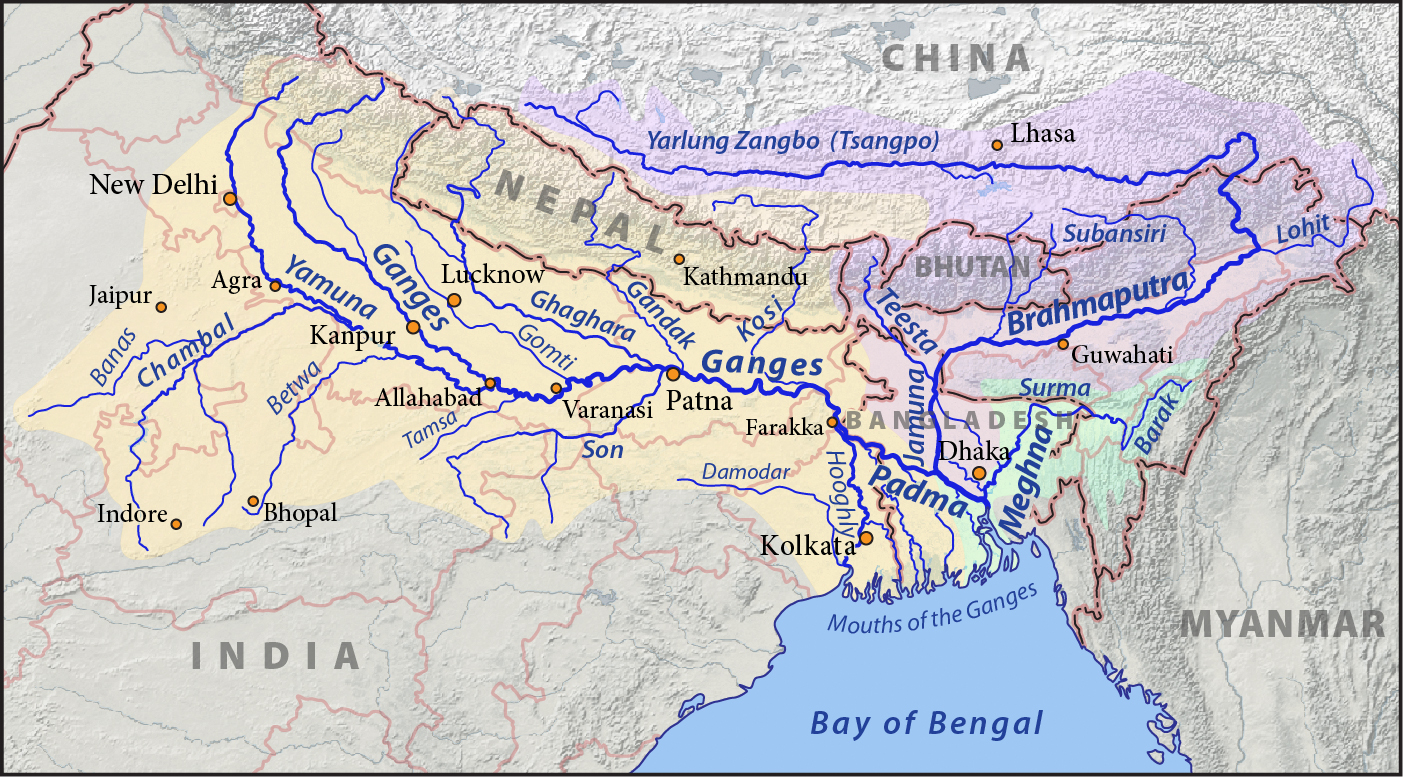
- Map of the combined drainage basins of the Brahmaputra (violet), Ganges (orange), and Meghna (green).
- Etymology: From Sanskrit ब्रह्मपुत्र (brahmaputra, "son of Brahma"), from ब्रह्मा (brahmā, "Brahma") + पुत्र (putra, "son").

Location
- Countries: China; India; Bangladesh
- Autonomous Region: Tibet
- Cities: Dhemaji; Dibrugarh; Jorhat; Tezpur; Guwahati; Dhubri; Sirajganj; Mymensingh; Tangail

Physical characteristics
- Source: Chemayungdung glacier, Manasarovar
  - location: Himalayas
  - coordinates: 30°19′N 82°08′E
  - elevation: 5,210 m (17,090 ft)
- Mouth: Ganges
  - location: Ganges Delta
  - coordinates: 23°47′46.7376″N 89°45′45.774″E
  - elevation: 0 m (0 ft)
- Length: 2,880 km (1,790 mi) 3,080 km (1,910 mi) (Note: The river is 3,969 km (2,466 mi) long according to the new findings, while previous documents showed its length varied from 2880 to 3364 km.)
- Basin size: 625,726.9 km^{2} (241,594.5 mi^{2})
- Discharge
  - location: Confluence of the Ganges
  - average: (Period: 1971–2000)21,319.2 m^{3}/s (752,880 cu ft/s) Brahmaputra (Jamuna)–Old Brahmaputra–Upper Meghna → 26,941.1 m^{3}/s (951,420 cu ft/s)
- Discharge
  - location: Bahadurabad
  - average: (Period: 1980–2012)24,027 m^{3}/s (848,500 cu ft/s) (Period: 2000–2015)21,993 m^{3}/s (776,700 cu ft/s)
  - minimum: 3,280 m^{3}/s (116,000 cu ft/s)
  - maximum: 102,585 m^{3}/s (3,622,800 cu ft/s)
- Discharge
  - location: Guwahati
  - average: (Period: 1971–2000)18,850.4 m^{3}/s (665,700 cu ft/s)
- Discharge
  - location: Dibrugarh
  - average: (Period: 1971–2000)8,722.3 m^{3}/s (308,030 cu ft/s)
- Discharge
  - location: Pasighat
  - average: (Period: 1971–2000)5,016.3 m^{3}/s (177,150 cu ft/s)

Basin features
- Progression: Padma → Meghna → Bay of Bengal
- River system: Ganges River
- Tributaries
  - left: Lhasa, Nyang, Parlung Zangbo, Lohit, Nao Dihing, Buri Dihing, Dangori, Disang, Dikhow, Jhanji, Dhansiri, Kolong, Kopili, Bhorolu, Kulsi, Krishnai, Upper Meghna
  - right: Kameng, Jia Bhoroli, Manas, Beki, Raidak, Jaldhaka, Teesta, Subansiri, Jia dhol, Simen, Pagladia, Sonkosh, Gadadhar

The Brahmaputra (Assamese: [ˈbɹɔɦ.mɔ.put.ɹɔ]) is a trans-boundary river which flows through Southwestern China, Northeastern India, and Bangladesh. It is known as the Brahmaputra in Assam, Yarlung Tsangpo in Tibetan, the Siang/Dihang River in the Mishmi language, and Jamuna River in Bangladesh. By itself, it is the 9th largest river in the world by discharge, and the 15th longest.

It originates in the Manasarovar Lake region, near Mount Kailash, on the northern side of the Himalayas in Burang County of Tibet where it is known as the Yarlung Tsangpo River. The Brahmaputra flows along southern Tibet to break through the Himalayas in great gorges (including the Yarlung Tsangpo Grand Canyon) and into Arunachal Pradesh. It enters India near the village of Gelling in Arunachal Pradesh and flows southwest through the Assam Valley as the Brahmaputra and south through Bangladesh as the Jamuna (not to be confused with the Yamuna of India). In the vast Ganges Delta, it merges with the Ganges, popularly known as the Padma in Bangladesh, and becomes the Meghna and ultimately empties into the Bay of Bengal.

At 3,000 km (1,900 mi) long, the Brahmaputra is an important river for irrigation and transportation in the region. The average depth of the river is 30 m (100 ft) and its maximum depth is 135 m (440 ft) (at Sadiya). The river is prone to catastrophic flooding in the spring when the Himalayan snow melts. The average discharge of the Brahmaputra is about ~22,000 m^{3}/s (780,000 cu ft/s), and floods reach about 103,000 m^{3}/s (3,600,000 cu ft/s). It is a classic example of a braided river and is highly susceptible to channel migration and avulsion. It is also one of the few rivers in the world that exhibits a tidal bore. It is navigable for most of its length.

The Brahmaputra drains the Himalayas east of the Indo-Nepal border, south-central portion of the Tibetan plateau above the Ganga basin, south-eastern portion of Tibet, the Patkai hills, the northern slopes of the Meghalaya hills, the Assam plains, and northern Bangladesh. The basin, especially south of Tibet, is characterized by high levels of rainfall. Kangchenjunga (8,586 m) is the highest point within the Brahmaputra basin and the only peak above 8,000 m.

The Brahmaputra's upper course was long unknown, and its identity with the Yarlung Tsangpo was only established by exploration in 1884–1886. The river is often called the Tsangpo-Brahmaputra river.

The lower reaches are sacred to Hindus. While most rivers on the Indian subcontinent have female names, this river has a rare male name. Brahmaputra means "son of Brahma" in Sanskrit.

== Names ==
It is known by various names in different regional languages: Brôhmôputrô and Luit in Assamese; Tibetan: ཡར་ཀླུངས་གཙང་པོ་, Wylie: yar klung gtsang po Yarlung Tsangpo; simplified Chinese: 雅鲁藏布江; traditional Chinese: 雅魯藏布江; pinyin: Yǎlǔzàngbù Jiāng. It is also called Tsangpo-Brahmaputra and red river of India (when referring to the whole river including the stretch within the Tibet Autonomous Region). In its Tibetan and Indian names, the river is unusually masculine in gender.

== Geography ==
=== Course ===
==== Tibet ====
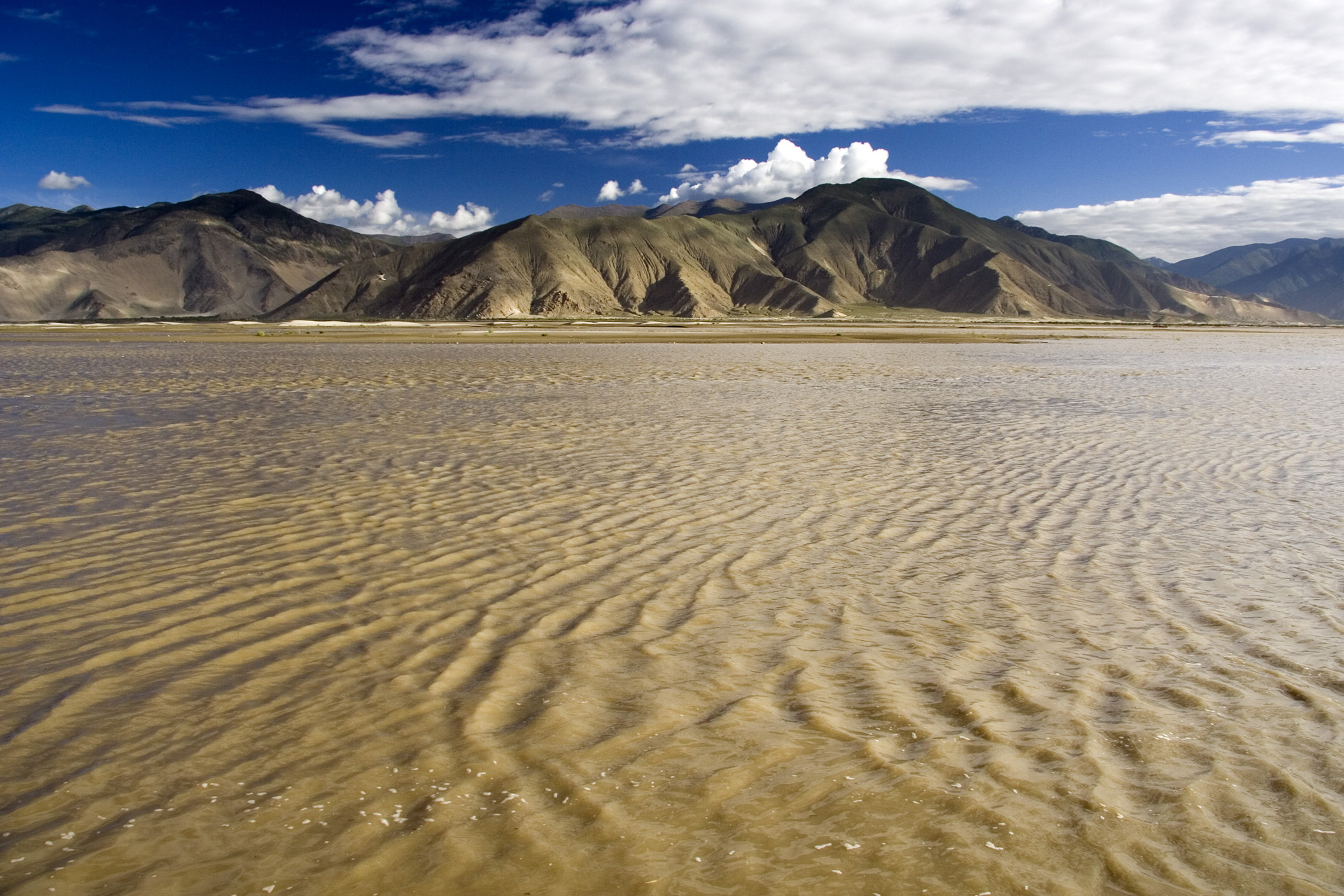
Yarlung Tsangpo River in Tibet

The upper reaches of the Brahmaputra River, known as the Yarlung Tsangpo from the Tibetan language, originate on the Angsi Glacier, near Mount Kailash, located on the northern side of the Himalayas in Burang County of Tibet. The source of the river was earlier thought to be on the Chemayungdung glacier, which covers the slopes of the Himalayas about 60 mi (97 km) southeast of Lake Manasarovar in southwestern Tibet.

From its source, the river runs for nearly 1,100 km (680 mi) in a generally easterly direction between the main range of the Himalayas to the south and the Kailas Range to the north.

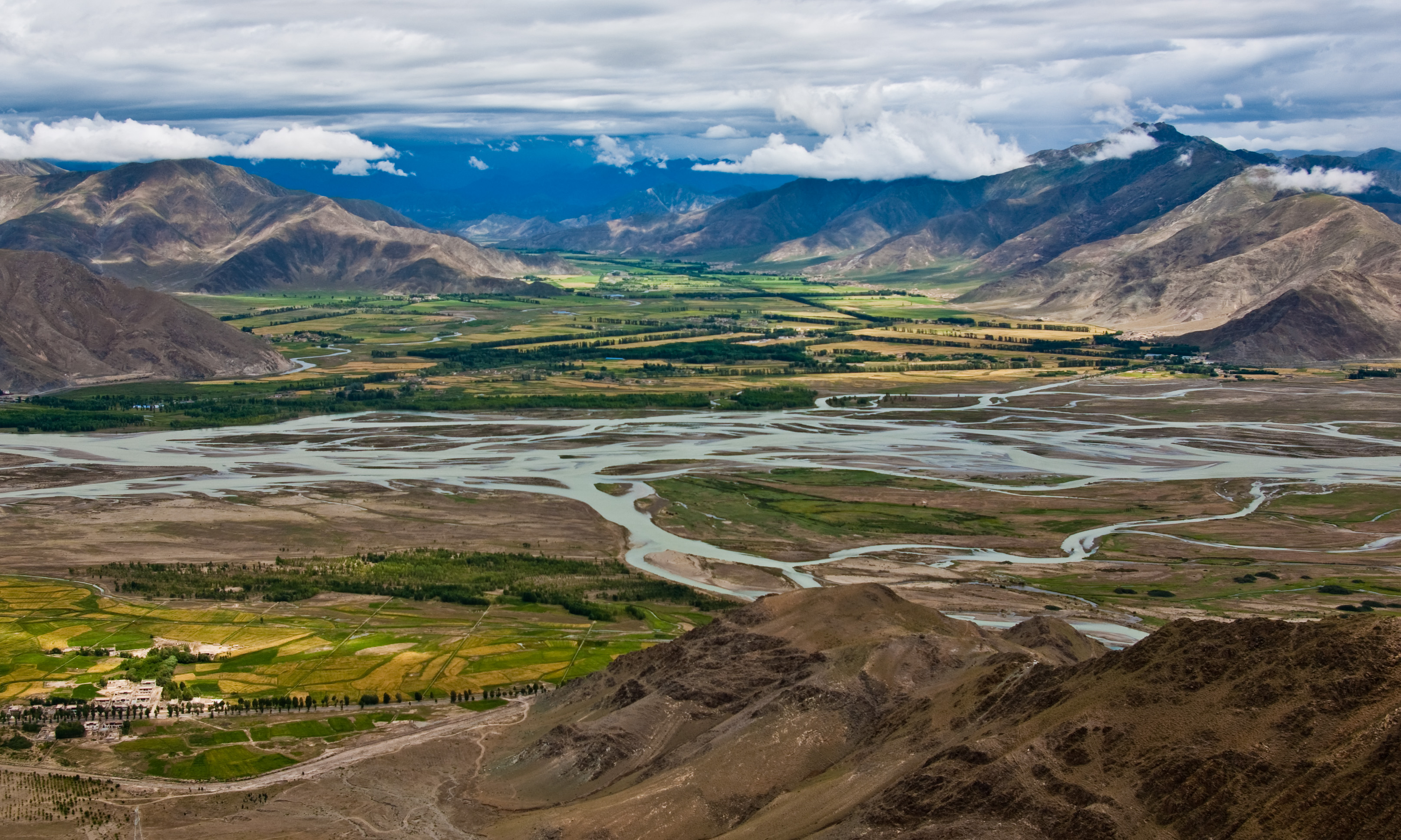
Yarlung Tsangpo

In Tibet, the Tsangpo receives a number of tributaries. The most important left-bank tributaries are the Raka Zangbo (Raka Tsangpo), which joins the river west of Xigazê (Shigatse), and the Lhasa (Kyi), which flows past the Tibetan capital of Lhasa and joins the Tsangpo at Qüxü. The Nyang River joins the Tsangpo from the north at Zela (Tsela Dzong). On the right bank, a second river called the Nyang Qu (Nyang Chu) meets the Tsangpo at Xigazê.

After passing Pi (Pe) in Tibet, the river turns suddenly to the north and northeast and cuts a course through a succession of great narrow gorges between the mountainous massifs of Gyala Peri and Namcha Barwa in a series of rapids and cascades. Thereafter, the river turns south and southwest and flows through a deep gorge (the "Yarlung Tsangpo Grand Canyon") across the eastern extremity of the Himalayas with canyon walls that extend upward for 5,000 m (16,000 ft) and more on each side. During that stretch, the river crosses the China-India line of actual control to enter northern Arunachal Pradesh, where it is known as the Dihang (or Siang) River, and turns more southerly.

==== Arunachal Pradesh ====
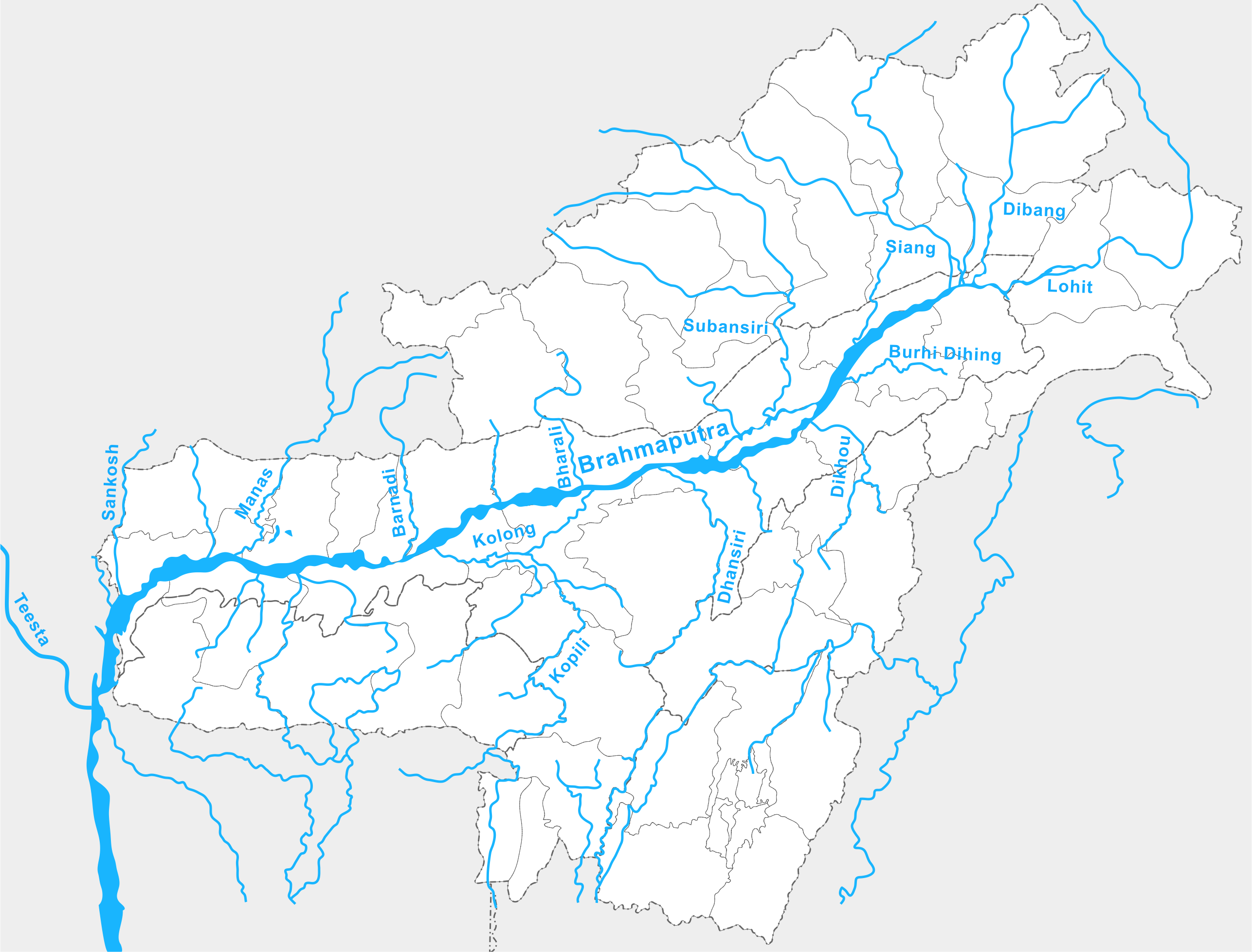
Brahmaputra basin in India

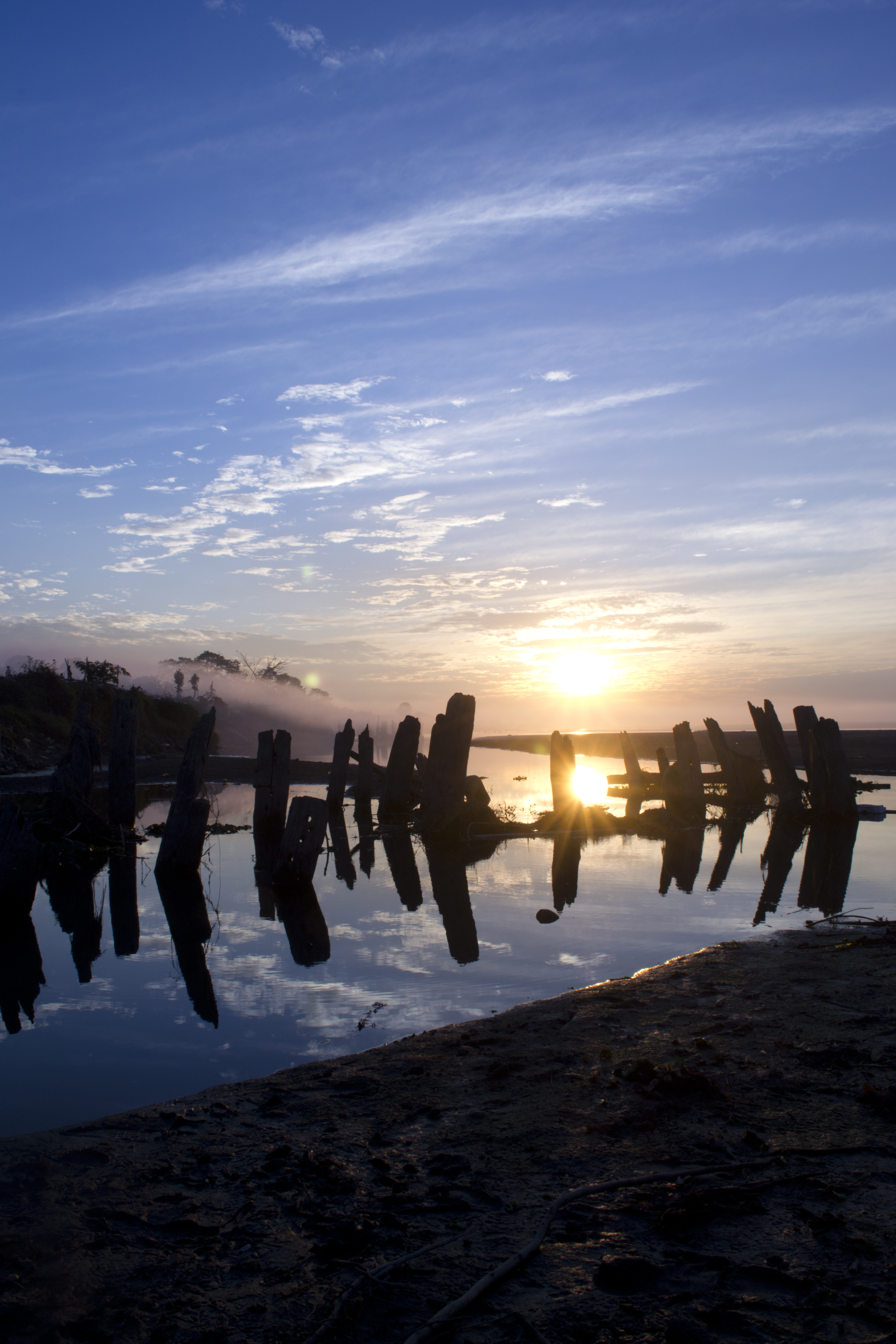
A view of sunset in the Brahmaputra from Dibrugarh

The Yarlung Tsangpo leaves the part of Tibet to enter Indian state of Arunachal Pradesh, where the river is called Siang. It makes a very rapid descent from its original height in Tibet and finally appears in the plains, where it is called Dihang. It flows for about 35 km (22 mi) southward after which, it is joined by the Dibang River and the Lohit River at the head of the Assam Valley. Below the Lohit, the river is called Brahmaputra and Doima (mother of water) and Burlung-Buthur by native Bodo tribals, it then enters the state of Assam, and becomes very wide—as wide as 20 km (12 mi) in parts of Assam.

The reason for such an unusual course and drastic change is that the river is antecedent to the Himalayas, meaning that it had existed before them and has entrenched itself since they started rising.

==== Assam ====
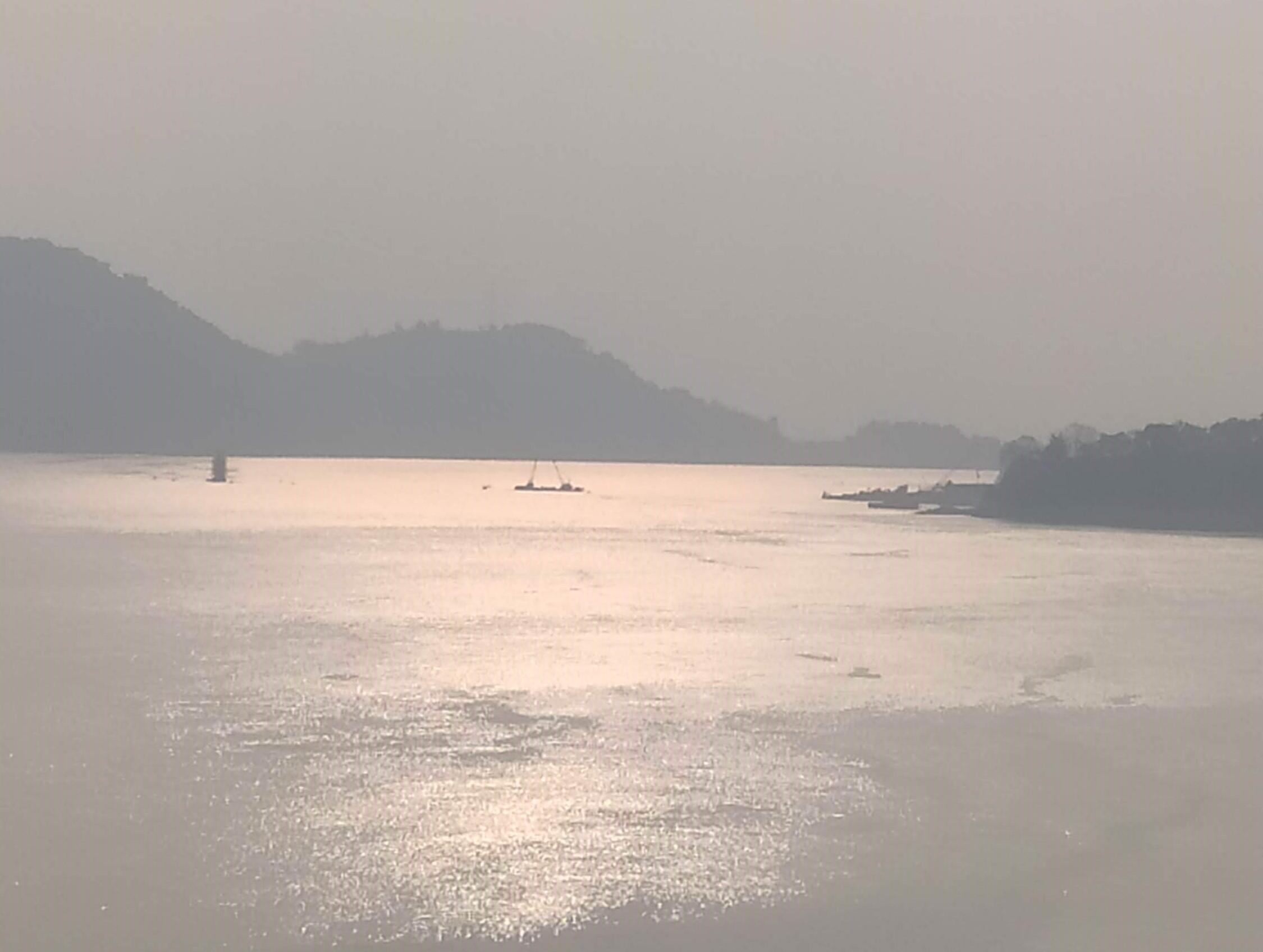
Bank of Brahmaputra River in Guwahati

The Dihang, winding out of the mountains, turns towards the southeast and descends into a low-lying basin as it enters northeastern Assam state. Just west of the town of Sadiya, the river again turns to the southwest and is joined by two mountain streams, the Lohit, and the Dibang. Below that confluence, about 1,450 km (900 mi) from the Bay of Bengal, the river becomes known conventionally as the Brahmaputra ("Son of Brahma"). In Assam, the river is mighty, even in the dry season, and during the rains, its banks are more than 8 km (5.0 mi) apart. As the river follows its braided 700 km (430 mi) course through the valley, it receives several rapidly flowing Himalayan streams, including the Subansiri, Kameng, Bharali, Dhansiri, Manas, Champamati, Saralbhanga, and Sankosh Rivers. The main tributaries from the hills and from the plateau to the south are the Burhi Dihing, the Disang, the Dikhow, and the Kopili.

Between Dibrugarh and Lakhimpur Districts, the river divides into two channels—the northern Kherkutia channel and the southern Brahmaputra channel. The two channels join again about 100 km (62 mi) downstream, forming the Majuli island, which is the largest river island in the world. At Guwahati, near the ancient pilgrimage centre of Hajo, the Brahmaputra cuts through the rocks of the Shillong Plateau, and is at its narrowest at 1 km (1,100 yd) bank-to-bank. The terrain of this area made it logistically ideal for the Battle of Saraighat, the military confrontation between the Mughal Empire and the Ahom Kingdom in March 1671. The first combined railroad/roadway bridge across the Brahmaputra was constructed at Saraighat. It was opened to traffic in April 1962.

The environment of the Brahmaputra floodplains in Assam have been described as the Brahmaputra Valley semi-evergreen forests ecoregion.

==== Bangladesh ====
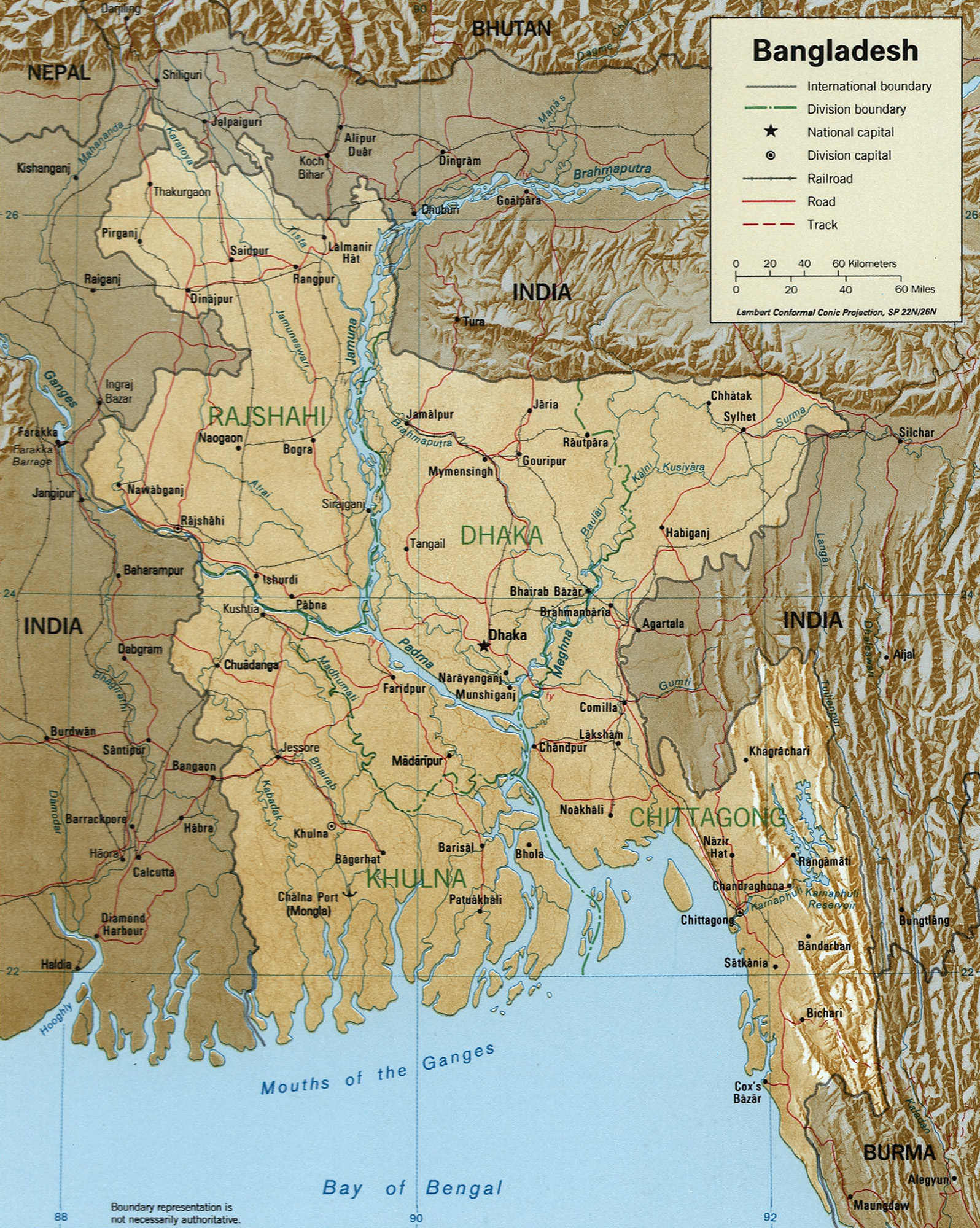
Rivers of Bangladesh, including the Brahmaputra

In Bangladesh, the Brahmaputra is joined by the Teesta River (or Tista), one of its largest tributaries. Below the Tista, the Brahmaputra splits into two distributary branches. The western branch, which contains the majority of the river's flow, continues due south as the Jamuna (Jomuna) to merge with the lower Ganga, called the Padma River (Pôdma). The eastern branch, formerly the larger, but now much smaller, is called the lower or Old Brahmaputra (Brommoputro). It curves southeast to join the Meghna River near Dhaka. The Padma and Meghna converge near Chandpur and flow out into the Bay of Bengal. This final part of the river is called Meghna.

The Brahmaputra enters the plains of Bangladesh after turning south around the Garo Hills right below Dhuburi, India. After flowing past Chilmari, Bangladesh, it is joined on its right bank by the Tista River and then follows a 240 km (150 mi) course due south as the Jamuna River. (South of Gaibanda, the Old Brahmaputra leaves the left bank of the mainstream and flows past Jamalpur and Mymensingh to join the Meghna River at Bhairab Bazar.) Before its confluence with the Ganga, the Jamuna receives the combined waters of the Baral, Atrai, and Hurasagar Rivers on its right bank and becomes the point of departure of the large Dhaleswari River on its left bank. A tributary of the Dhaleswari, the Buriganga ("Old Ganga"), flows past Dhaka, the capital of Bangladesh, and joins the Meghna River above Munshiganj.

The Jamuna joins with the Ganga north of Goalundo Ghat, below which, as the Padma, their combined waters flow to the southeast for a distance of about 120 km (75 mi). After several smaller channels branch off to feed the Ganga-Brahmaputra delta to the south, the main body of the Padma reaches its confluence with the Meghna River near Chandpur and then enters the Bay of Bengal through the Meghna estuary and lesser channels flowing through the delta. The growth of the Ganga-Brahmaputra Delta is dominated by tidal processes.

The Ganga Delta, fed by the waters of numerous rivers, including the Ganga and Brahmaputra, is 105,000 km^{2} (41,000 mi^{2}), one of the largest river deltas in the world.

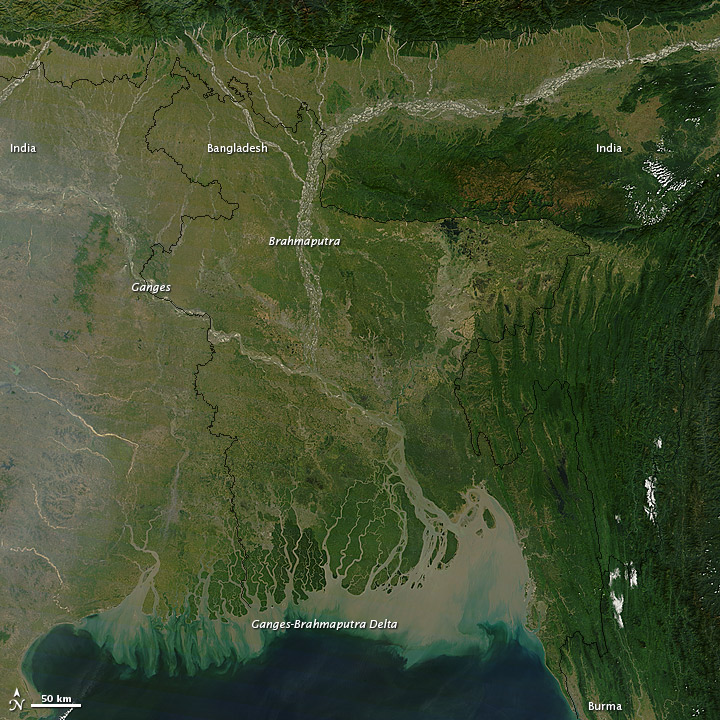
The Brahmaputra River from outer space

=== Hydrology ===
The Ganges–Brahmaputra–Meghna system has the second-greatest average discharge of the world's rivers—roughly ~44,000 m^{3}/s (1,600,000 cu ft/s), and the river Brahmaputra alone supplies about 50% of the total discharge. The rivers' combined suspended sediment load of about 1.87 billion tonnes (1.84 billion tons) per year is the world's highest.

In the past, the lower course of the Brahmaputra was different and passed through the Jamalpur and Mymensingh districts. In an 8.8 magnitude earthquake on 2 April 1762, however, the main channel of the Brahmaputra at Bhahadurabad point was switched southwards and opened as Jamuna due to the result of tectonic uplift of the Madhupur tract.

==== Climate ====
Rising temperatures significantly contribute to snow melting in the upper Brahmaputra catchment. The discharge of the Brahmaputra River is significantly influenced by the melting of snow in the upper part of its catchment area. This increase in river flow, caused by the substantial retreat of snow, leads to a higher downstream discharge. Such a rise in discharge often results in severe catastrophic issues, including flooding and erosion.

==== Discharge ====
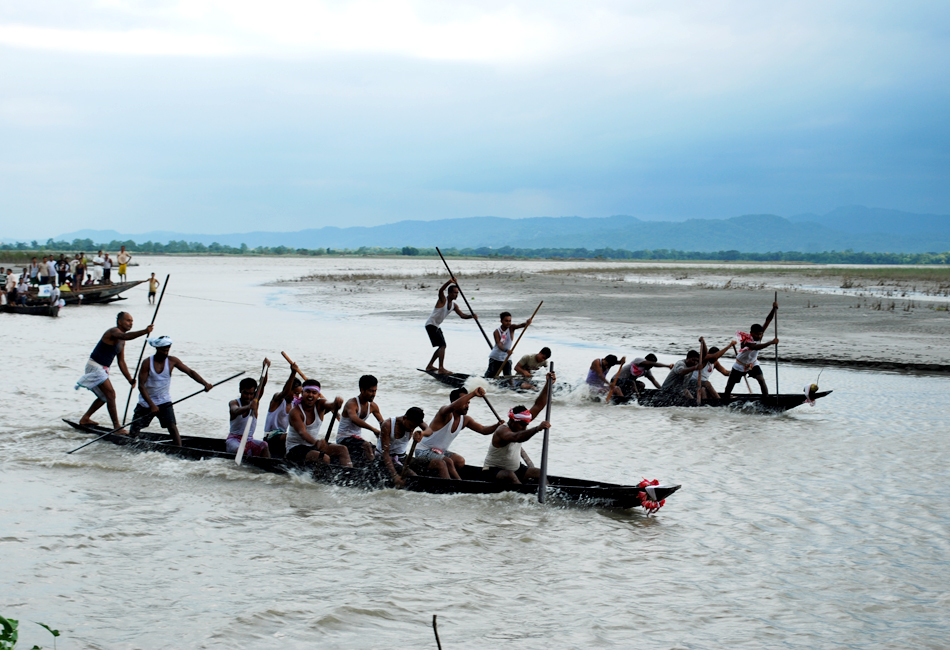
Rowing competition of Sualkuchi at Brahmaputra River

The Brahmaputra River is characterized by its significant rates of sediment discharge, the large and variable flows, along with its rapid channel aggradations and accelerated rates of basin denudation. Over time, the deepening of the Bengal Basin caused by erosion will result in the increase in hydraulic radius, and hence allowing for the huge accumulation of sediments fed from the Himalayan erosion by efficient sediment transportation. The thickness of the sediment accumulated above the Precambrian basement has increased over the years from a few hundred meters to over 18 km (11 mi) in the Bengal fore-deep to the south. The ongoing subsidence of the Bengal Basin and the high rate of Himalayan uplift continues to contribute to the large water and sediment discharges of fine sand and silt, with 1% clay, in the Brahmaputra River.

Climatic change plays a crucial role in affecting the basin hydrology. Throughout the year, there is a significant rise in hydrograph, with a broad peak between July and September. The Brahmaputra River experiences two high-water seasons, one in early summer caused by snowmelt in the mountains, and one in late summer caused by runoff from monsoon rains. The river flow is strongly influenced by snow and ice melting of the glaciers, which are located mainly on the eastern Himalaya regions in the upstream parts of the basin. The snow and glacier melt contribution to the total annual runoff is about 27%, while the annual rainfall contributes to about 1.9 m (6 ft 3 in) and 22,000 m^{3}/s (780,000 cu ft/s) of discharge. The highest recorded daily discharge in the Brahmaputra at Pandu was 72,726 m^{3}/s (2,568,300 cu ft/s) August 1962 while the lowest was 1,757 m^{3}/s (62,000 cu ft/s) in February 1968. The increased rates of snow and glacial melt are likely to increase summer flows in some river systems for a few decades, followed by a reduction in flow as the glaciers disappear and snowfall diminishes. This is particularly true for the dry season when water availability is crucial for the irrigation systems.

==== Floodplain evolution ====
The course of the Brahmaputra River has changed drastically in the past two and a half centuries, moving its river course westwards for a distance of about 80 km (50 mi), leaving its old river course, appropriately named the old Brahmaputra river, behind. In the past, the floodplain of the old river course had soils which were more properly formed compared to graded sediments on the operating Jamuna river. This change of river course resulted in modifications to the soil-forming process, which include acidification, the breakdown of clays and buildup of organic matter, with the soils showing an increasing amount of biotic homogenization, mottling, the coating around Peds and maturing soil arrangement, shape and pattern. In the future, the consequences of local ground subsidence coupled with flood prevention propositions, for instance, localised breakwaters, that increase flood-plain water depths outside the water breakers, may alter the water levels of the floodplains. Throughout the years, bars, scroll bars, and sand dunes are formed at the edge of the flood plain by deposition. The height difference of the channel topography is often not more than 1–2 m (3–7 ft). Furthermore, flooding over the history of the river has caused the formation of river levees due to deposition from the overbank flow. The height difference between the levee top and the surrounding floodplains is typically 1 m (3 ft) along small channels and 2–3 m (7–10 ft) along major channels. Crevasse splay, a sedimentary fluvial deposit which forms when a stream breaks its natural or artificial levees and deposits sediment on a floodplain, are often formed due to a breach in the levee, forming a lobe of sediments which progrades onto the adjacent floodplain. Lastly, flood basins are often formed between the levees of adjacent rivers.

==== Flooding ====
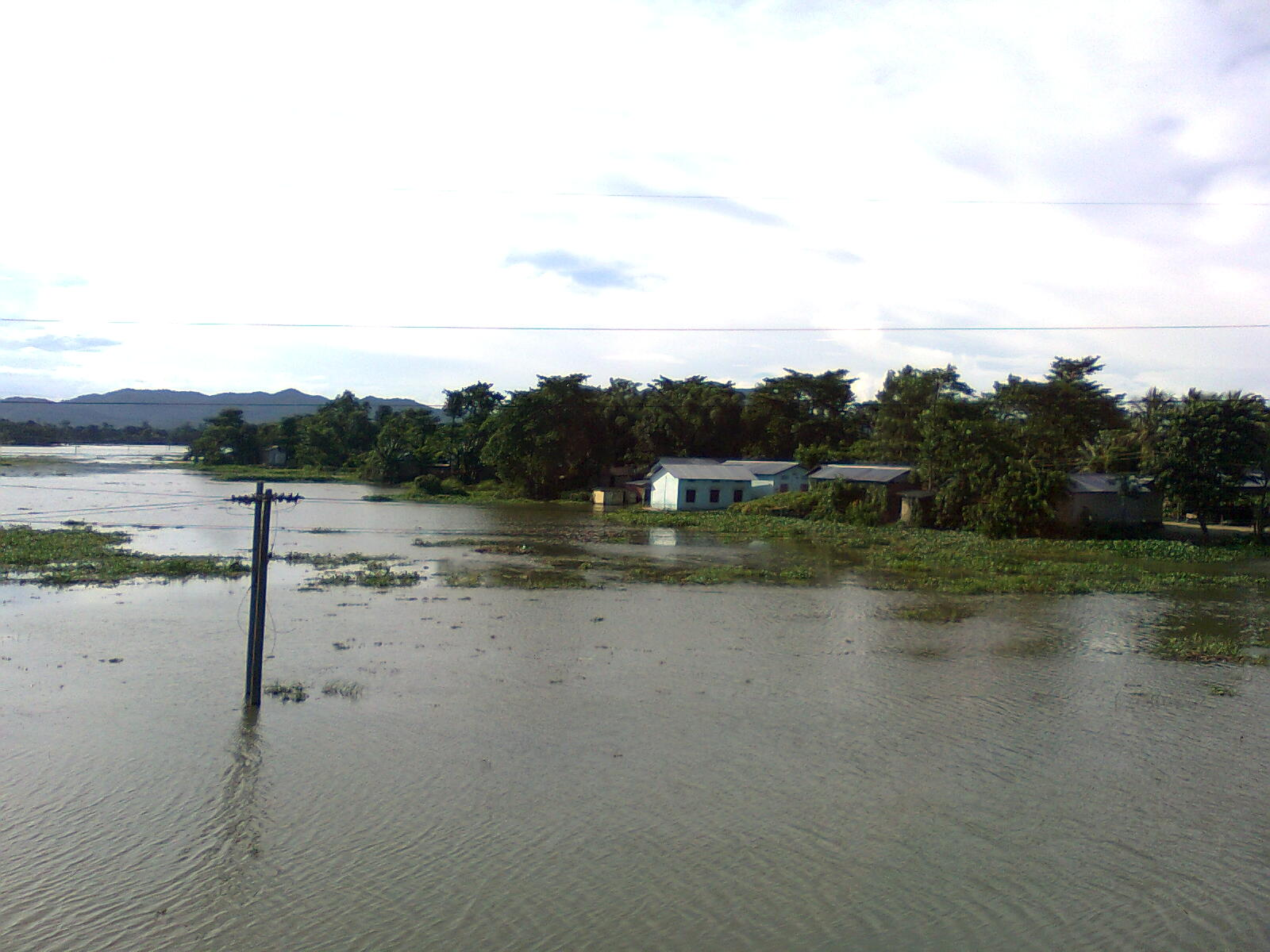
Flooded villages along the Brahmaputra

During the monsoon season (June–October), floods are a very common occurrence. Deforestation in the Brahmaputra watershed has resulted in increased siltation levels, flash floods, and soil erosion in critical downstream habitat, such as the Kaziranga National Park in middle Assam. Occasionally, massive flooding causes huge losses to crops, life, and property. Periodic flooding is a natural phenomenon which is ecologically important because it helps maintain the lowland grasslands and associated wildlife. Periodic floods also deposit fresh alluvium, replenishing the fertile soil of the Brahmaputra River Valley. Thus flooding, agriculture, and agricultural practices are closely connected.

The effects of flooding can be devastating and cause significant damage to crops and houses, serious bank erosive with consequent loss of homesteads, school and land, and loss of many lives, livestock, and fisheries. During the 1998 flood, over 70% of the land area of Bangladesh was inundated, affecting 31 million people and 1 million homesteads. In the 1998 flood which had an unusually long duration from July to September, claimed 918 human lives and was responsible for damaging 1,600 km (990 mi) of roads and 6,000 km (3,700 mi) embankments, and affecting 6,000 km^{2} (2,300 sq mi) of standing crops. The 2004 floods, over 25% of the population of Bangladesh or 36 million people, were affected by the floods; 800 people died; 952 000 houses were destroyed and 1.4 million were badly damaged; 24 000 educational institutions were affected including the destruction of 1200 primary schools, 2 million governments and private tube wells were affected, over 3 million latrines were damaged or washed away, this increases the risks of waterborne diseases including diarrhea and cholera. Also, 1.1 million ha (2.7 million acres) of the rice crop was submerged and lost before it could be harvested, with 7% of the yearly aus (early season) rice crop lost; 270,000 ha (670,000 acres) of grazing land was affected, 5600 livestock perished together with 254 00 poultry and 63 million tonnes (69 million short tons) of lost fish production.

Flood-control measures are taken by the water resource department and the Brahmaputra Board, but until now the flood problem remains unsolved. At least a third of the land of Majuli Island has been eroded by the river. Recently, it is suggested that a highway protected by concrete mat along the river bank and excavation of the river bed can curb this menace. This project, named the Brahmaputra River Restoration Project, is yet to be implemented by the government. Recently the Central Government approved the construction of Brahmaputra Express Highways.

=== Channel morphology ===
The course of the Brahmaputra River has changed dramatically over the past 250 years, with evidence of large-scale avulsion, in the period 1776–1850, of 80 km (50 mi) from east of the Madhupur tract to the west of it. Prior to 1843, the Brahmaputra flowed within the channel now termed the "Old Brahmaputra". The banks of the river are mostly weakly cohesive sand and silts, which usually erodes through large scale slab failure, where previously deposited materials undergo scour and bank erosion during flood periods. Presently, the river's erosion rate has decreased to 30 m (98 ft) per year as compared to 150 m (490 ft) per year from 1973 to 1992. This erosion has, however, destroyed so much land that it has caused 0.7 million people to become homeless due to loss of land.

Several studies have discussed the reasons for the avulsion of the river into its present course, and have suggested a number of reasons including tectonic activity, switches in the upstream course of the Teesta River, the influence of increased discharge, catastrophic floods and river capture into an old river course. From an analysis of maps of the river between 1776 and 1843, it was concluded in a study that the river avulsion was more likely gradual than catastrophic and sudden, and may have been generated by bank erosion, perhaps around a large mid-channel bar, causing a diversion of the channel into the existing floodplain channel.

The Brahmaputra channel is governed by the peak and low flow periods during which its bed undergoes tremendous modification. The Brahmaputra's bank line migration is inconsistent with time. The Brahmaputra river bed has widened significantly since 1916 and appears to be shifting more towards the south than towards the north. Together with the contemporary slow migration of the river, the left bank is being eroded away faster than the right bank.

==== River engineering ====
The Brahmaputra River experiences high levels of bank erosion (usually via slab failure) and channel migration caused by its strong current, lack of riverbank vegetation, and loose sand and silt which compose its banks. It is thus difficult to build permanent structures on the river, and protective structures designed to limit the river's erosional effects often face numerous issues during and after construction. In fact, a 2004 report by the Bangladesh Disaster and Emergency Sub-Group (BDER) has stated that several of such protective systems have 'just failed'. However, some progress has been made in the form of construction works which stabilize sections of the river, albeit with the need for heavy maintenance. The Bangabandhu Bridge, the only bridge to span the river's major distributary, the Jamuna, was thus opened in June 1998. Constructed at a narrow braid belt of the river, it is 4.8 km (3.0 mi) long with a platform 18.5 m (61 ft) wide, and it is used to carry railroad traffic as well as gas, power and telecommunication lines. Due to the variable nature of the river, the prediction of the river's future course is crucial in planning upstream engineering to prevent flooding on the bridge.

China built the Zangmu Dam in the upper course of the Brahmaputra River in the Tibet region and it was operationalised on 13 October 2015.

== Tributaries ==
The main tributaries from the mouth:

Left tributary	Right tributary	Length (km)	Basin size (km^{2})	Average discharge (m^{3}/s)^{*}
Old Brahmaputra
Upper Meghna–Kalni–Kushyiara–Barak		1,040	85,385	5,603.2
Shaldha			555.3	28
Beltoly			232.7	11.6
Jamuna
	Atrai–Gumani	390	22,876.1	800.9
	Ghaghat–Alay	148	1,388.6	46.6
Jinjiram			2,798.5	103
	Teesta	414	12,466.1	463.2
	Dharla–Jaldhaka	289	5,929.4	245.1
	Torsa		12,183	361.7
Middle Brahmaputra
	Gangadhar (Sunkosh)		11,413.9	231.5
	Tipkai–Gaurang	108	3,202.9	118.7
	Champabuti (Bhur)	135	1,259.3	43.1
Krishnai		105	2,251.5	82.3
	Manas–Beki	400	36,835.1	875
Kulsi		220	4,615.2	339.7
	Puthimari	190	2,737.4	149.7
Kalbog Nadi			283.7	23.4
Kopili (Kalang)		297	19,705.7	1,802
Pokoriya (Kolong)			1,265.5	103.3
	Bhola		726.2	69.2
	Tangni		500.9	40.4
	Dhansiri Nadi	123	1,821.8	122.2
Leteri			305.7	24.4
	Belsiri Nadi		808.7	67.1
	Gabhara Nadi		697.7	57.8
	Kameng (Bhareli)	264	10,841.3	780.8
	Gamiripal		262.4	22.2
Diphlu			1,050.3	91.3
	Bargang	42	640.5	57.5
	Bihmāri Nadi		208.4	18.6
	Baroi	64	712.7	68.5
	Holongi	167	970.9	92.2
Dhansiri		352	12,780.1	978.9
	Subansiri	518	34,833.1	3,153.4
	Tuni		186.3	20.2
Jhānzi		108	2,102.2	213.3
Dikhu		200	3,268.7	359
Disang		253	4,415.1	477.8
Burhi Dihing		380	5,975.2	652.8
	Simen	68.5	1,438	232.1
	Poba		599.1	89.4
Lohit		560	29,330.1	2,138.2
Dibang		324	12,502.5	1,337.2
Siang
	Mora Lāli Korong		201.2	30.1
Siku			254.8	40.7
Yamne			1,266.3	205.6
	Sireng			11
	Yembung		171	30
	Sike (Siyom)	170	5,818.3	843.4
	Simyuk (Simaang)			12.1
	Siring		143.2	21.3
	Angong		141.4	19.9
	Niogang (Sirapatang)		151.2	21.5
	Shapateng		1,044.5	88.9
	Siyi (Pall Si)		154.8	14.6
	Ringong (Ripong Asi)		785.6	53.3
Yang Sang Chu			1,302.1	156
Yarlung Tsangpo
	Nagöng (Lugong)		314.6	17.4
Nilechu			134.2	10
	Baimu Xiri		695.2	33.9
Sikong			273.6	18.8
Simo Chu			636.7	37.6
Chimdro Chu			2,161.3	99.2
	Yanglang		451.1	20.5
Parlung Zangbo		266	28,631	867.6
Nyang		307.5	17,928.7	441.9
	Nanyi		633.3	42.2
Ga Sacouren			1,119.9	32.7
	Lilong		1,562.9	89.6
Mulucuo			1,150.1	23.7
	Jindong Qu		958.1	26.7
Baqu Qu			1,624.6	23
Zengqiqu			1,453.5	12
	Momequ		2,029.7	23.1
	Yalong	68	2,263.9	26
Lhasa		568	32,471	335
Nima Maqu		83	2,385.9	11.9
	Menqu	73	11,437.1	102.1
Wuyu Maqu			1,609.8	3.4
Xiangqu Qu			7,427.6	21.2
	Nyang Qu (Nianchu)	217	14,231.9	77.6
Nadong			2,422.5	8.4
	Xiabu		5,467.2	20.5
Dogxung Zangbo		303	19,885.7	58.2
	Sa'gya Zangbo		1,489.2	6.8
	Ji		1,647.3	5.4
Naxiong			5,771.9	74.5
	Mang Zhaxiongqu		524.1	14.8
	Galixiong		411.1	12.3
	Xuede Zangbu		807	25.5
	Jiajizi		1,391	24.8
Menqu Qu			1,236.9	7.1
Chai (Tsa Chu)			4,319.6	9.7
	Maquan (Matsang Tsangpo)	270	21,502.3	164

^{*}Period: 1971–2000

== History ==
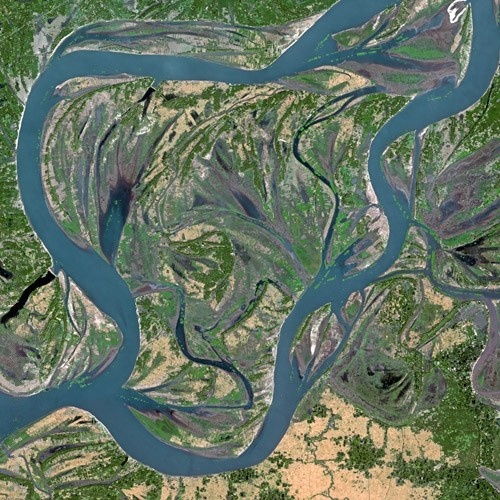
Brahmaputra River seen from a SPOT satellite

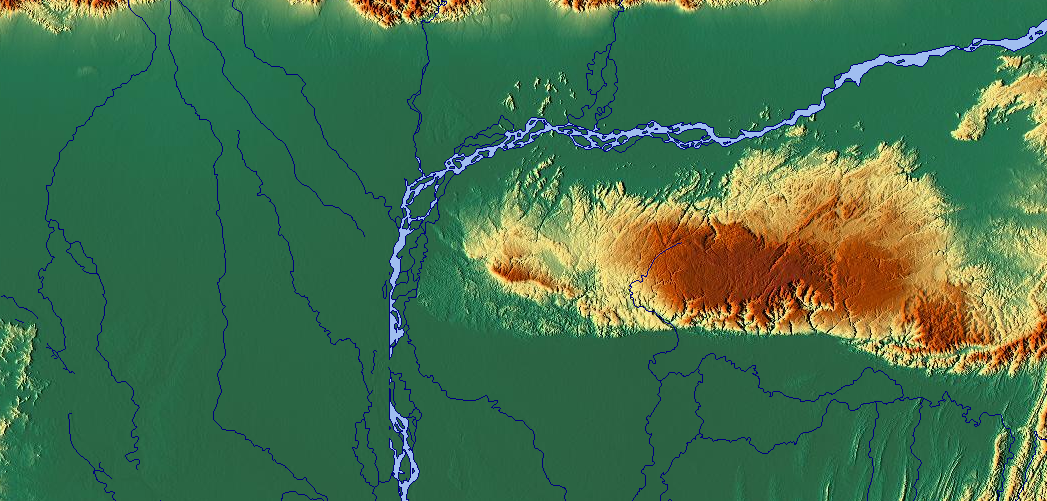
The Brahmaputra and its tributaries in northeastern India and Bangladesh

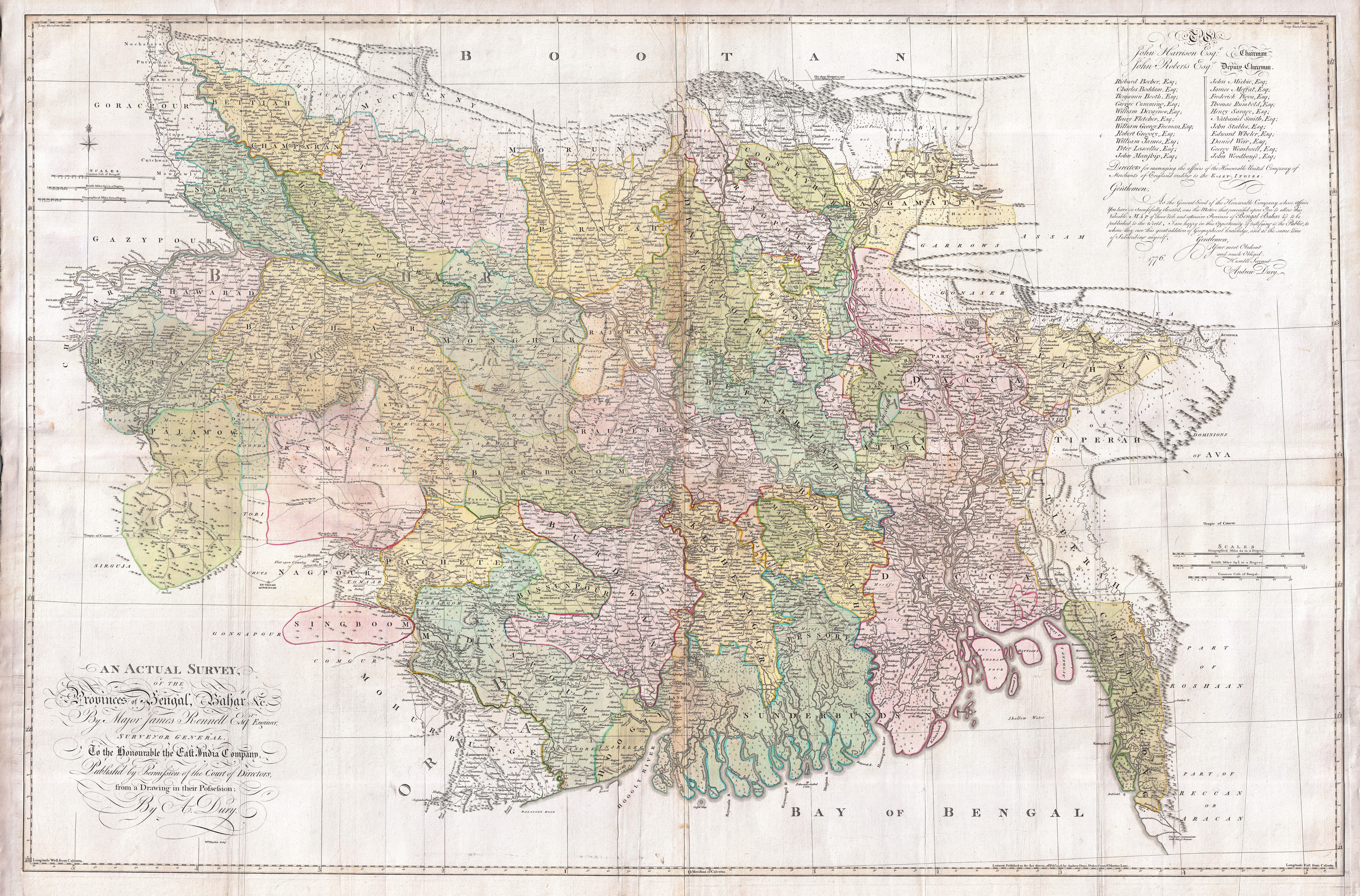
James Rennell's 1776 map shows the Brahmaputra's flow before an earthquake on 2 April 1762 and the Teesta River flowing in three channels to the Ganga before a flood in 1787.

=== Earlier history ===
The Kachari group called the river "Dilao", "Tilao". Early Greek accounts of Curtius and Strabo give its name as Dyardanes (Ancient greek Δυαρδάνης) and Oidanes. In the past, the course of the lower Brahmaputra was different and passed through the Jamalpur and Mymensingh districts. Some water still flows through that course, now called the Old Brahmaputra, as a distributary of the main channel.

A question about the river system in Bangladesh is when and why the Brahmaputra changed its main course, at the site of the Jamuna and the "Old Brahmaputra" fork that can be seen by comparing modern maps to historic maps before the 1800s. The Brahmaputra likely flowed directly south along its present main channel for much of the time since the Last Glacial Maximum, switching back and forth between the two courses several times throughout the Holocene.

One idea about the most recent avulsion is that the change in the course of the main waters of the Brahmaputra took place suddenly in 1787, the year of the heavy flooding of the river Tista.

In the middle of the 18th century, at least three fair-sized streams flowed between the Rajshahi and Dhaka Divisions, viz., the Daokoba, a branch of the Tista, the Monash or Konai, and the Salangi. The Lahajang and the Elengjany were also important rivers. In Renault's time, the Brahmaputra as a first step towards securing a more direct course to the sea by leaving the Mahdupur Jungle to the east began to send a considerable volume of water down the Jinai or Jabuna from Jamalpur into the Monash and Salangi. These rivers gradually coalesced and kept shifting to the west till they met the Daokoba, which was showing an equally rapid tendency to cut towards the east. The junction of these rivers gave the Brahmaputra a course worthy of her immense power, and the rivers to right and left silted up. In Renault's Altas they very much resemble the rivers of Jessore, which dried up after the hundred-mouthed Ganga had cut her new channel to join the Meghna at the south of the Munshiganj subdivision.

In 1809, Francis Buchanan-Hamilton wrote that the new channel between Bhawanipur and Dewanranj "was scarcely inferior to the mighty river, and threatens to sweep away the intermediate country". By 1830, the old channel had been reduced to its present insignificance. It was navigable by country boats throughout the year and by launches only during rains, but at the point as low as Jamalpur it was formidable throughout the cold weather. Similar was the position for two or three months just below Mymensingh also.

=== International cooperation ===
The waters of the River Brahmaputra are shared by Tibet, India, and Bangladesh. In the 1990s and 2000s, there was repeated speculation that mentioned Chinese plans to build a dam at the Great Bend, with a view to diverting the waters to the north of the country. This has been denied by the Chinese government for many years. At the Kathmandu Workshop of Strategic Foresight Group in August 2009 on Water Security in the Himalayan Region, which brought together in a rare development leading hydrologists from the basin countries, the Chinese scientists argued that it was not feasible for China to undertake such a diversion. However, on 22 April 2010, China confirmed that it was indeed building the Zangmu Dam on the Brahmaputra in Tibet, but assured India that the project would not have any significant effect on the downstream flow to India. This claim has also been reiterated by the Government of India, in an attempt to assuage domestic criticism of Chinese dam construction on the river, but is one that remains hotly debated. Recent years have seen an intensification of grassroots opposition, especially in the state of Assam, against Chinese upstream dam building, as well as growing criticism of the Indian government for its perceived failure to respond appropriately to Chinese hydropower plans.

In a meeting of scientists at Dhaka at 2010, 25 leading experts from the basin countries issued a Dhaka Declaration on Water Security calling for the exchange of information in low-flow periods, and other means of collaboration. Even though the 1997 UN Watercourses Convention does not prevent any of the basin countries from building a dam upstream, customary law offers some relief to the lower riparian countries. There is also the potential for China, India, and Bangladesh to cooperate on transboundary water navigation.

=== Significance to people ===
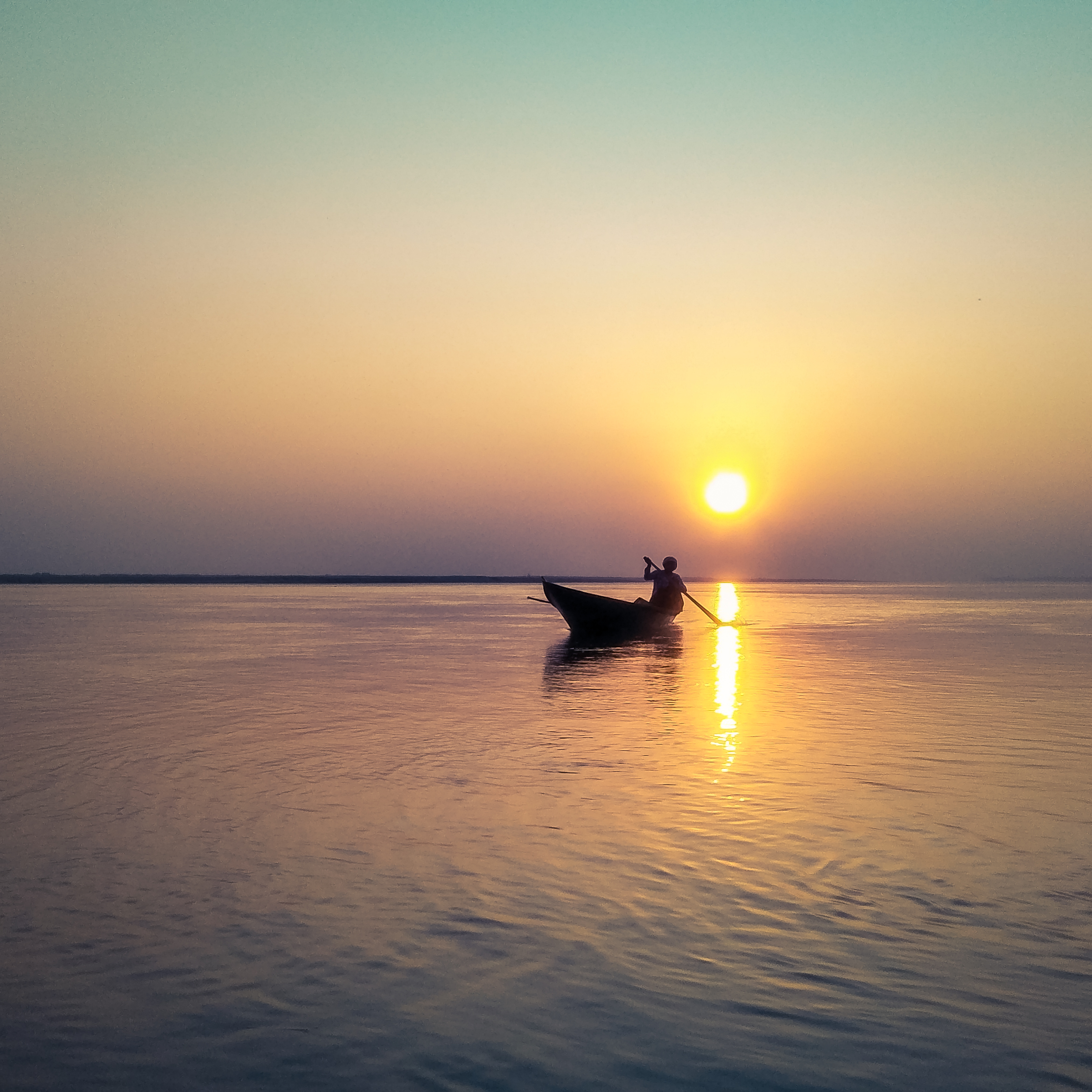
Silhouette of a fisherman on boat during sunset at Brahmaputra River

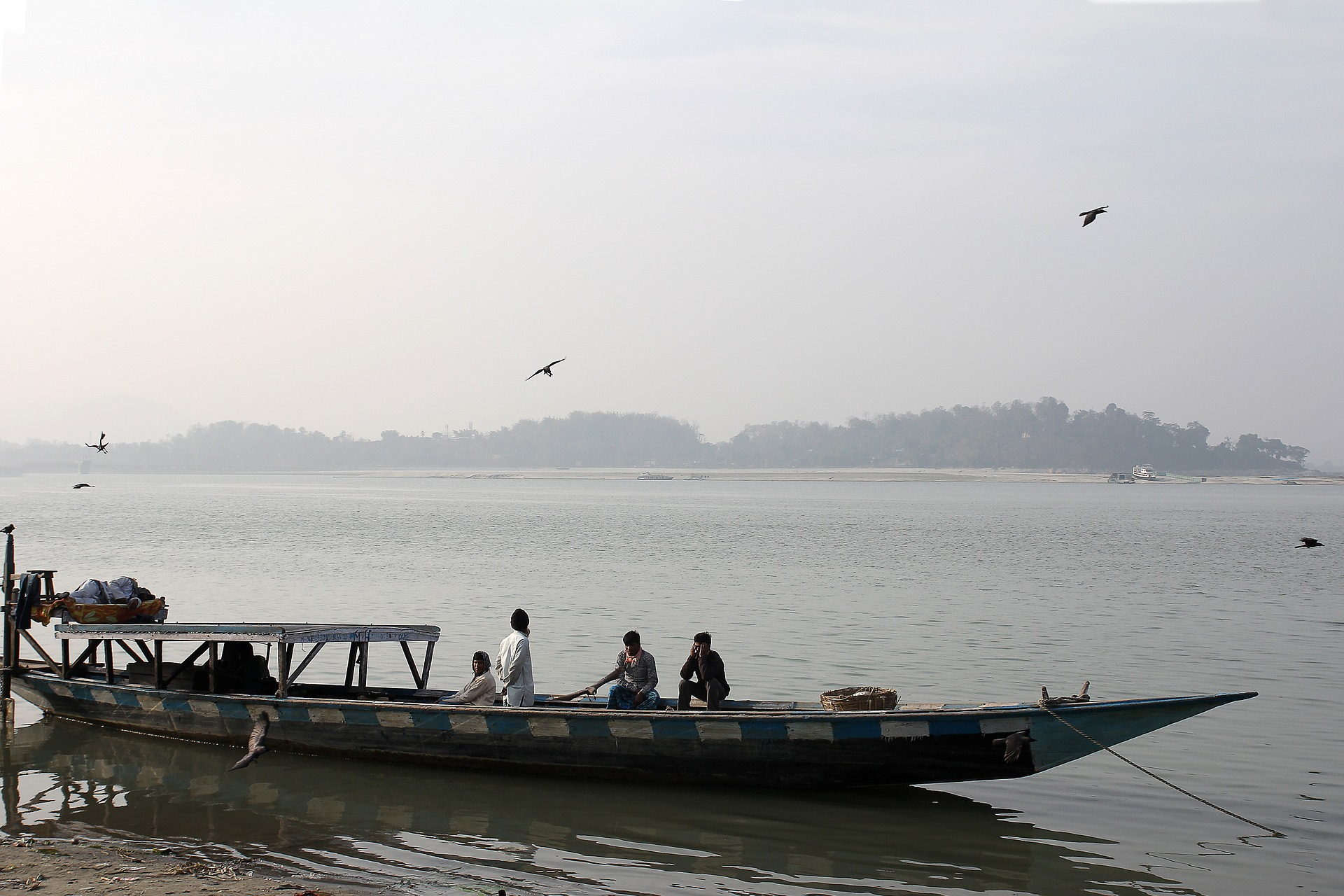
People fishing in the Brahmaputra River

The lives of many millions of Indian and Bangladeshi citizens are reliant on the Brahmaputra River. Its delta is home to 130 million people and 600 000 people live on the riverine islands. These people rely on the annual 'normal' flood to bring moisture and fresh sediments to the floodplain soils, hence providing the necessities for agricultural and marine farming. In fact, two of the three seasonal rice varieties (aus and aman) cannot survive without the floodwater. Furthermore, the fish caught both on the floodplain during flood season and from the many floodplain ponds are the main source of protein for many rural populations.

== Dams and hydropower projects ==
Brahmaputra and Ganges floodwaters can be supplied to most lands in India by constructing a coastal reservoir to store water on the Bay of Bengal sea area.

== Bridges ==
=== India ===
==== Current bridges ====
From east to west till Parashuram Kund, then from southwest to northeast from Parshuram Kund to Patum, finally from east to southwest from Parshuram Kund to Burhidhing:

1. Naranarayan Setu, road and rail bridge near Bongaigaon in Assam, 2,285 metres (7,497 ft)
2. Old Saraighat Bridge, road and rail bridge near Guwahati in Assam. 1,495 metres (4,905 ft)
3. New Saraighat Bridge, road bridge near Guwahati in Assam. 1,521 metres (4,990 ft)
4. Kolia Bhomora Setu, road bridge near Tezpur in Assam, 3,025 metres (9,925 ft)
5. New Kolia Bhomora Bridge, parallel road bridge near the old Kolia Bhomora Setu near Tezpur in Assam .3,065.11 metres (10,056.36 ft)
6. Bogibeel Bridge, road and rail bridge near Dibrugarh in Assam, 4,940 metres (16,210 ft), The Longest on Brahmaputra River.
7. Kumar Bhaskar Varma Setu, 4,050 metres (13,290 ft) in central Guwahati connecting North Guwahati with Guwahati (Pan Bazar and Bharalmukh).
8. Ranaghat Bridge on the Brahmaputra at Pasighat in Arunachal Pradesh. 3,375 metres (11,073 ft)

==== Approved and under-construction bridges ====
9 new bridges, including 3 bridges in Guwahati (New Saraighat bridge parallel to the old bridge, and 2 new bridges in greenfield locations at Bharalumukh and Kurua), 1 new bridge in Tezpur parallel to the old bridge, and 5 greenfield bridges in new locations (Dhubri, Bijoynagar, Gohpur tunnel, Nemtighat, & Sivasagar) elsewhere in Assam have been approved. 5 of these were announced in 2017 by India's Minister for MoRTH, Nitin Gadkari.

From west to east:

1. Dhubri: Dhubri-Phulbari bridge, road and rail bridge in Assam, near tri-junction of east Meghalaya, west Assam and north Bangladesh 12,625 metres (41,421 ft)
2. Bijoynagar: Palasbari-Sualkuchi bridge, to connect Nalbari to Bijoynagar, Guwahati Airport & Shillong.
3. Guwahati: Narangi-Kurua bridge, 675 metres (2,215 ft) east of Guwahati was approved in 2022.
4. Numaligarh-Gohpur Tunnel: under-water tunnel between Gohpur (Biswanath district) and Numaligarh (Golaghat district) in Assam 4,500 metres (14,800 ft) tunnel with 33.7 total length including ramp, Rs6,000 cr DPR was ready in September 2025 and construction will take 5 years after the land acquisition and award of contract.
5. Jorhat-Majuli bridge:
  Jorhat-Majuli bridge at Jorhat on Brahmaputra in Assam The Jorhat-Majuli bridege combined with Louit Khablu Bridge on a tributary will connect Jorhat with Bihpuria and Narayanpur. When completed, it will be about 8.25 km in length.
6. Sivasagar: Disangmukh-Tekeliphuta Bridge between Disangmukh-Tekeliphuta near Sivasagar in Assam 2.8 km

==== Proposed and awaiting approval by MoRTH ====
- Bridges on Brahmaputra:
  These will reduce risk of blockades, logistics cost, travel time, boost economy, and enable India's Look-East and Neighbourhood-first connectivity.
1. Barpeta-Nitarkhola Reserve bridge: half-way between Narnarayan Setu (Jogighopa) and Guwahati bridge, will reduce 140 km distance by 100 km to 40 km, vital for east Assam connectivity to south Assam, Meghalaya, Bangladesh and Tripura.
2. Bhuragaon-Kaupati Bridge: near Morigaon half-way between Guwahati and Tezpur, it will reduce 180 km distance by 140 km to 40 km, vital for connecting Tawang and eastern end of East-West Arunachal Industrial Corridor Highway to South Assam, Tripura, Bangladesh, Manipur, Mizoram and Myanmar (Kaladan Project), all of which are vital for tourism and trade.
3. Sadiya Sille-Oyan bridge, 40 km long road including bridges, from Sille-Oyan-Chilling Madhupur-Sadia over Brahmputra river will existing 180 km Sille-Oyan to Sadiya distance by 140 km and existing 150 km Pasighat-Sadiya distance by 110 km. It is vital for National Waterway 2 and East-West Arunachal Industrial Corridor Highway.
- Bridges on Padma River
1. Dhulian bridge: between Pakur and Malda.
- Bridges on Subansiri River
1. Narayanpur-Majuli Bridge to connect Narayanpur and Bodti Miri to Majuli Bridge. There is existing NH bridge near Gogamukh in north, another under construction Majuli-North Lakhimpur NH bridge in centre, and Narayanpur-Majuli Bridge in south will be third bridge.
- Bridges on Manas and Beki rivers: between Chapar and Barpeta on greenfield expressway
1. Chamabati-Oudubi bridge
2. Barjana-Moinbari bridge
3. Balikuri-Barpeta bridge

==== Under-river tunnel ====
1. Numaligarh-Gohpur under-river tunnel. The 15.6 km long tunnel, 22 metres below the river bed, will have 18 km approach roads to connect the NH-52 and Numaligarh on NH-37. This total ~33 km route will boost economy and strategic defence connectivity, protect Kaziranga National Park by diverting traffic away from the congested 2-lane highway through the park, shorten 223 km 6 hour long Gohpur-Numaligarh route to 35 km and 30 minutes, This twin tube tunnel, with an under road water drainage and overhead ventilation fans, will have inter-connectivity the twin tubs for evacuation. It will be equipped with sensors, CCTV, automated safety and traffic control systems. It will cost Rs 12,807 crore (US$1.7 billion in 2021).

=== Bangladesh ===
==== Present bridges in Bangladesh ====
- Bridges on Brahmaputra (Jamuna River)
1. Bangabandhu Bridge (formerly Jamuna Bridge), road and rail bridge connects Siraiganj and Tangail on either side of the river.
2. Bangabandhu Railway Bridge is under contraction railway bridge over Bramhmaputra River. It is connect Bangabandhu Bridge East Railway Station to Bangabandhu West Railway station
- Bridges on Padma River tributary of Brahmaputra
1. Padma Bridge, road and rail bridge, south of Dhaka.
2. Lalon Shah Bridge road bridge on Padma River tributary of Brahmaputra, near Ishwardi & Pabna.
3. Hardinge Bridge, rail bridge on Padma River next to Lalon Shah Bridge.

==== Planned bridges in Bangladesh ====
- Bridges on Brahmaputra (Jamuna River)
1. Kurigram-Mankachar bridge, rail and road bridge connecting west Meghalaya (Mankachar) and north Bangladesh (Kurigram, Rangpur & Dinajpur) to north West Bengal (Cooch Behar & Siliguri) and Sikkim.
2. Gaibandha-Bakshiganj Bridge, road and rail bridge to connect existing rail and road heads at Gaibandha-Bakshiganj on either side of the river. It will connect southwest Meghalaya (India) & south Assam (Silchar, India) to Bogura (Bangladesh), Malda (India), Bhagalpur (India) as an alternative to the chicken-neck Siliguri Corridor.
3. Bogura-Jamalpur Gaibandha-Bakshiganj Bridge, road and rail bridge to connect Imphal-Silcher to Sylhet-Mymensingh-Bogura to Malda-Gaya-Patna.
4. Shivalya-Golanda-Bhagulpur Bridge, road and rail bridge to connect existing rail and road heads at Siraiganj-Tangail on either side of the river.
5. Chandpur Bridge, rail and road bridge to connect Northeast India (Aizawal-Rikhawdar in Mizoram & Udaipur in Tripura) to Bangladesh (Cumilla-Khulna) and Kolkata.
6. Elisha-Lakshmipur Bridge, rail and road bridge to connect south Mizoram (Lunglei-Talabung) and south Tripura Sabroom to Feni-Barisal-Port of Mongla and Diamond Harbour-Haldia ports.
- Bridges on Padma river
1. Rajshahi bridge

=== Tibet (China) ===
In course of last 64 years, since Tibet became part of China as an Autonomous region, at least 10 Bridges have been built on Brahmaputra River. Currently as per satellite imagery, only 4–5 bridges built on River Brahmaputra have been confirmed. These are as follows as per Google Map Satellite View:-

1. Ziajhulinzhen Bridge, Built in 2009–2012 at 4,350 metres (14,270 ft), this is the Second longest Bridge on Brahmaputra river.
2. Nyingchi Bridge, built in 2014 to connect Nyingchi with Lhasa by railway, this bridge is 750 metres (2,460 ft) long.
3. Lasahe Bridge, built over Lhasa River, this road bridge is 929 metres (3,048 ft) long.
4. Shigatse Bridge, this 2,750 metres (9,020 ft) long bridge built over Yarlung Tsangpo (Brahmaputra) River to connect Lhasa with Shigatse by both road & Rail.
5. Lhatse Bridge, this 2,250 metres (7,380 ft) long bridge built over Yarlung Tsangpo (Brahmaputra) River to connect Kailash-Mansarovar region with Lhasa by Road.
6. Shannan Bridge, this 2,000 metres (6,600 ft) long bridge built over Yarlung Tsangpo (Brahmaputra) River to connect Lhasa with Nyingchi by road.
7. Shangri Bridge, this 1,500 metres (4,900 ft) long bridge built over Yarlung Tsangpo (Brahmaputra) River to connect Lhasa with Nyingchi by road.
8. 3 more Bridges over Yarlung Tsangpo (Brahmaputra) River is in Tibet (China) Autonomous Region, but details are unknown.

== National Waterway 2 in India ==
National Waterway 2 (NW2) is 891 km long Sadiya-Dhubri stretch of Brahmaputra River in Assam.

== Cultural depictions ==
- Namami Brahmaputra Theme Song (in Hindi and Assamese) of Namami Brahmaputra festival.

== See also ==
- BrahMos (missile) – A missile named partly after the Brahmaputra River
- Brahmaputra-class frigate
- Dhola-Sadiya bridge
- List of rivers of Asia
- List of rivers of Assam
- List of rivers of Bangladesh
- List of rivers of China
- List of rivers of India
- Peninsular River System
