= Jogighopa =

- Town
- Location in Assam, India Jogighopa (India)
- Coordinates: 26.23°N 90.58°E
- Country: India
- State: Assam
- District: Bongaigaon
- Elevation: 20 m (66 ft)

Languages
  - Official: Assamese
- Time zone: UTC+5:30 (IST)
- Postal code: 783382
- ISO 3166 code: IN-AS
- Vehicle registration: AS

Jogighopa is a small town located on the northern bank of the Brahmaputra River in the Bongaigaon district in the state of Assam, India.

Within the city, there are the remains of the five rock cut caves which are assumed to be examples of Mlechchha dynasty period architecture. The architectural site is being preserved by the Archaeological Survey of India (ASI).

== Geography ==
Jogighopa is located at 26.23°N 90.58°E. It has an average elevation of 20 m (66 ft). Population: officially Jogighopa is not a Town. It is a Village and still under Jogighopa Gaon Panchayat. But, in the last few years, population of Jogighopa has been growing way faster, A significant aspect of Jogighopa is that it covers some important areas like Kabaitary, Chalantapara, Papermil and Balapara. Nowadays, these areas have become an integral part of Greater Jogighopa Town (Non-official) and this whole area is popularly known as Jogighopa. As per Census data of 2011, total population of Greater Jogighopa is 65845. It is expected that, by 2021, its population may touch the figure of 1,00,000.

== Transport ==
Jogighopa has a combined road-rail bridge, called Naranarayan Setu, over the Brahmaputra River.
