= Kulsi River =

River in India

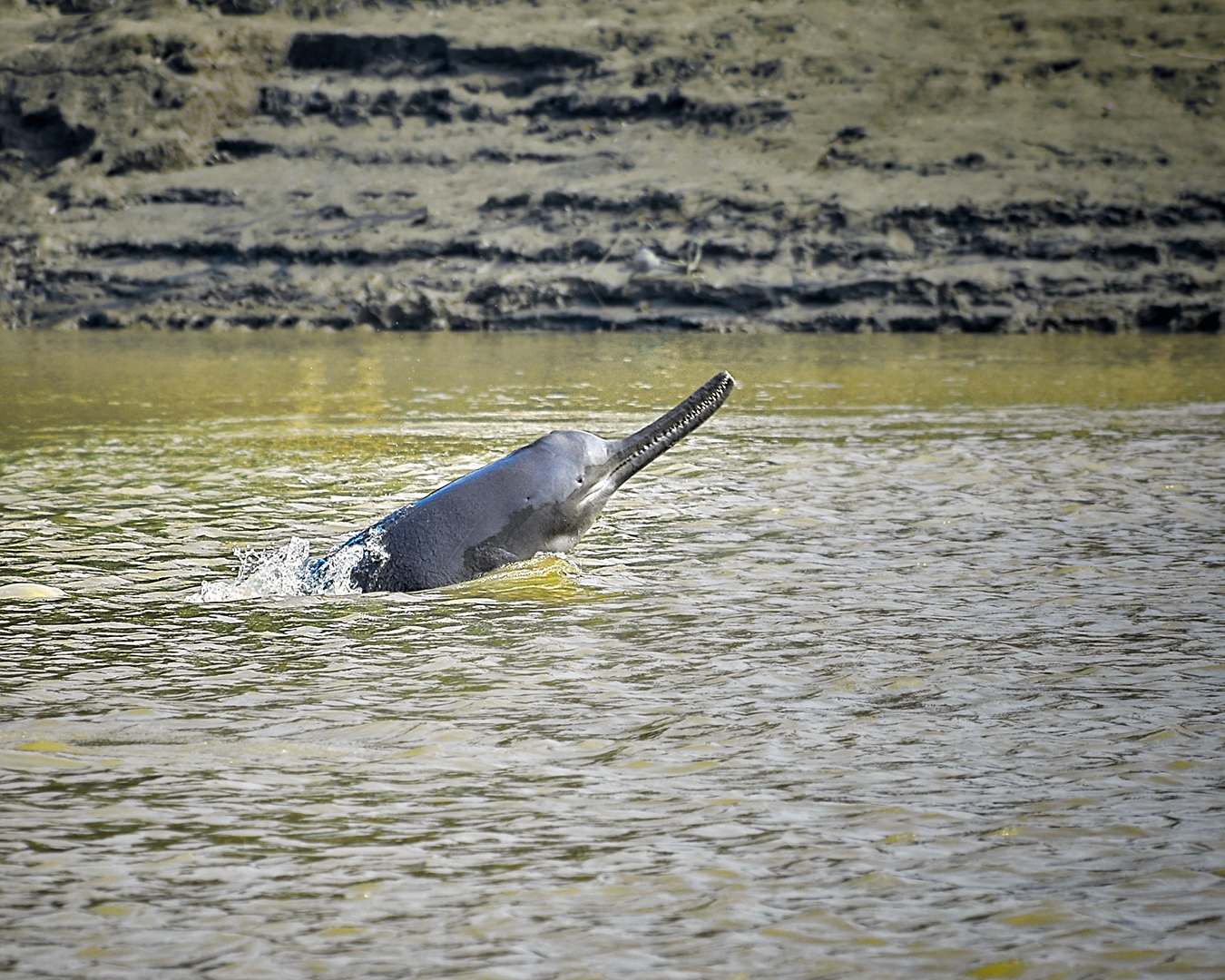
- Kulsi river is a habitat of South Asian river dolphin (Ganges river dolphin)

- Location within Assam Location within India
- Native name: কুলশী নদী (Assamese)

Location
- State: Assam
- District: Kamrup District

Physical characteristics
- Source: West Khasi Hills
  - location: Meghalaya
  - coordinates: 25°33′55.7″N 91°39′34.4″E
- Mouth: Brahmaputra River
  - location: Nagarbera, Kamrup district, Assam
  - coordinates: 26°07′10.4″N 91°00′04.4″E

Basin features
- Progression: Kulsi River - Brahmaputra River

The Kulsi River is a tributary of the Brahmaputra River in the Indian state of Assam. The river originates from West Khasi Hills of Meghalaya. The river is known as Khir River in its origin. After travelling 12 km in Meghalaya, the river then flows through Kamrup district of Assam and is known as Kulsi. The confluence of the Kulsi with Brahmaputra River is at Nagarbera of Kamrup district, Assam.

== Habitat of Dolphin ==
The Kulsi river is the habitat of endangered South Asian river dolphin (Platanista gangetica). This endangered dolphin (known as Xihu in Assamese language) breeds only in the Subansiri and Kulsi rivers across the entire Brahmaputra delta. However, sand mining and other development activities make dolphins in the Kulsi vulnerable and the numbers of this endangered dolphin have sharply declined.
