= New Saraighat Bridge =

New Saraighat Bridge 2nd Saraighat Bridge
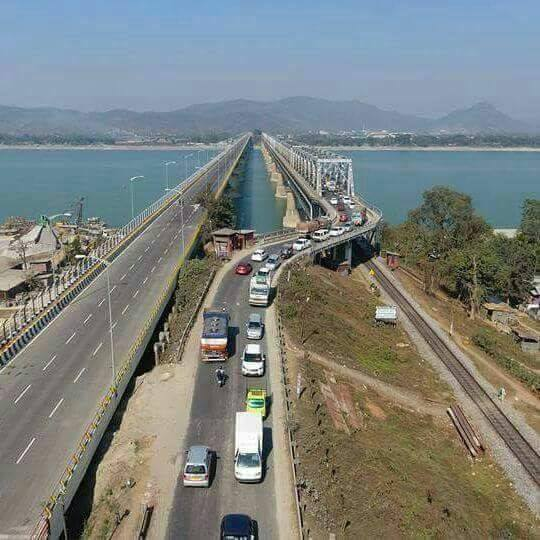
- New Saraighat Bridge (Left) and Saraighat Bridge (right)
- Coordinates: 26°10′31″N 91°40′19″E
- Carries: Motor vehicles
- Crosses: Brahmaputra River
- Locale: Pandu–Amingaon(North Guwahati), Assam, India
- Maintained by: Ministry of Road Transport and Highways

Characteristics
- Design: Beam bridge
- Total length: 1.49 km (0.93 mi)
- Width: 12.9 m (42 ft)

History
- Construction start: 2007
- Construction end: 2016
- Opened: 28 January 2017

Location
- Interactive map of New Saraighat Bridge; 2nd Saraighat Bridge

The New Saraighat Bridge, also referred to as the 2nd Saraighat Bridge is a beam bridge in India that connects the North bank of Assam to the South bank of Assam. The bridge spans the Brahmaputra River and was built besides the Old Saraighat Bridge from Pandu, Guwahati in the south to Amingaon, Guwahati in the north. The construction of the bridge started in 2007. The total length of the bridge is 1,493.58 metres and it had a cost of Rs 475 crore to complete the bridge. It was constructed by India's largest civil engineering company, Gammon India Limited.

The three lane road bridge was inaugurated by Union minister Nitin Gadkari in the presence of Union Minister of State for Railways Rajen Gohain, Minister of Commerce and Industry, Transport and Parliamentary Affairs Chandra Mohan Patowary, Minister of PWD, Fisheries and Excise Parimal Suklabaidya, Minister Keshab Mahanta and many other ministers on 28 January 2017.

== See also ==
- List of bridges on Brahmaputra River
