= Peninsular River System =

River system in India

The Peninsular River System is an Indian River System. It is one of two types of Indian River System, along with the Himalayan River System. The Peninsular River System's major rivers are the Godavari River, Kaveri (or Cauvery), Krishna River, Mahanadi River, Narmada River, and Tapi River (or Tapti).

The rivers mainly drain in the rural area of India. The rivers have both religious and cultural significance to Indian people. The Peninsular Rivers are mostly fed by the rainfall. During the summer, their discharge is significantly less. Some of their confluents indeed get dehydrated, purely to be regenerated in the monsoon. The catchment region of the Godavari River in the peninsula is the biggest in India, covering a territory of around 10% of the whole country.
