= Indian locomotive class WDM-3 =

Class of Diesel–hydraulic locomotive

Type and origin
- Power type: Diesel
- Designer: Henschel
- Builder: Henschel
- Order number: 66/RSF/466/15
- Serial number: 31300–31307
- Model: DHG 2500 BB
- Build date: 1970
- Total produced: 8
Specifications
- Configuration
  - AAR: C-C
  - UIC: Bo-Bo
  - Commonwealth: Bo-Bo
- Gauge: 1,676 mm (5 ft 6 in)
- Wheel diameter: 1,400 mm (4 ft 7 in)
- Wheelbase: 1,092 mm (3 ft 7 in)
  - Engine: 1
- Length
  - Over couplers: 16.234 m (53 ft 3 1/8 in)
  - Over body: 14.8 m (48 ft 6 5/8 in)
- Width: 3.076 m (10 ft 1 1/8 in)
- Height: 4.235 m (13 ft 10 3/4 in)
- Axle load: 19,000 kg (42,000 lb)
- Loco weight: 76,000 kg (168,000 lb)
- Fuel type: Diesel
- Fuel capacity: 3,200 L (700 imp gal; 850 US gal)
- Lubricant cap.: 425 L (93 imp gal; 112 US gal)
- Coolant cap.: 425 L (93 imp gal; 112 US gal)
- Sandbox cap.: 2.5 L (0.55 imp gal; 0.66 US gal)
- Power supply: 110 V DC supply
- Prime mover: MD-108OZ
- RPM
  - RPM idle: 600
  - Maximum RPM: 1,600
- Engine type: V20 diesel
- Aspiration: Turbo-supercharged
- Cylinders: 20
- Transmission: Diesel-hydraulic transmission
- MU working: 2
- Loco brake: Air, Vacuum Hydrostatic braking
- Train brakes: Air, Vacuum
- Air tank cap.: 3,200 L (700 imp gal; 850 US gal) /min
- Compressor: 3,600 L (790 imp gal; 950 US gal) /min
- Exhauster: 14,000 L (3,100 imp gal; 3,700 US gal) /min
Performance figures
- Maximum speed: 120 km/h (75 mph)
- Power output: Max: 2,500 hp (1,900 kW); Site rated: 2,440 hp (1,820 kW)
- Tractive effort
  - Starting: 22.0 t (22 long tons; 24 short tons)
  - 1 hour: 22.0 t (22 long tons; 24 short tons)
  - Continuous: 14.0 t (14 long tons; 15 short tons)
- Factor of adh.: 0.33
Career
- Operators: Indian Railways
- Numbers: 18515-18522
- Locale: SCR
- Delivered: July 1970
- First run: August 1970
- Last run: 1990s
- Retired: 1995
- Withdrawn: 1995
- Scrapped: 1996
- Disposition: All scrapped

The Indian locomotive class WDM-3 was a type of diesel-hydraulic locomotive that was developed by Henschel for Indian Railways in 1962. The model name "WDM-3" stood for broad gauge (W), Diesel (D), Mixed traffic (M) engine, 3rd generation (3). These locomotives were put into service between 1970 and 1971, and a total of eight were built between 1962 and 1970. However, they were decommissioned at Gooty in 1995 and are now retired from service.

These diesel-hydraulic locomotives were not related to the ALCO WDM-3A, despite their similar name.

== History ==
=== Introduction ===
An Indian Railways Mechanical Engineer, Man Mohan Suri developed a new hydro-mechanical transmission for diesel locomotives, which was examined by the National Research and Development Corporation and subsequently patented in India as the "Suri transmission" in 1956-57. In 1962, the Railway Board decided to explore the use of the Suri transmission in high-horsepower locomotives to maximize its benefits. As a result, the Railway Board authorized negotiations with West German firms for the development of 5,000 hp locomotives and with ALCO for 2,600 hp locomotives that were already under manufacture at Diesel Locomotive Works in Varanasi.

=== Selection of locomotives ===
Between 1962 and 1964, the Railway Board deliberated on the procurement and development of Suri transmission in locomotives with varying horsepower, including 5,000 hp, 2,500 hp, and 2,600 hp options. Based on technical assessments at the time, the Board believed that higher horsepower locomotives would provide the greatest benefit due to a better power-to-weight ratio. However, they would only proceed with procurement if prices were reasonable and performance guarantees were adequate.

In September 1964, the Railway Board issued tender inquiries to three West German firms, receiving offers from two firms for 5,000 hp locomotives with two 2,500 hp Maybach engines. In June 1965, the Board appointed a Technical Committee to examine these offers. The Committee was tasked with determining the technical suitability of the 5,000 hp locomotives for Suri transmission development, as well as identifying precautions necessary for ensuring the minimum trouble of 20-cylinder high-speed Maybach engines in Indian working conditions.

In December 1965, the Technical Committee concluded that no economic benefits could be expected from the capital and maintenance costs of 5,000 hp locomotives compared to those of dual-coupled 2,600 WDM-2 locomotives. The Committee also deemed 5,000 hp locomotives unsuitable for adoption as a standard unit due to restrictions imposed by track and bridge conditions, hauling capacity, impracticality of multiple operations, and lack of flexibility.

=== Production ===
In September 1966, a West German locomotive manufacturer solicited offers from two firms. The deadline for submission was extended from 15 September to 28 September. Both firms submitted their offers. The Tender Committee reviewed the offers and found the offer from Henschel to be superior from both technical and financial perspectives. Therefore, the Committee recommended that Henschel's offer be accepted. The Research Design and Standards Organisation of the Railways, after a technical review, also found the offer from the other firm (referred to as "firm B") to be unacceptable. The Committee noted that Henschel's guarantee terms were more comprehensive than those offered by firm B.

Henschel provided quotes for locomotives fitted with Suri and Mekydro transmissions. Although the Suri transmission was slightly more expensive (DM 67,500 per locomotive), the Committee found it to be more efficient, with an efficiency rating of 92% in the final stage compared to Mekydro's maximum efficiency of 80-83%. The Committee estimated that the higher efficiency of the Suri transmission would result in savings on fuel costs. Assuming a locomotive would run about 400 km per day online, and fuel was consumed at a rate of 4 litres per km, the Committee estimated that the annual savings per locomotive would be around Rs. 20,000, even at a 5% higher efficiency rate. Therefore, the Committee recommended that the order be placed for six locomotives fitted with Suri transmission and two locomotives with Mekydro transmission from Henschel. The estimated FOB value of the locomotives was approximately 10.4 DM (valued at 11.02 million DM, or roughly Rs. 2.08 crores). The Railway Board approved the recommendations, and an advance letter of acceptance was issued to Henschel in December 1966.

The contract for the supply of the locomotives was signed with Henschel on 23 June 1967. The firm provided a guarantee that the locomotives would be built per specifications and would operate properly. Henschel also guaranteed the proper functioning of the Suri transmission. The guarantee was valid for 24 months from the dates of commissioning of the locomotives in India or 26 months from the dates of shipment from Germany, or 300,000 km run by each locomotive, whichever event occurred first.

=== Performance of locomotives ===
Eight WDM-3 locomotives arrived in India in the second half of 1970 and were commissioned between August 1970 and May 1971 at Gooty in Southern Railway. The expenditure recorded up to August 1975 towards the cost of these locomotives was Rs. 3.37 crores. These locomotives were primarily used for freight services on the Guntakal Division of Southern Railway until November 1972 when they were introduced on express passenger services.

In July 1971, the Southern Railway Administration reported to the Railway Board that the locomotives had developed defects in the transmission system and converter turbine wheels, leading to failures. The manufacturers made recommendations, and modifications were carried out in the torque converter, turbine blades, and mechanical clutches, which resolved the issues in the system. However, the locomotives' performance remained unsatisfactory, with an average ineffectiveness ranging from 15.5% to 45.3% during the period from the dates of commissioning to the end of April 1973.

In April 1973, the Railway Board called for a detailed report on the locomotives' performance. The WDM-3 locomotives had lower horsepower (less than 2,600 horsepower), lower axle load (76 tonnes against 110 tonnes of WDM-2 locomotives), and lower converter efficiency at low speeds, resulting in hauling smaller loads, 23% less in the up direction and 25% less in the down direction, than WDM-2 locomotives, particularly on steep gradients.

The maintenance costs were higher in the case of WDM-3 locomotives (Rs. 6,851 for cylinder heads) than WDM-2 locomotives (Rs. 2,632 for cylinder heads). The locomotive failure rate was also higher in WDM-3 locomotives (43,379 km. per failure on average during 1971-72 to 1974-75) when compared to WDM-2 locomotives (112,893 km. per failure in the same period). Fuel consumption of WDM-3 locomotives (both Suri and Mekydro transmissions) was approximately 20% more than that of WDM-2 locomotives, and engine damages on the locomotives equipped with Suri transmission required operating these transmissions purely hydraulically.

The various major defects in these locomotive transmissions and engines were brought to the notice of the manufacturers from time to time. The manufacturers advised the Railway Board in November 1973 that it would be necessary to operate these transmissions purely hydraulically. The Railway Board agreed to the modifications being carried out, which involved dumping the Suri transmission and converting it into a simple hydraulic Mekydro transmission. This modification was carried out on all the locomotives fitted with Suri transmission between December 1973 and January 1974.

The Southern Railway Report compared fuel consumption figures between the WDM-2 and WDM-3 locomotives based on litres per thousand gross tonne-km, which is only valid when the trailing loads are similar. However, the largely dissimilar trailing loads of WDM-2 and WDM-3 on this highly graded section rendered the per thousand tonne-km fuel consumption basis irrelevant. In instances where the WDM-3 and WDM-2 locomotives carried similar loads, such as the Brindavan Express between Madras and Bangalore where higher speeds were reached, the WDM-3 locos exhibited a 4% reduction in fuel consumption compared to the WDM-2 locomotives. However, the use of WDM-3 locomotives on passenger trains was limited due to the specific project they were acquired for, which restricted their use to freight traffic. Subsequently, permission for their use in passenger services was obtained, but the unavailability of imported spare parts had already affected the reliability of the locos. As a result, these locomotives were withdrawn from service by 1990.

== Loco shed ==
All eight WDM-3 locomotives were commissioned at the Diesel Loco Shed, Gooty (GY), which falls under the jurisdiction of the Guntakal Railway Division in Andhra Pradesh. At that time, the Southern Railway zone was responsible for the area. Presently, the Guntakal Railway Division falls under the South Coast Railway zone.

== See also ==
- Rail transport in India § History
- List of diesel locomotives of India
- Rail transport in India
- Indian locomotive class WDM-2
