= Namami Brahmaputra =

Namami Brahmaputra Festival
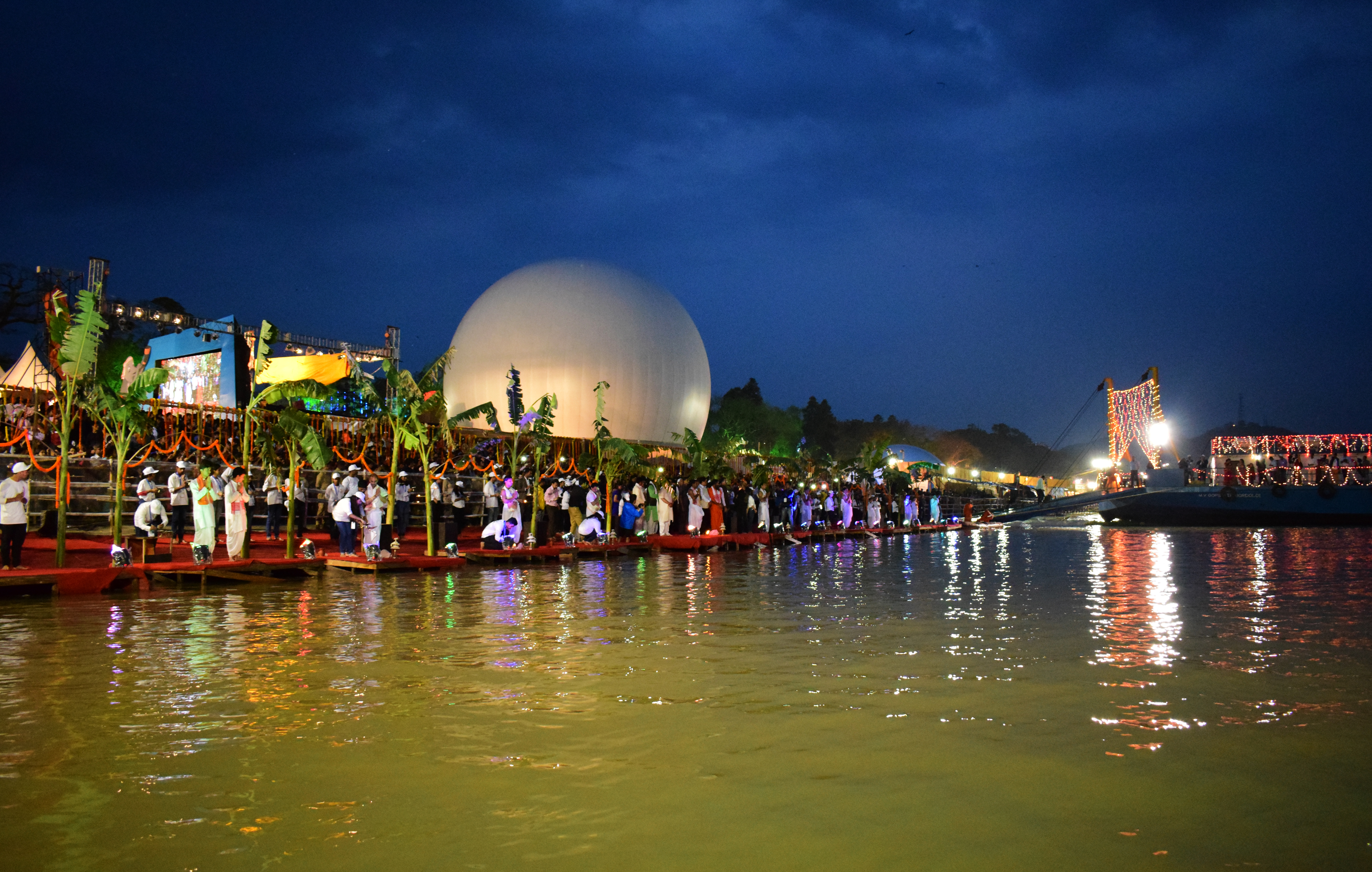
- Native name: নমামি ব্ৰহ্মপুত্ৰ মহোৎসৱ
- Date: 31 March – 4 April 2017
- Venue: 21 districts of assam situated in banks of Brahmaputra River, The main venue of festival is Kachamari Ghat, Guwahati
- Also known as: Namami Brahmaputra; Namami Brahmaputra River Festival
- Type: Fair
- Organised by: Government of Assam
- Participants: Tourists and Locals
- Website: namamibrahmaputra.com

Namami Brahmaputra was an international festival that celebrates the beauty of the Brahmaputra river. It is organised by Assam Government. It was the first international river festival to be held in Assam. It was celebrated from 31 March – 4 April 2017. The then President of India, Shri Pranab Mukherjee, inaugurated the 'Namami Brahmaputra' festival.

The five day programme hosted activities to showcase Assam's art, heritage and culture. The event was held in 21 districts across the state touched by the Brahmaputra.

== Gallery ==
Namami Brahmaputra festival
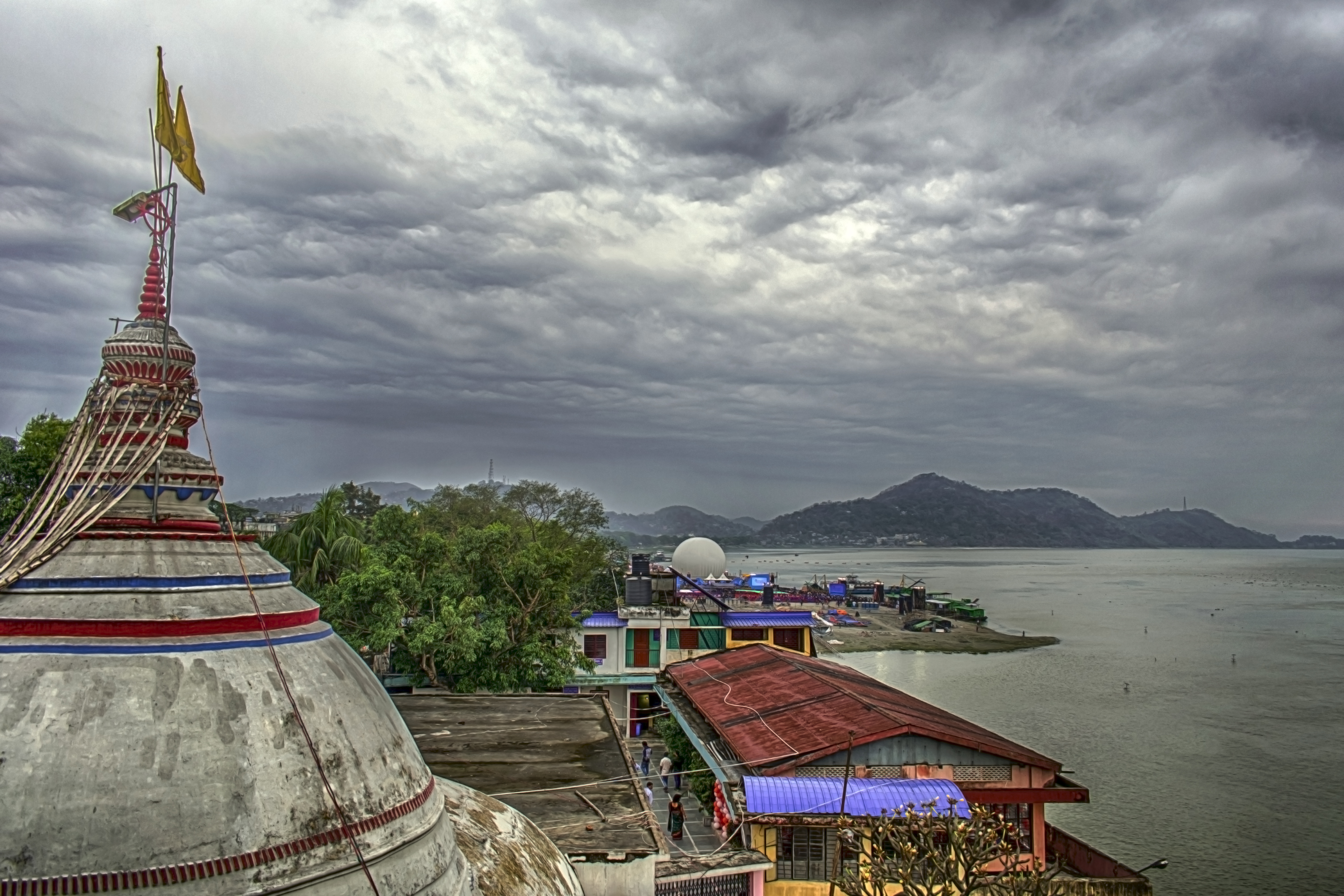
A view of the festival from a nearby point

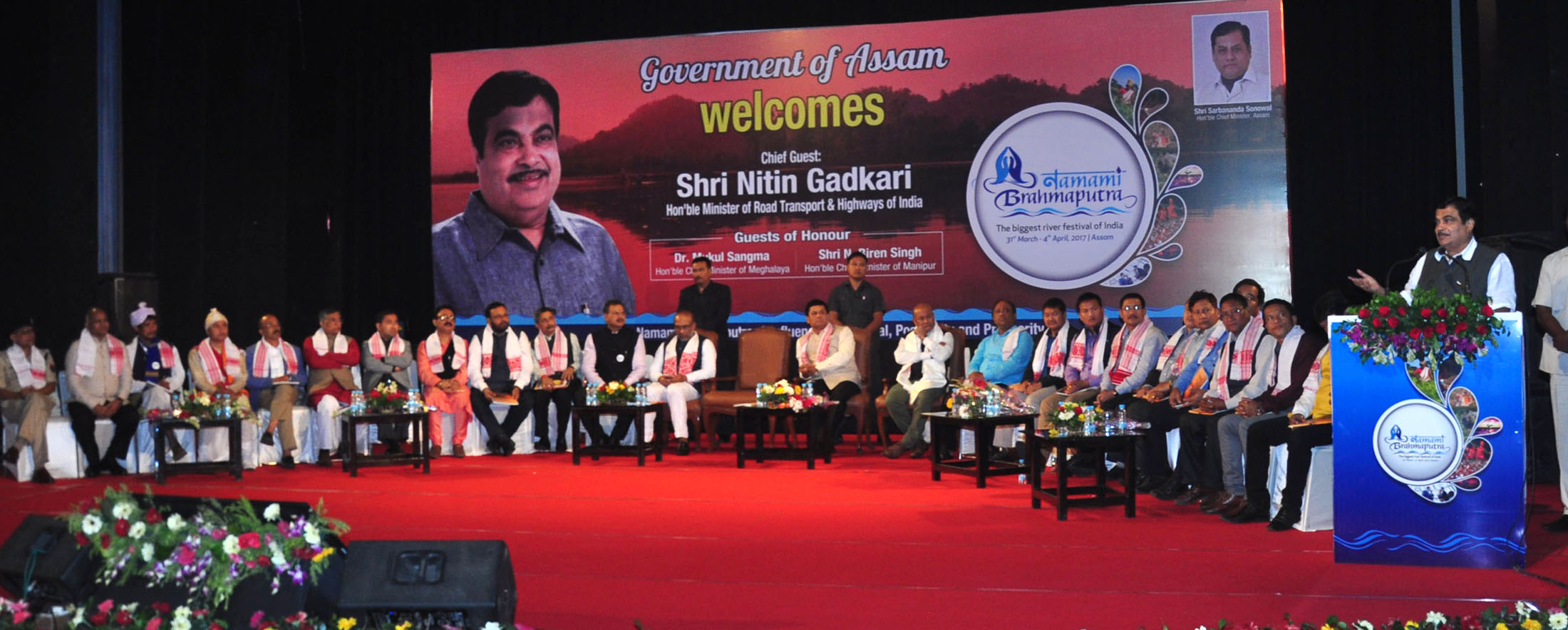
Union Minister Nitin Gadkari addressing at the closing ceremony.
