= Naranarayan Setu =

Bridge in Bongaigaon, Assam, India

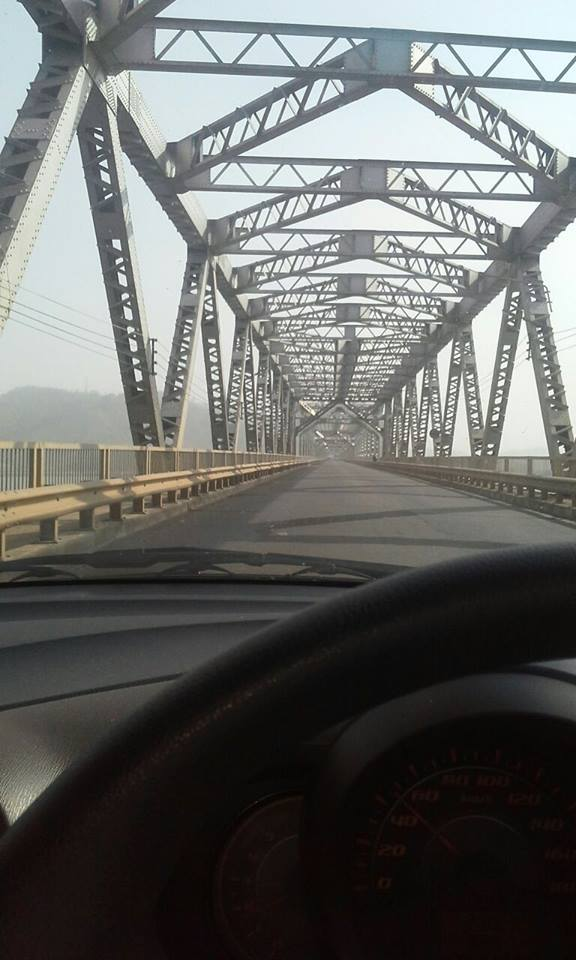
- Naranarayan Setu road deck NH-17
- Coordinates: 26°13′N 90°34′E
- Carries: Road and Railway
- Crosses: Brahmaputra River
- Locale: Jogighopa, Bongaigaon, Assam
- Next upstream: Saraighat Bridge
- Next downstream: Dhubri-Phulbari bridge

Characteristics
- Design: Truss Bridge
- Total length: 2.298 kilometres (1.428 mi)

History
- Engineering design by: Braithwaite, Burn & Jessop Construction Company
- Opened: 15 April 1998

Location
- Interactive map of Naranarayan Setu

Naranarayan Setu (IPA - nərəˈna:ra:jənə ˈseɪtu:) is the third bridge to have been constructed over the Brahmaputra River in Assam, India. It is a double-deck bridge with a double railway track (doubling recently done) on the lower deck and a 2 lane road on the upper deck. It has a length of 2.284 kilometres and connects Jogighopa, a town of Bongaigaon District on the north with Pancharatna, a town of Goalpara District on the south. The bridge was inaugurated on 15 April 1998 by Atal Bihari Vajpayee, the Prime Minister of India at that time. Construction was carried out by the consortium of The Braithwaite Burn and Jessop Construction Company Limited(BBJ). The approximate cost of construction of this bridge is Rs. 301 crore(Current value Rs. 15050 Crore). This bridge is located on route of National Highway 17, erstwhile route NH-37.

== Naming ==
The Naranarayan Setu is named after Nara Narayan, a 16th-century Koch(Coochbehar) king.

== See also ==
- List of bridges on Brahmaputra River
- Godavari Bridge
- Saraighat Bridge
- List of longest bridges in the world
- List of longest bridges above water in India
