= Malda, Bihar =

Malda
- Village
- Location within Bihar
- Coordinates: 27.108°N 84.464°E
- Country: India
- State: Bihar
- District: West Champaran district

Languages
  - Official: Hindi
- Time zone: UTC+5:30 (IST)
- ISO 3166 code: IN-BR

Malda is a village in West Champaran district in the Indian state of Bihar.

== Demographics ==
As of the 2011 census of India, Malda had a population of 1367 in 243 households. Males constitute 52.81% of the population and females 47.18%. Malda has an average literacy rate of 53.84%, lower than the national average of 74%: male literacy is 63.31%, and female literacy is 36.68%. In Malda, 21.2% of the population is under 6 years of age.
