= New Mal–Changrabandha–New Cooch Behar line =

Rail transport in West Bengal

Overview
- Status: Operational
- Owner: Indian Railways
- Locale: West Bengal, Assam
- Termini: New Mal; Changrabandha, New Cooch Behar
- Stations: 15

Service
- System: Single Line Diesel
- Operator(s): 1894–1941 Bengal Dooars Railway; 1941–1942 Eastern Bengal Railway; 1942–1947 Bengal and Assam Railway; 1947–1952 Assam Railway; 1952–1958 North Eastern Railway; 1958–present Northeast Frontier Railway

History
- Opened: 15 January 1893(MG) (Malbazar–Changrabandha section), 11 June 1893(MG) (Lataguri–Ramshai branch line), 20 January 2016 (BG) (Malbazar–Changrabandha section), 21 February 2016 (BG) (Changrabandha–New Cooch Behar section),
- Closed: 2002 (MG) (Malbazar–Changrabandha section), Lataguri–Ramshai branch line is dismantled

Technical
- Line length: 126.8 km (79 mi)
- Track gauge: 1,676 mm (5 ft 6 in) broad Gauge
- Old gauge: 1,000 mm (3 ft 3 3/8 in) (Malbazar–Changrabandha section)

The New Mal–Changrabandha–New Cooch Behar line are a set of 2 lines which connect Changrabandha, a border transit point near Indo-Bangladesh border in Cooch Behar district with the stations of New Mal in Jalpaiguri district and New Cooch Behar in Cooch Behar district of West Bengal. It is under the jurisdiction of Northeast Frontier Railway. The Malbazar–Changrabandha section of the line was a metre-gauge line, before its gauge conversion began on 2002. The Malbazar–Changrabandha section was re-opened to public on 20 January 2016 after gauge conversion. The New Changrabandha–New Cooch Behar broad-gauge line was built as an extension as a part of the New Maynaguri–Jogighopa rail line to provide an alternate link from North Bengal to Assam and was opened to public on 21 February 2016.

== Railway Stations ==
- New Mal Junction
- Malbazar
- Baradighi
- Neora Naddi
- Lataguri
- Domohani
- Jalpaiguri Road railway station
- Maynaguri Road
- Bhotepati
- New Changrabandha
- Changrabandha
- Jamaldah-Gopalpur
- "Nayarhat".
- Mathabhanga
- "Chapaguri".
- New Cooch Behar

== History ==
=== Bengal Dooars Railway ===
The Bengal Dooars Railway company built several metre-gauge lines in the area. It started its main line to open up the Western Dooars and for the development of the tea industry in the region. The main line extended from the then Barnes Ghat (near present-day Maynaguri Road station) in the eastern bank of the Teesta River to Dam Dim via Mal Junction and was opened for service on 15 January 1893.

The Lataguri–Ramshai branch line was opened to serve the Ramshai tea garden near the western bank of the Jaldhaka river on 11 June 1893.

The main line was further extended south, first from Barnes Junction to Baura (20 April 1900) and then from Baura to Bhotmari (21 October 1900) and finally from Bhotmari it was connected to Lalmonirhat junction of the Eastern Bengal Railway on 20 November 1900.

On 1941 Bengal Dooars railway was amalgamated with Eastern Bengal Railway which was further merged with Assam Bengal Railway to form Bengal & Assam Railway on 1942. They remained the operators until partition of India in 1947.

=== Post-Partition ===
Following the partition of India in 1947, the link to Lalmonirhat junction was lost as the line ended at Changrabandha on the Indian side. The rest of the line from Burimari till Lalmonirhat junction fell on the East Pakistan side.

Metre-gauge services continued from Siliguri junction to Changrabandha till gauge conversion of the New Jalpaiguri–Alipurduar–Samuktala Road line isolated the Malbazar–Changrabandha section as the only MG line in the area.

=== Gauge conversion ===
The 62.7 kilometres (39.0 mi) long Malbazar–Changrabandha railway section was converted to 1,676 mm (5 ft 6 in) broad gauge, work for which began on 2002. The line was thrown open to public on 20 January 2016 and a new passenger train was started between Siliguri Jn and Changrabandha. The old MG branch line towards Ramshai was not converted and was dismantled.

== New Assam link ==
To provide a 3rd new link between North Bengal & Assam, the 324 kilometres (201 mi) New Maynaguri–Jogighopa line project was included in the railway budget of 2000–01. The work on the line was divided into the following sections:

- 62.7 kilometres (39.0 mi) long New Mal–Changrabandha section (Gauge conversion completed and opened for service on 20 January 2016)
- New Maynaguri/New Domohani–Maynaguri Road–Jalpaiguri Road Y connection (Jalpaiguri Road–Maynaguri Road section is completed. Work is under progress on New Maynaguri/New Domohani–Maynaguri Road section as of August 2018)
- 64.1 kilometres (39.8 mi) long New Changrabandha–New Cooch Behar new line (work completed & opened for service on 21 February 2016)
- 57.6 kilometres (35.8 mi) long New Cooch Behar–Golokganj new line (work completed & opened for service on 11 February 2012)
- 28.8 kilometres (17.9 mi) long Fakiragram–Dhubri branch line gauge conversion including the line between Golokganj & Gauripur (Opened for service on 13 September 2010)
- 99 kilometres (62 mi) long Gauripur–Abhayapuri (Jogighopa) new line (Line from Gauripur till Alamganj is completed. Rest is work under progress as of August 2018).
