= New Domohani railway station =

Railway station in West Bengal

New Domohani

General information
- Location: Station Halt, Domohani, Jalpaiguri, West Bengal, India; India
- Coordinates: 26.5695°N 88.7858°E
- Elevation: 84 metres (276 ft)
- System: Indian Railways junction station
- Owner: Indian Railways
- Operator: Northeast Frontier Railway
- Line: New Jalpaiguri–New Bongaigaon section
- Platforms: 2
- Tracks: 5

Construction
- Structure type: At grade
- Parking: Available

Other information
- Station code: NQH
- Zone(s): NFR
- Division(s): Alipurduar

History
- Former names: North Bengal State Railway

Passengers
- approx 2,538,009 passengers per year

Services
Preceding station	Indian Railways	Following station
Jalpaiguri Road towards ?	Northeast Frontier Railway zone New Jalpaiguri–New Bongaigaon section	New Maynaguri Junction towards ?
Location
- Location within West Bengal

New Domohani railway station (Station code:NQH) is a railway junction station which serves Domohani, and lies along the bank of River Teesta, the other station is Domohani railway station (station code DOI) which lies in New Mal–Changrabandha–New Cooch Behar line in Jalpaiguri district in the Indian state of West Bengal. New Domohani station lies in New Jalpaiguri–New Bongaigaon section of Barauni–Guwahati line of Northeast Frontier Railway in Alipurduar railway division.

== History ==
The old Domohani railway station which is situated around 2 km northwest of the new station was the Jalpaiguri headquarters of the erstwhile Bengal Dooars Railway, which was functional from 1891 to 1941. This important station was the centre for the railway timber industry which was fed by the forests of Lataguri. Wooden railway sleepers laid all over the subcontinent was shipped from north Bengal originating from this railway head. Freight and passenger services connected this station with other regions in Bengal Duars and the rest of eastern Bengal, with the headquarters at Lalmonirhat, now in Bangladesh thus giving it access to the Calcutta main route. Located on the eastern bank of the Teesta, timber was loaded and assembled here from throughout Bengal Dooars and ferried across the Teesta to Jalpaiguri near present-day Paharpur More and from Jalpaiguri it was transported to the Calcutta mainline. Now dried of its economic potential in the Indian nation state, this once bustling railway station is now defunct.

Construction of the 265 km (165 mi)-long 5 ft 6 in (1,676 mm) broad gauge Siliguri–Jogihopa line, between 1963 and 1965, created broad-gauge railway links in North Bengal and Assam.

== Accident ==
On 13 January 2022, Thursday, train number 15633 Bikaner–Guwahati Express, travelling from Bikaner Junction to Guwahati railway station got derailed between New Domohani and New Maynaguri railway station near Siliguri in West Bengal at around 4:30pm.
