= New Maynaguri railway station =

Railway station in West Bengal, India

New Maynaguri Junction
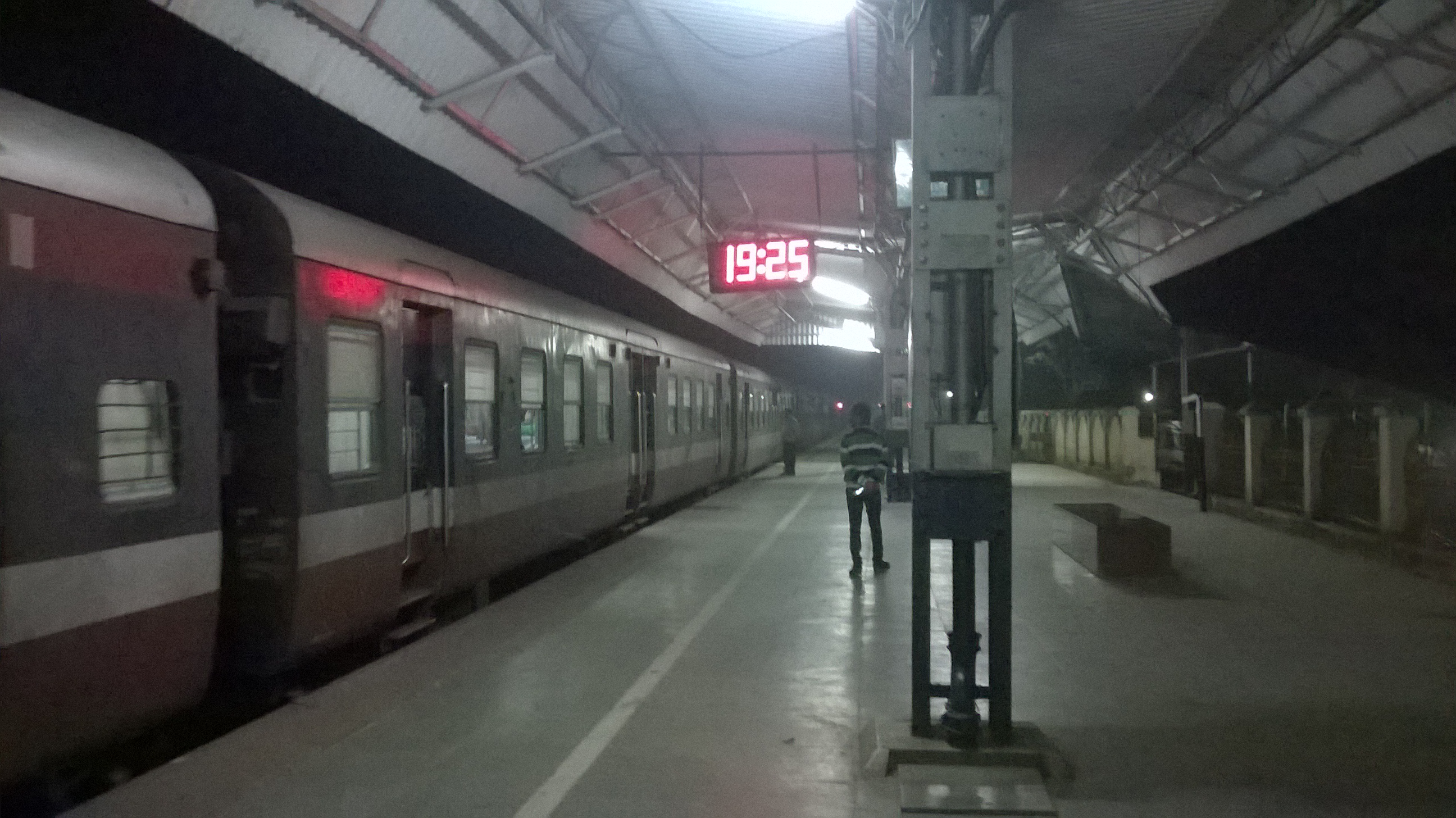
- One of the platforms of New Maynaguri Junction railway station

General information
- Location: Station Road, Maynaguri, Jalpaiguri district, West Bengal; India
- Coordinates: 26.5784°N 88.8228°E
- Elevation: 86 metres (282 ft)
- System: Indian Railways junction station
- Owner: Indian Railways
- Operator: Northeast Frontier Railway
- Lines: New Jalpaiguri–New Bongaigaon section; Barauni–Guwahati line; New Mal–Changrabandha–New Cooch Behar line; New Maynaguri–Jogighopa line
- Platforms: 3

Construction
- Structure type: At grade
- Parking: Available

Other information
- Station code: NMX
- Zone(s): NFR
- Division(s): Alipurduar

Services
Preceding station	Indian Railways	Following station
New Domohani towards ?	Northeast Frontier Railway zone New Jalpaiguri–New Bongaigaon section	Betgara towards ?
Location
- Location within West Bengal Location within India

New Maynaguri railway station is one of two railway stations which serve Mainaguri in the Jalpaiguri district of West Bengal, the other being Maynaguri Road Railway Station. The station lies on the New Mal–Changrabandha–New Cooch Behar line and New Jalpaiguri–New Bongaigaon section of Barauni–Guwahati line of Northeast Frontier Railway. The station lies on Alipurduar railway division.

== Trains ==
Major trains:

- Chennai Tambaram - Silghat Town Nagaon Express
- Sealdah–Agartala Kanchenjunga Express
- Sealdah–Silchar Kanchenjunga Express
- Dibrugarh-Howrah Kamrup Express via Guwahati
- Dibrugarh–Howrah Kamrup Express Via Rangapara North
- Sealdah-New Alipurdiar Teesta Torsha Express
- Delhi-Dibrugarh Brahmaputra Mail
- Sealdah-Bamanhat Uttar Banga Express
- New Jalpaiguri - Bongaigaon Express

== Accident ==
On 13 th January 2022, Thursday, train number 15633 Bikaner–Guwahati Express, travelling from Bikaner Junction to Guwahati railway station got derailed between New Damohani and New Maynaguri railway station near Siliguri in West Bengal at around 4:30pm in the evening.

== The railway station ==
New Maynaguri railway station is at an elevation of 86 metres (282 ft) and was assigned the code NMX.

== History ==
Construction of the 265 km (165 mi)-long 5 ft 6 in (1,676 mm) broad gauge Siliguri–Jogihopa line, between 1963 and 1965, created broad-gauge railway links in North Bengal and Assam.
