= Golokganj railway station =

Railway station in Assam, India

Golakganj railway station

General information
- Location: Golakganj, District: Dhubri, Assam; India
- Coordinates: 26°06′30″N 89°49′51″E
- Elevation: 31 metres (102 ft)
- System: Indian Railways junction station
- Owner: Indian Railways
- Operator: Northeast Frontier Railway
- Lines: Fakiragram–Dhubri branch line New Cooch Behar–Golakganj branch line.
- Platforms: 2
- Tracks: 3

Construction
- Structure type: At grade
- Parking: yes
- Cycle facilities: Yes

Other information
- Status: Functioning
- Station code: GKJ
- Zone(s): Northeast Frontier Railway
- Division(s): Alipurduar

History
- Opened: 1900–1910?
- Former names: Eastern Bengal Railway
Location
- Location within Assam Location within India

Golakganj is a railway junction station on the Fakiragram–Dhubri branch line and the New Cooch Behar–Golakganj branch line. It is located in Dhubri district in the Indian state of Assam. This station serves the Golakganj town. Important trains like Kolkata–Sairang Express, Alipurduar–Silghat Town Rajya Rani Express, Siliguri–Dhubri Intercity Express, are available from this station.

== Geography ==
Places in the south-eastern portion of Dinhata subdivision in Cooch Behar district, western part of Dhubri district, northern part of Kurigram district and northern part of Lalmonirhat district, all linked with development of railways in the area
CT: census town, R: rural/ urban centre, RS: railway station
Owing to space constraints in the small map, the actual locations in a larger map may vary slightly

Dhubri district occupies the south-west corner of Assam. It borders on Bangladesh, and the Indian states of West Bengal and Meghalaya. The Brahmaputra divides the district into two parts. Tributaries of the Brahmaputra such as Gangadhar, Gaurang, Tipkai, Champaboti in the north and Jinjiram, Jinari and Kaloo in the south are all major contributors of floods in the area. Golakganj is situated 184 kilometres (114 mi) from New Jalpaiguri, 85.25 kilometres (52.97 mi) from New Bongaigaon, 58.5 kilometres (36.4 mi) from New Cooch Behar & 265 kilometres (165 mi) from Guwahati

== History ==
In pre-independence days (in the early 1900s), Golakganj was the main route falling 1,000 mm (3 ft 3 3/8 in)-wide metre-gauge line: Katihar–Radhikapur–Biral–Parbatipur–Tista–Gitaldaha–Golakganj–Fakiragram. The Assam Mail used to run on this route. But with the partition of India in 1947, railways in Assam got delinked from that of the rest of India. Indian Railway took up the Assam Link Project in 1948 to build a metre-gauge rail link between Fakiragram and Kishanganj. Assam was connected to the Indian railway system in 1950. In the mid-1960s, the first 5 ft 6 in (1,676 mm) broad gauge line was laid in the area from New Jalpaiguri to New Bongaigaon . The Fakirgram–Golakganj-Dhubri line was opened in September 2010 after conversion to broad gauge.

Up to the sixties there was a railway link from Cooch Behar to Dhubri via Golakganj. It was then known as the Assam Line Railway Service. It also connected East Pakistan, even after partition. However, collapse of the rail-cum-road bridge over the Gadadhar in the seventies ended that link. The line became operable in 2012 after the bridge was rebuilt and the track laid again as broad gauge, entirely through Indian territory. Dhubri–New Jalpaiguri Inter-city Express via New Cooch Behar was introduced in February 2012. The Gauripur - Abhayapuri line was completed in 2024 and now acts as an alternate line from New Jalpaiguri to Guwahati via New Cooch Behar and Tufanganj avoiding New Bongaigaon.

Note: The map alongside presents the position as it stands today (2020). The international border was not there when the railways were first laid in the area in the 19th–20th century. It came up in 1947. Since then, it has been an effort to live up to the new realities. The map is 'Interactive' (the larger version) – it means that all the places shown in the map are linked in the full screen map.

| Preceding station | Indian Railways | Following station |
|---|---|---|
| Moterjhar towards ? | Northeast Frontier Railway zone Fakiragram–Dhubri branch line | Gauripur towards ? |
| Terminus | Northeast Frontier Railway zone New Cooch Behar–Golokganj branch line | Agomoni towards ? |
