= New Changrabandha railway station =

Railway station in West Bengal, India

New Changrabandha

General information
- Location: Railway Station Rd, SH 12A, Kamat Chandrabandha, Cooch Behar district, 735301, West Bengal; India
- Coordinates: 26°26′14″N 88°54′11″E
- System: Indian Railways station
- Owner: Indian Railways
- Operator: Northeast Frontier Railway
- Line: New Mal–Changrabandha–New Cooch Behar line
- Platforms: 1
- Tracks: 2

Construction
- Structure type: At grade
- Parking: Yes

Other information
- Status: Functioning
- Station code: NCBD
- Zone(s): Northeast Frontier Railway
- Division(s): Alipurduar

History
- Former names: Bengal Dooars Railway
Location
- Location within West Bengal Location within India

New Changrabandha station code NCBD is a railway station serving the town of Changrabandha along with Changrabandha railway station station code CBD in Mekhliganj CD block, Cooch Behar district in the Indian state of West Bengal.

== Trains ==
Sealdah – New Alipurduar Padatik Superfast Express along with some local trains like Siliguri–Bamanhat DEMU, Siliguri–New Bongaigaon DEMU, Siliguri–Dhubri DEMU etc. runs from New Changrabandha railway station on daily basis.
