= Jorai =

- Suburb
- Location in West Bengal, India
- Coordinates: 26.4561°N 89.8048°E
- Country: India
- State: West Bengal
- District: Coochbehar

Government
  - Body: Gram Panchayat

Languages
  - Official: Bengali, English
- Time zone: UTC+5:30 (IST)
- PIN: 736207
- Telephone code: 03564
- Vehicle registration: WB64
- Nearest city: Alipurduar
- Lok Sabha constituency: Alipurduar
- Civic agency: Gram Panchayat
- Climate: Tropical humid (Köppen)

Jorai is a village of Cooch Behar, West Bengal. (Elevation: 53 m above sea level, Zone: NFR/Northeast Frontier). Jorai (jo'-ra-i) is of Hebrew origin and has many possible meanings. It could mean "whom Jehovah teaches," or the name of a Gadite chief (dwelling at Gilead in Bashan, in the reign of Jothan king of Judah), or possibly the name of a clan (1 Ch 5:13). However, in this case, the name is derived from a rivulet called Jorai Nodi – a tributary of the River Sankosh .

Jorai features a railway station by the same name (there are three railway stations, Kamakhyaguri Railway Station, (KAMG), Jorai Railway Station (JOQ) and Srirampur (SRPB), which belong to three separate districts, Alipurduar, Coochbehar (both in West Bengal) and Kokrajhar (in Assam), respectively).

== Major localities ==
Jorai Bazaar, Aastami Ghat অষ্টমী ঘাট, Jorai High School (H.S.), Jorai Railway Station, Naothowa নাওথোয়া, Paschim Rampur পশ্চিম রামপুর, Dakshin Rampur দক্ষিন রামপুর, Aashor Para আসরপাড়া, Wilson Road, Uttar Rampur উত্তর রামপুর, Madhya Rampur মধ্যরামপুর, Najirandeutikhata নাজিরান দেউতিখাতা, and Chhat Valka ছাটভল্কা.Kathaltola

== Transport ==
Jorai Railway Station (Station code:JOQ) serves the areas of Jorai. This railway station lies on New Jalpaiguri–New Bongaigaon section of Barauni–Guwahati line of Northeast Frontier Railway, Alipurduar railway division.

== Occupations ==
Most of the people rely on agriculture. Businesses such as timber, fishing, retail clothing, and shops are also common here. Assam-Bengal Commercial/Sales Tax office used to provide a large number of jobs. But post GST regime, Jorai and it's neighbour Barobisha have witnessed massive unemployment due to the unification in taxes and abolishing of State sales Tax gate, which would otherwise serve many people a source of income. Computer learning centers and railways provide other job opportunities. Jorai's connectivity with other parts has been hampered recently, after the North Bengal State Transport Corporation's bus terminus shifted from here to Alipurduar.

== Cultural activities ==
Cultural activities started with the emergence of "Jatra" culture which was initially patronized by the late Sukumar Ghosh সুকুমার ঘোষ, the founder of Jorai Madan-mohan Bari মদনমোহন বাড়ী (the place for community worship and fare). Aashor para drama club (এনাদের "সব পেয়েছির আসর" একসময় বেশ বিখ্যাত ছিল), Pragati Sangha, Danpiter ashor ডানপিটের আসর, Kishore Sangha, North Bengal State Transport employees (এনাদের বিশ্বকর্মা পুজো একসময় বেশ বিখ্যাত ছিল) and Jorai Railways employees geared up the cultural activities further in the 1980s and 1990s.

== Sports ==
The marathon oneday knockout football tournaments held every year witnesses a massive upsurge of spectators around its neighborhood area. However, with the advent of cricket in the 1990s, the football craze has been reduced considerably.

== Other Jorai towns ==
- There is a town named Jorai in the North West Frontier Province, Pakistan (latitude: 34.87324 and longitude: 72.88318).
- There is a town named Jorai in Madhya Pradesh, India (latitude: 25.42779 and longitude: 77.74414).
- Boirali maach (বৈরালী মাছ): The rare fishes of Himalayan foothills – Danio rerio, Danio dangila and Barilius Barila are available in Raidak, Jorai and Sankosh river. Boirali fish derives its nutrition from microscopic Dufnia, Cyclop or from green algae Spirogyra or Volvox. These fishes are nowadays facing the crisis of extinction due to water pollution, excess use of pesticides and the frequent vibration caused by dynamite explosions in the hills. (Web page developed by Sudipto Ghosh)
