= Domohani railway station =

Railway station in West Bengal, India

Domohani Railway Station (Code: DOI)

General information
- Location: Malbazar - Maynaguri road ( NH - 31), Domohoni, P.s. - Maynaguri, Dist - Jalpaiguri State: West Bengal; India
- Coordinates: 26.5795°N 88.7697°E
- Elevation: 90 metres (300 ft)
- System: Indian Railways Station
- Owner: Indian Railways
- Operator: Northeast Frontier Railway zone
- Line: New Mal–Changrabandha–New Cooch Behar line
- Platforms: 2
- Tracks: 3 (broad gauge)

Construction
- Parking: Available

Other information
- Status: Functioning
- Station code: DOI
- Zone(s): Northeast Frontier Railway zone
- Division(s): Alipurduar
Location
- Location within West Bengal Location within India

Domohani Railway Station is the railway station which lies on the bank of River Teesta and serves the town of Domohani, the other station is New Domohani which lies in New Jalpaiguri–New Bongaigaon section of Barauni–Guwahati line. This station lies in Jalpaiguri district in the Indian state of West Bengal. The station lies on New Mal–Changrabandha–New Cooch Behar line of Northeast Frontier Railway, Alipurduar railway division. Some local trains like Siliguri Bamanhat DEMU, Siliguri New Bongaigaon DEMU, Siliguri Dhubri DEMU etc are available from this station daily.
