= Mathabhanga =

- City
- Location in West Bengal, India Mathabhanga (India) Mathabhanga (Asia)
- Coordinates: 26.33°N 89.22°E
- Country: India
- State: West Bengal
- District: Cooch Behar

Government
  - Type: Municipality
  - Body: Mathabhanga Municipality

Area
  - Total: 3.71 km^{2} (1.43 sq mi)
- Elevation: 50 m (160 ft)

Population (2011)
  - Total: 23,890
  - Density: 6,440/km^{2} (16,700/sq mi)

Languages
  - Official: Bengali
  - Additional official: English
- Time zone: UTC+5:30 (IST)
- PIN: 736146
- Telephone code: 03583
- Lok Sabha constituency: Cooch Behar (SC)
- Vidhan Sabha constituency: Mathabhanga (SC)
- Website: coochbehar.nic.in

Mathabhanga (Bengali pronunciation: [matʰabʱaŋa]), is a city along Jaldhaka River and a municipality in Cooch Behar district in the Indian state of West Bengal. It is the headquarters of the Mathabhanga subdivision.

== Etymology ==
The term "Mathabhanga" etymologically means "broken head".

== Geography ==
Places in the Mathabhanga, Mekhliganj subdivisions and Sitai CD block in Dinhata subdivision of Cooch Behar district
CT: census town, R: rural/ urban centre, M: Municipal town
Owing to space constraints in the small map, the actual locations in a larger map may vary slightly

=== Location ===
Mathabhanga is located at 26.33°N 89.22°E. It has an average elevation of 50 m (160 ft). There are two rivers near Mathabhanga. One is Satranga (Sutunga) and the other is Mansai. On a clear day, the Himalayan range is visible from the city.

According to the District Census Handbook 2011, Koch Bihar, Mathabhanga covered an area of 3.71 km^{2}.

=== Area overview ===
The map alongside shows the western part of the district. In Mekhliganj subdivision 9.91% of the population lives in the urban areas and 90.09% lives in the rural areas. In Mathabhanga subdivision 3.67% of the population, the lowest in the district, lives in the urban areas and 96.35% lives in the rural areas. The entire district forms the flat alluvial flood plains of mighty rivers.

Note: The map alongside presents some of the notable locations in the subdivisions. All places marked in the map are linked in the larger full screen map.

== Demographics ==
As per 2011 Census of India Mathabhanga had a total population of 23,890 of which 12,059 (50%) were males and 11,831 (50%) were females. Population in the age range 0–6 years was 2,165. The total number of literate persons in Mathabhanga was 19,571 (90.09% of the population over 6 years).

As of 2001 India census, Mathabhanga had a population of 21,110. Males constitute 51% of the population and females 49%. Mathabhanga has an average literacy rate of 76%, higher than the national average of 59.5%: male literacy is 81%, and female literacy is 71%. In Mathabhanga, 11% of the population is under 6 years of age.

== Civic administration ==
=== Police station ===
Mathabhanga police station has jurisdiction over Mathabhanga municipal area and Mathabhanga I CD block.

== Transport ==
The Mathabhanga Railway Station lies on the New Mal-Changrabandha-New Cooch Behar line.

== Education ==
- Mathabhanga College was established in 1969 at Mathabhanga. Affiliated with the Cooch Behar Panchanan Barma University, it offers honours courses in Bengali, English, Sanskrit, political science, history, geography, philosophy, economics, physics, chemistry, mathematics and accounting and general courses in arts, science and commerce.
- Mathabhanga Government Polytechnic was established in 2019.Affiliated with the West Bengal State Council of Technical Education. This college offers Diploma in Engineering & Technology courses(10+3) in Packaging Technology, Electronics & Telecommunication Engineering and Electrical Engineering.

== Healthcare ==
Mathabhanga Subdivisional Hospital at Mathabhanga functions with 120 beds.
