= Fakiragram Junction railway station =

Railway station in Assam

Fakiragram Junction

General information
- Location: Fakiragram, Kokrajhar, Assam; India
- Coordinates: 26°21′53″N 90°11′11″E
- Elevation: 43 metres (141 ft)
- System: Indian Railways station Junction station
- Owner: Indian Railways
- Operator: Northeast Frontier Railway
- Lines: New Jalpaiguri–New Bongaigaon section of Barauni–Guwahati line Fakiragram–Golokganj–Dhubri branch line
- Platforms: 5

Construction
- Structure type: At grade
- Parking: yes
- Cycle facilities: No

Other information
- Status: Functioning
- Station code: FKM
- Zone(s): Northeast Frontier Railway
- Division(s): Alipurduar

History
- Opened: 1900–1910
- Former names: Eastern Bengal Railway
Location
- Location within Assam Location within India

Fakiragram is a railway station on the New Jalpaiguri–New Bongaigaon section of Barauni–Guwahati line and is located in Kokrajhar district in the Indian state of Assam. A branch line from Fakiragram connects to Dhubri.

== Trains ==
Major Trains:

- Guwahati - Sir M. Visvesvaraya Terminal Kaziranga Superfast Express
- Tambaram-Silghat Town Nagaon Express
- Sealdah–Sabroom Kanchanjunga Express
- Sealdah–Silchar Kanchanjunga Express
- Dibrugarh–Howrah Kamrup Express Via Guwahati
- Dibrugarh–Howrah Kamrup Express Via Rangapara North
- Kamakhya - Delhi Brahmaputra Mail
- New Jalpaiguri - Bongaigaon Express
- Alipurduar–Silghat Town Rajya Rani Express
- Alipurduar–Lumding Intercity Express
- Alipurduar–Kamakhya Intercity Express

== History ==
Fakiragram railway station came up with the construction of the Golokganj–Amingaon railway line by Assam-Behar State Railway in the 1900–1910 period. During the period Assam was connected to the rest of India entirely through eastern Bengal.

In pre-independence days, there was a metre-gauge line Katihar–Radhikapur–Biral–Parbatipur–Teesta–Gitaldaha–Golokganj–Fakiragram.

With the partition of India in 1947, the railway link to Assam through East Bengal was broken and Assam got delinked from the railway network in the rest of India. Indian Railways took up the Assam Link Project in 1948 to build a rail link between Fakiragram and Kishanganj. Fakiragram was connected to the Indian railway system in 1950.

Construction of the 265 km (165 mi)-long 5 ft 6 in (1,676 mm) broad gauge in the New Maynaguri–Jogighopa line, between 1963 and 1965, brought broad-gauge railways to Assam.

Fakiragram–Dhubri line was opened in September 2010 after conversion to broad gauge.

== Electrification ==
Electrification of the Barauni–Katihar–Guwahati line was sanctioned in 2008. In the document on Vision 2020 – A Blue Print for Railway Electrification Programme, in the list of ongoing projects the entire route km (836) is shown as balance work as on 1 April 2010. The entire electrification project is scheduled to be completed by October, 2015.

== Amenities ==
Fakiragram railway station has one double-bedded retiring room.

Preceding station	Indian Railways	Following station
Chautara towards ?	Northeast Frontier Railway zone New Jalpaiguri–New Bongaigaon section	Kokrajhar towards ?
Terminus	Northeast Frontier Railway zone Fakiragram–Dhubri branch line	Saptagram towards ?
