= Gumanihat railway station =

Railway Station in West Bengal, India

Gumanihat Railway Station

General information
- Location: Siliguri Road, Kusaribari, Gumanihat, Dist : Cooch Behar State: West Bengal; India
- Coordinates: 26.474136°N 89.239579°E
- Elevation: 59 metres (194 ft)
- System: Indian Railways Station
- Owner: Indian Railways
- Operator: Northeast Frontier Railway zone
- Lines: Barauni–Guwahati line, New Jalpaiguri–New Bongaigaon section
- Platforms: 2
- Tracks: 3 (broad gauge)

Construction
- Parking: Available

Other information
- Status: Functioning
- Station code: GUZ
- Zone(s): Northeast Frontier Railway zone
- Division(s): Alipurduar
Location
- Location within West Bengal Location within India

Gumanihat Railway Station serves the villages of Gumanihat and nearby areas like Kusaribari, Bailpari, Lotapota, Ramthenga, Chhat Dwarikamari, Dauaguri etc. of Cooch Behar district and Alipurduar district in the Indian state of West Bengal. It is 8 km away from the city of Falakata. The station lies on the New Jalpaiguri–New Bongaigaon section of Barauni–Guwahati line of Northeast Frontier Railway. This station falls under Alipurduar railway division.
