= Jorai railway station =

Railway Station in West Bengal, India

Jorai Railway Station

General information
- Location: National Highway 31C, Jorai, Dist - Coochbehar State: West Bengal; India
- Coordinates: 26.4561°N 89.8048°E
- Elevation: 53 metres (174 ft)
- System: Indian Railways Station
- Owner: Indian Railways
- Operator: Northeast Frontier Railway zone
- Lines: Barauni–Guwahati line, New Jalpaiguri–New Bongaigaon section
- Platforms: 3
- Tracks: 4 (broad gauge)

Construction
- Structure type: At grade
- Parking: Available

Other information
- Status: Functioning
- Station code: JOQ
- Zone(s): Northeast Frontier Railway zone
- Division(s): Alipurduar
Location
- Location within West Bengal Location within India

Jorai Railway Station serves the areas of Jorai, Cooch Behar district in the Indian state of West Bengal. This station lies on the border of West Bengal and Assam. The station lies on the New Jalpaiguri–New Bongaigaon section of Barauni–Guwahati line of Northeast Frontier Railway. This station falls under Alipurduar railway division.
