= Sutunga =

River in the Indian West Bengali district of Cooch Behar

The Sutunga (Bengali: সুটুঙ্গা) is a river in the Cooch Behar district in the Indian state of West Bengal. It passes the town of Mathabhanga before flowing into the Jaldhaka River.
