= Changrabandha railway station =

Railway station in West Bengal, India

Changrabandha

General information
- Location: Changrabandha, Mekhliganj, Cooch Behar district, West Bengal; India
- Coordinates: 26°24′47″N 88°55′09″E
- System: Indian Railways station
- Owner: Indian Railways
- Operator: Northeast Frontier Railway
- Line: New Mal–Changrabandha–New Cooch Behar line
- Platforms: 2
- Tracks: 5

Construction
- Structure type: At grade
- Parking: Yes

Other information
- Status: Line converted to broad gauge
- Station code: CBD
- Zone(s): Northeast Frontier Railway
- Division(s): Alipurduar

History
- Former names: Bengal Dooars Railway
Location
- Location within West Bengal Location within India

Changrabandha station code CBD is one of the railway station serving the town of Changrabandha alongwith New Changrabandha railway station station code: NCBD in Mekhliganj CD block, Cooch Behar district in the Indian state of West Bengal.

== History ==
The Lalmonirhat–Malbazar metre-gauge line was developed by the Bengal Dooars Railway in the closing years of the nineteenth century. With the partition of India in 1947, the Indian side of the line terminated at Changrabandha and the Pakistani side, later Bangladeshi side, at Burimari.

== Present status ==
The line between New Mal Jn. and Changrabandha is now (2016) converted to broad gauge. The introduction of the train services was delayed as a result of delay in environmental clearance. However, a pair of DMUs have been introduced on this route from Siliguri to Changrabandha via New Mal Jn from 20 January 2016. There is a train from New Cooch Behar to Siliguri Jn via Changrabandha.

The Bangladeshi side of the line is still functional. The Karotua Express runs daily between Burimari and Lalmonirhat. There are 2 commuter trains daily between Burimari and Lalmonirhat.
