= Maynaguri Road railway station =

Railway station in West Bengal

Maynaguri Road Railway Station

General information
- Location: Maynaguri - Barnes Ghat Road, Dakshin Ulladabari, Dist - Jalpaiguri State: West Bengal; India
- Coordinates: 26.526997°N 88.799854°E
- Elevation: 82 metres (269 ft)
- System: Indian Railways station
- Owner: Indian Railways
- Operator: Northeast Frontier Railway
- Line: New Mal–Changrabandha–New Cooch Behar line
- Platforms: 2

Construction
- Structure type: At grade
- Parking: Available

Other information
- Station code: MYGD
- Zone(s): NFR
- Division(s): Alipurduar
Location
- Location within West Bengal Location within India

Maynaguri Road Railway Station is one of the railway station that serves the town of Maynaguri in Jalpaiguri district of West Bengal, India, the other being New Maynaguri railway station. Maynaguri Road Railway station lies on New Mal–Changrabandha–New Cooch Behar line of Northeast Frontier Railway Alipurduar railway division.

== Trains ==
Trains like

- "Siliguri Junction Bamanhat DEMU".
- "Siliguri Junction New Bongaigaon DEMU".
- "Alipurduar Junction - Bangaon Express".

are available from this station.
