= Chautara railway station =

Railway station in West Bengal, India

Chautara Railway Station

General information
- Location: National Highway 31C, Chautara, Dist - Kokrajhar (B.T.A.D.) State: Assam; India
- Coordinates: 26.1507°N 90.0864°E
- Elevation: 44 metres (144 ft)
- System: Indian Railways Station
- Owner: Indian Railways
- Operator: Northeast Frontier Railway zone
- Lines: Barauni–Guwahati line, New Jalpaiguri–New Bongaigaon section
- Platforms: 2
- Tracks: 3 (broad gauge)

Construction
- Parking: Available

Other information
- Status: Functioning
- Station code: CROA
- Zone(s): Northeast Frontier Railway zone
- Division(s): Alipurduar
Location
- Location within Assam Location within India

Chautara Railway Station serves the town of Chautara which lies in Kokrajhar district in the Indian state of Assam. The station lies on the New Jalpaiguri–New Bongaigaon section of Barauni–Guwahati line of Northeast Frontier Railway, and falls under Alipurduar railway division.
