= Neora Naddi railway station =

Railway station in West Bengal, India

Neora Naddi Railway Station

General information
- Location: Malbazar - Maynaguri road ( NH - 31), Neora, P.s. - Malbazar, Dist - Jalpaiguri State: West Bengal; India
- Coordinates: 26.743249°N 88.745714°E
- Elevation: 118 metres (387 ft)
- System: Indian Railways Station
- Owner: Indian Railways
- Operator: Northeast Frontier Railway zone
- Line: New Mal–Changrabandha–New Cooch Behar line
- Platforms: 1
- Tracks: 2 (broad gauge)

Construction
- Parking: Available

Other information
- Status: Functioning
- Station code: NOR
- Zone(s): Northeast Frontier Railway zone
- Division(s): Alipurduar
Location
- Location within West Bengal Location within India

Neora Naddi Railway Station is the railway station that serves tea gardens and nearby areas of Neora Naddi, Kumali, Neora, Kumarpara, Rajadanga etc in Jalpaiguri district in the Indian state of West Bengal. The station lies on New Mal–Changrabandha–New Cooch Behar line of Northeast Frontier Railway, Alipurduar railway division. Some local trains like Siliguri Bamanhat DEMU, Siliguri New Bongaigaon DEMU, Siliguri Dhubri DEMU etc are available from this station daily.
