= Bikaner–Guwahati Express derailment =

Train derailment in Jalpaiguri district, West Bengal

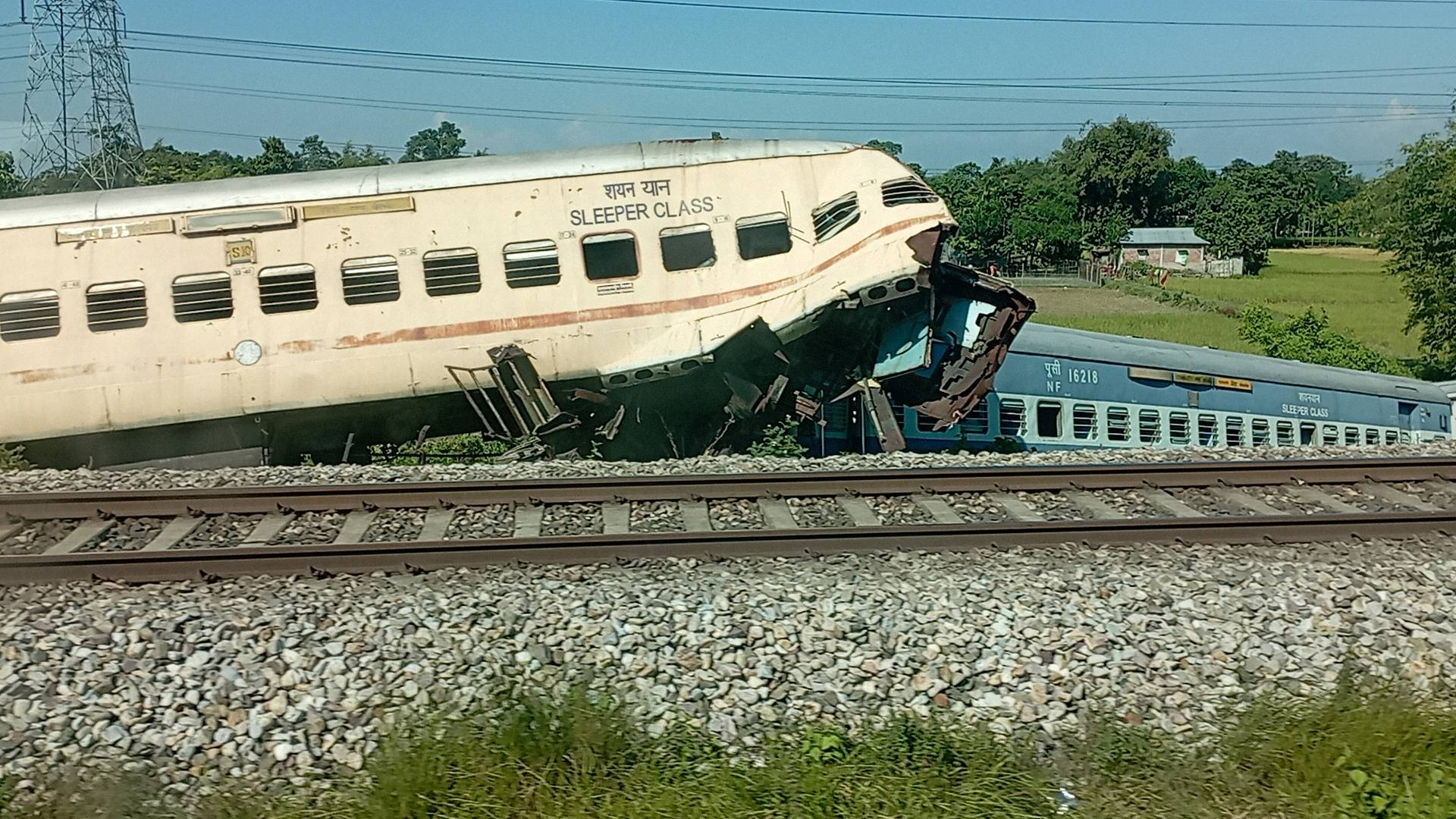

- Location within West Bengal Location within India

Details
- Date: 13 January 2022; 16:55 (IST)
- Location: Domohani, Maynaguri, Jalpaiguri, West Bengal
- Coordinates: 26°34′15″N 88°47′45″E
- Country: India
- Line: New Jalpaiguri–New Bongaigaon section
- Operator: Indian Railways
- Owner: Indian Railways
- Incident type: Derailment
- Cause: Technical malfunction in locomotive due to irregular maintenance

Statistics
- Trains: 1 (Bikaner-Guwahati Express)
- Vehicles: WAP-4 locomotive
- Passengers: 1,037
- Deaths: 9
- Injured: 50

On 13 January 2022, the Bikaner–Guwahati Express train derailed near Domohani, Maynaguri, Jalpaiguri district, West Bengal (the train was led by WAP-4 electrified locomotive). Nine people were killed and 50 people were injured. This was the first major train derailment in 2022, and the first in India since the Seemanchal Express derailment in Bihar in February 2019.

== Accident ==
On 13 January 2022, at 16:55 IST, 12 of the 18 coaches of the Bikaner–Guwahati Express derailed near Maynaguri in the Jalpaiguri district of West Bengal, India. The train was traveling from Bikaner in Rajasthan to Guwahati in Assam.

An accident relief train with paramedic staff was sent to the site, according to a North East Frontier Railway spokesperson.

After the derailment, the villagers came forward to help the trapped passengers. Emergency services arrived at the scene within a few minutes and the trapped passengers were rescued and were rushed to Jalpaiguri district hospital and Maynaguri rural hospital. Passengers in critical condition were sent to North Bengal Medical College and Hospital in Siliguri.

According to Railway minister, Ashwini Vaishnaw, initial probe of the incident pointed towards a technical glitch in the locomotive of the train.

A part of the New Jalpaiguri–New Bongaigaon section line was closed due to extensive damage to the tracks. The line was opened for operations on 15 January following necessary repairs.

== Investigation ==
The Commission of Railway Safety (CRS) initiated a 'high-level' probe into the incident.

Five days later, a team of inspectors from the State Forensic Science Laboratory (SFSL) of West Bengal were deployed at the scene. The inspectors reviewed the scene by examining the engine's traction motors and the derailed coaches. The team along with Soma Das Mitra, the deputy inspector general (railways) of the state police also interviewed the train driver.

=== Initial safety report ===
The initial safety report issued by the Alipurduar railway division under Northeast Frontier Railway zone of Indian Railways concluded that the incident occurred due to irregular maintenance.

The report points out that the last scheduled maintenance date of the locomotive on 9 January 2022 was skipped and the locomotive hadn't been inspected since its last inspection on 11 November 2021. It also stated that one of the traction motors fell off the locomotive, prompting the drivers to apply emergency brakes to the speeding train causing the last two assemblies of the locomotive to derail.

=== Final safety report ===
The final safety report issued by the Commission of Railway Safety (CRS) revealed that the locomotive bearing number 22375 had skipped numerous inspections. According to the report, the WAP-4 locomotive must be inspected after every 4,500 km but the ill-fated locomotive was running continuously for 16,000 km without any maintenance.

The report added that the locomotive was a 'missing link loco'. All locomotives have their mother divisions where they undergo maintenance and repairs. This locomotive was running in the National Capital Region (NCR) far away from its division. This led to irregular maintenance. It also stated that these 'missing link loco' undergo maintenance at locations without proper infrastructure and these 'ghost inspections' were a matter of concern for the Indian Railways.

== Response ==
India's Railway minister Ashwini Vaishnaw announced an ex-gratia payment of ₹5 lakh each to the next of kin of those who lost their lives and ₹1 lakh each for seriously injured passengers. He further announced ₹25,000 for passengers with minor injuries. Chief Minister of West Bengal, Mamata Banerjee and Prime Minister Narendra Modi also assisted the injured people by providing cash amounts to them.
