= Alipurduar–Silghat Town Rajya Rani Express =

Express train that runs between Alipurdar Junction and Silghat Town in India

Rajya Rani Express
Overview
- Service type: Rajya Rani Express
- Locale: Assam & West Bengal
- First service: 12 February 2012; 14 years ago
- Current operator: Northeast Frontier Railways

Route
- Termini: Alipurduar (APDJ); Silghat Town (SHTT)
- Stops: 26
- Distance travelled: 560 km (348 mi)
- Average journey time: 16 hours 40 mins
- Service frequency: Daily
- Train number: 15417 / 15418

On-board services
- Classes: General Unreserved, Sleeper class
- Seating arrangements: Yes
- Sleeping arrangements: Yes
- Catering facilities: No
- Other facilities: Below the seats

Technical
- Rolling stock: ICF coach
- Track gauge: 1,676 mm (5 ft 6 in)
- Operating speed: 34 km/h (21 mph) average including halts
Route map
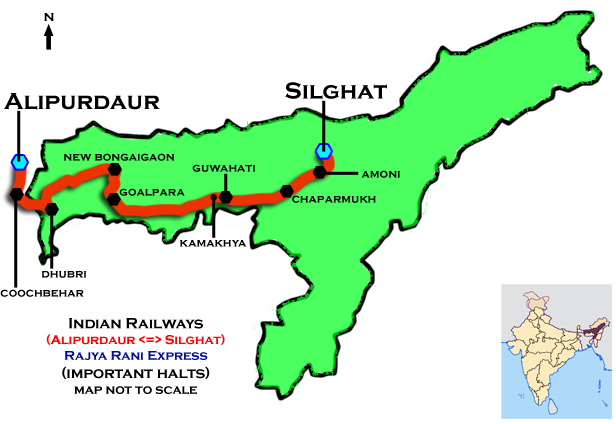

The 15417 / 15418 Rajya Rani Express is an Express train belonging to Indian Railways Northeast Frontier Railway zone that runs between Alipurduar Junction and Silghat Town in India.This train is a part of Rajya Rani Express series from West Bengal & Assam state.

It operates as train number 15417 from Alipurduar Junction to Silghat Town and as train number 15418 in the reverse direction, serving the states of West Bengal & Assam.

== Coaches ==
The 15417 / 18 Rajya Rani Express has one sleeper class, six general unreserved & two SLR (seating with luggage rake) coaches. It does not carry a pantry car.

As is customary with most train services in India, coach composition may be amended at the discretion of Indian Railways depending on demand.

== Service ==
The 15417 Alipurduar Junction–Silghat Rajya Rani Express covers the distance of 560 km (348 mi) in 17 hours 55 mins (31 km/h) and in 15 hours 10 mins as the 15418 Silghat–Alipurduar Junction Rajya Rani Express (37 km/h).

As the average speed of the train is less than 55 km/h (34 mph), as per railway rules, its fares doesn't includes a Superfast surcharge.

== Routing ==
The 15417/15418 Rajya Rani Express runs from

- Alipurduar Junction via
- New Cooch Behar
- Tufanganj Railway Station
- Golokganj
- Dhubri
- Fakiragram Junction
- Kokrajhar
- New Bongaigaon Junction
- Kamakhya
- Guwahati
- Chaparmukh Junction to
- Silghat Town.

== Traction ==
As the route is not electrified, a New Guwahati-based WDM-3D / WDM-3A diesel locomotive pulls the train to its destination.
