= Mathabhanga railway station =

Railway Station in West Bengal, India

Mathabhanga Railway Station

General information
- Location: Mathabhanga Railway Station, Khaterbari, Hazrahat I GP, Pin -736146, Dist - Coochbehar State: West Bengal; India
- Coordinates: 26.33°N 89.22°E
- Elevation: 54 metres (177 ft)
- System: Indian Railways Station
- Owner: Indian Railways
- Operator: Northeast Frontier Railway zone
- Line: New Mal–Changrabandha–New Cooch Behar line
- Platforms: 1
- Tracks: 2 (broad gauge)

Construction
- Structure type: At grade
- Parking: Available

Other information
- Status: Functioning
- Station code: MHBA
- Zone(s): Northeast Frontier Railway zone
- Division(s): Alipurduar

History
- Electrified: Under Process
Location
- Location within India Location within West Bengal

Mathabhanga Railway Station serves the town of Mathabhanga which lies in the bank of River Jaldhaka in Cooch Behar district in the Indian state of West Bengal. The station lies on the New Mal–Changrabandha–New Cooch Behar line of Northeast Frontier Railway. The station lies on Alipurduar railway division.

== Trains ==
Major Trains:

- Dibrugarh–Kanyakumari Vivek Express
- New Tinsukia–Rajendra Nagar Weekly Express
- New Alipurduar - Sealdah Superfast Padatik Express
