= Dhubri railway station =

Indian railway station in Assam

DHUBRI

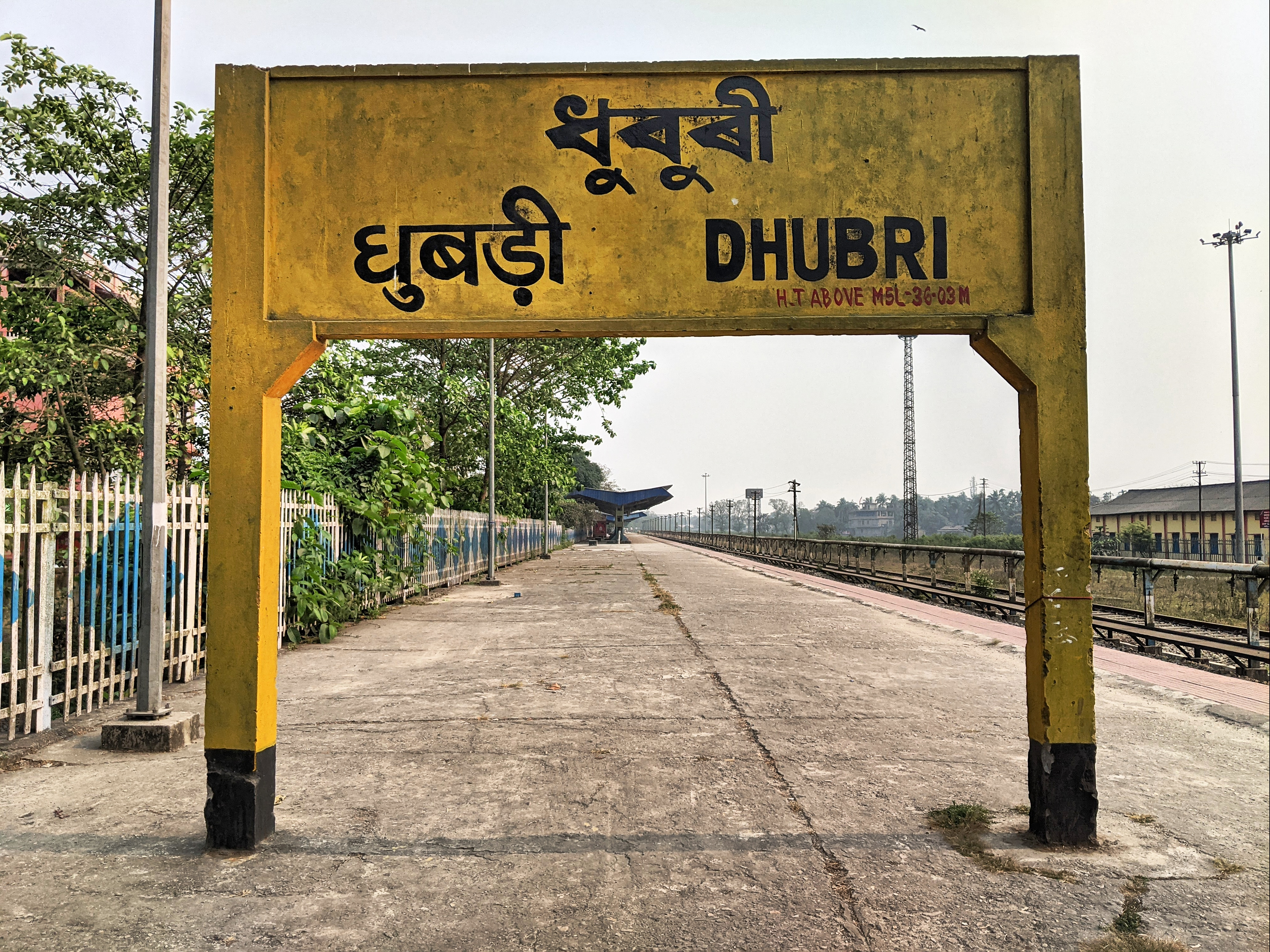

General information
- Location: Ward No.14, Station Road, Bidyapara, Dhubri, Assam; India
- Coordinates: 26°01′23″N 89°58′39″E
- Elevation: 30 metres (98 ft)
- System: Indian Railways station
- Owner: Indian Railways
- Operator: Northeast Frontier Railway
- Lines: Fakiragram–Dhubri branch line; New Cooch Behar–Golokganj branch line
- Platforms: 2
- Tracks: 2

Construction
- Structure type: At grade
- Parking: Yes
- Cycle facilities: No

Other information
- Status: Functioning
- Station code: DBB
- Division(s): Alipurduar

History
- Opened: 1903
- Closed: 1988
- Rebuilt: 2010
- Former names: Eastern Bengal Railway
Location
- Location within Assam Location within India

Dhubri is the terminal railway station on the Fakiragram–Dhubri branch line. It also links to the New Cooch Behar–Golokganj branch line. A new line is being laid to connect Dhubri with Jogighopa. It is located on the west bank of the Brahmaputra in Dhubri district in the Indian state of Assam. Important trains like Alipurduar–Silghat Town Rajya Rani Express, Siliguri–Dhubri Intercity Express are available from Dhubri. It lies under Alipurduar railway division of Northeast Frontier Railway zone.

== Geography ==
Dhubri district occupies the south-west corner of Assam. It borders on Bangladesh, and the Indian states of West Bengal and Meghalaya. The Brahmaputra divides the district into two parts. Tributaries of the Brahmaputra such as Gangadhar, Gaurang, Tipkai, Champamoti in the north and Jinjiram, Jinari and Kaloo in the south are all major contributors of floods in the area.

== History ==
The Fakiragram–Dhubri line was opened in September 2010 after conversion to 5 ft 6 in (1,676 mm) broad gauge. Dhubri railway station had initially been opened in 1904. Flood waters had washed away the tracks in 1988. The 66 kilometres (41 mi) long line was ready after gauge conversion in 2010.

Up to the sixties there was a 1,000 mm (3 ft 3 3/8 in)-wide metre-gauge railway link from Cooch Behar to Dhubri via Golokganj. It was then known as the Assam Line Railway Service. It also connected East Pakistan, even after partition. However, collapse of the rail-cum-road bridge over the Gadadhar in the seventies ended that link. The bridge has been rebuilt and the track laid again as broad gauge. Dhubri-New Jalpaiguri Inter-city Express via Alipurduar Jn was introduced in February 2012.

Preceding station	Indian Railways	Following station
Terminus	Northeast Frontier Railway zone Fakiragram–Dhubri branch line	Gauripur towards ?
