= Kranti (community development block) =

- Community development block
- Interactive map of Kranti
- Coordinates: 26.69°N 88.72°E
- Country: India
- State: West Bengal
- District: Jalpaiguri

Population (2011)
  - Total: 123,649

Languages
  - Official: Bengali, English
- Time zone: UTC+5:30 (IST)
- Lok Sabha constituency: Jalpaiguri
- Vidhan Sabha constituency: Mal
- Website: jalpaiguri.gov.in

Kranti is a community development block (CD block) that forms an administrative division in the Malbazar subdivision of the Jalpaiguri district in the Indian state of West Bengal.

== Geography ==
Kranti is located at 26.69°N 88.72°E.

The Kranti CD block is bounded by the Mal CD block on the north, Matiali and Maynaguri CD block on the east, Jalpaiguri CD block on the south, Rajganj CD block on the west.

== Gram panchayats ==
The Kranti CD block consists of 6 gram panchayats and It has 1 panchayat samiti.

They are:

- Kranti
- Rajadanga
- Changmar
- Lataguri
- Chapadanga
- Moulani

=== Lataguri ===
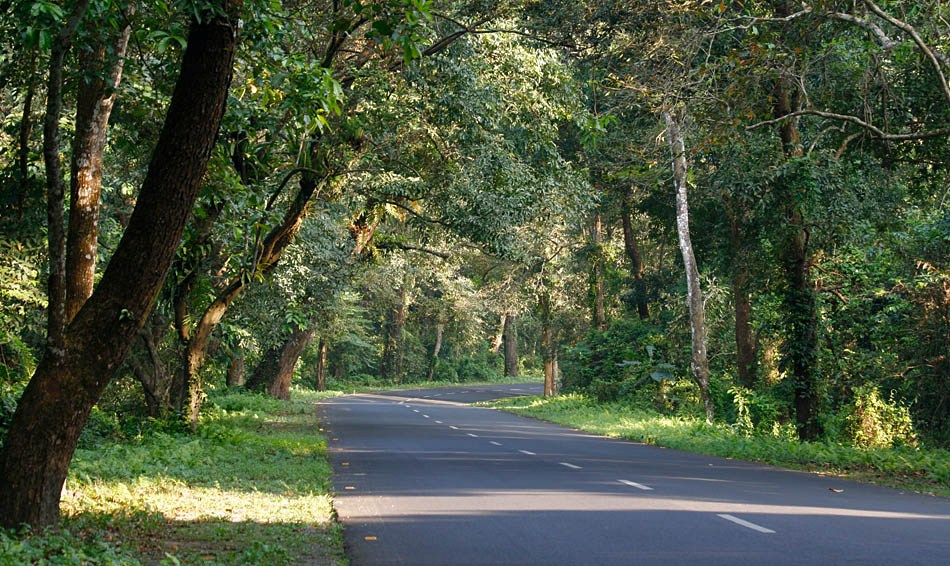
National Highway 717 at Lataguri

Places and tea estates in Malbabazar subdivision (including Mal, Nagrakata and Matiali CD blocks) in Jalpaiguri district
CT: census town, R: rural/ urban centre, N: neighbourhood, NP: national park/ wildlife sanctuary, TE: tea estate
Abbreviations used in names – TG for Tea Garden (town/village), TE for Tea Estate, JRS: junction railway station
Owing to space constraints in the small map, the actual locations in a larger map may vary slightly

Lataguri is a gram panchayats of the block. located outside the Gorumara National Park on National Highway No. 31. Permits for entering Gorumara and Chapramari Wildlife Sanctuary are given from Lataguri. The village also contains a "Nature Interpretation Center", which gives information about the flora and fauna of the area. A few roadside restaurants ("Dhabas") and hotels cater to tourists.

Gorumara National Park has overtaken traditionally popular Jaldapara National Park in footfall and Malbazar has emerged as one of the most important towns in the Dooars. Malbazar subdivision is presented in the map alongside. It is a predominantly rural area with 88.62% of the population living in rural areas and 11.32% living in the urban areas. Tea gardens in the Dooars and Terai regions produce 226 million kg or over a quarter of India's total tea crop. Some tea gardens were identified in the 2011 census as census towns or villages. Such places are marked in the map as CT (census town) or R (rural/ urban centre). Specific tea estate pages are marked TE.

Note: The map alongside presents some of the notable locations in the subdivision. All places marked in the map are linked in the larger full-screen map.

==== Demographics ====
According to the 2011 Census of India, Lataguri had a total population of 4,981 of which 2,517 (51%) were males and 2,464 (49%) were females. There were 578 persons in the age range of 0 to 6 years. The total number of literate people in Lataguri was 3,522 (79.99% of the population over 6 years).

==== Infrastructure ====
According to the District Census Handbook 2011, Jalpaiguri, Lataguri covered an area of 3.0268 km^{2}. Among the civic amenities, it had 5 km roads with open drains, the protected water supply involved river infiltration gallery, service reservoir, overhead tank. It had 548 domestic electric connections, 250 road lighting points. Among the medical facilities, it had 1 dispensary/ health centre, 4 medicine shops. Among the educational facilities, it had 3 primary schools, 2 middle schools, 2 secondary schools, 1 senior secondary school. Among the social, cultural, and recreational facilities, it had 1 public library, 1 reading room. It had a branch of 1 nationalised bank.

==== Education ====
There are two high school one is Lataguri High School(Co-ed) and other one is Lataguri Girl's High School.

==== Railway ====
Lataguri railway station serves the town of Lataguri from where trains are available towards nearby towns and cities like Malbazar, Siliguri, Maynaguri, Cooch Behar, Alipurduar etc.

==== Roadways ====
National Highway 717 connects Lataguri with other towns and cities of West Bengal and other nearby states like Assam, Sikkim, Bihar etc

=== Rajadanga ===
Rajadanga is a small village and gram panchayat in the block. This area is mainly known as its agricultural works. It's tea gardens are also increasing rapidly, and there are 4-5 tea factories here. There is a higher secondary school, Rajadanga P M High School, in this panchayat area.

The nearest towns are:

- Malbazar (30 km)
- Siliguri (45 km)
- Jalpaiguri (50 km)
