= Tufanganj railway station =

Railway station in West Bengal, India

Tufanganj Railway Station

General information
- Location: Station road, Kamat Phulbari P, Tufanganj, Pin -736159, Dist - Cooch Behar State: West Bengal; India
- Coordinates: 26.3345°N 89.6699°E
- Elevation: 35 metres (115 ft)
- System: Indian Railways station
- Line: New Cooch Behar-Golokganj branch line
- Platforms: 3
- Tracks: 3

Construction
- Structure type: At grade
- Parking: yes

Other information
- Station code: TFGN
- Zone(s): North East Frontier Railway
- Division(s): Alipurduar

History
- Former names: Eastern Bengal Railway
Location
- Location within West Bengal Location within India

Tufanganj railway station serves the city of Tufanganj lying in Cooch Behar district in the Indian state of West Bengal. The station lies in New Cooch Behar-Golokganj branch line under Alipurduar railway division of Northeast Frontier Railway zone. Important trains like Kolkata–Sairang Express, Alipurduar–Silghat Town Rajya Rani Express, Siliguri–Dhubri Intercity Express are available from Tufanganj.
