= Gauripur railway station =

Railway station in Assam, India

General information
- Location: Dhubri - Kochugaon Rd, Gauripur, Dist - Dhubri State: Assam; India
- Coordinates: 26°05′N 89°58′E
- Elevation: 32 metres (105 ft)
- System: Indian Railways junction station
- Owner: Indian Railways
- Operator: Northeast Frontier Railway
- Lines: Fakiragram–Dhubri branch line New Cooch Behar–Golakganj branch line.
- Platforms: 3
- Tracks: 3

Construction
- Structure type: At grade
- Parking: yes
- Cycle facilities: Yes

Other information
- Status: Functioning
- Station code: GUP2
- Zone(s): Northeast Frontier Railway
- Division(s): Alipurduar

History
- Former names: Eastern Bengal Railway
Location
- Location within Assam Location within India

Gauripur Railway Station is a railway station on the Fakiragram–Dhubri branch line and the New Cooch Behar–Golakganj branch line. It is located in Dhubri district in the Indian state of Assam. This station serves the Gauripur town. It falls under Alipurduar railway division of Northeast Frontier Railway zone.
