= Bikaner–Guwahati Express =

Train in India

Overview
- Service type: Express
- Locale: Assam, West Bengal, Bihar, Uttar Pradesh & Rajasthan
- First service: 20 July 2002 (24 years ago)
- Current operator: Northeast Frontier Railway

Route
- Termini: Bikaner (BKN); Guwahati (GHY)
- Stops: 30
- Distance travelled: 2,315 km (1,438 mi)
- Average journey time: 48h 25m
- Service frequency: Weekly (Note: Runs two days in a week for every direction.)
- Train number: 15633 / 15634

On-board services
- Classes: AC 2 Tier, AC 3 Tier, Sleeper 3 Tier, General Unreserved
- Seating arrangements: No
- Sleeping arrangements: Yes
- Catering facilities: Available
- Baggage facilities: Below the seats

Technical
- Rolling stock: LHB coach
- Track gauge: 1,676 mm (5 ft 6 in)
- Operating speed: 48 km/h (30 mph) average including halts

The 15633 / 15634 Bikaner–Guwahati Express is an Express train belonging to Northeast Frontier Railway zone that runs between Bikaner Junction in Rajasthan and Guwahati in Assam in India. It is currently being operated with 15633/15634 train numbers on weekly basis.

== Service ==
- 15633 Bikaner–Guwahati Express has an average speed of 48 km/h and covers 2314 km in 48h 25m.
- 15634 Guwahati–Bikaner Express has an average speed of 52 km/h and covers 2314 km in 44h 25m.

== Route and halts ==
The important halts of the train are:

RAJASTHAN:

1. Bikaner (originates)
2. Nokha
3. Nagaur
4. Merta Road Bypass
5. Degana Junction
6. Makrana Junction
7. Kuchaman City
8. Jaipur Junction
9. Bharatpur Junction

UTTAR PRADESH:

1. Agra Fort
2. Tundla Junction
3. Kanpur Central
4. Prayagraj Junction
5. Pt. Deen Dayal Upadhyaya Junction

BIHAR:

1. Patna Junction
2. Barauni Junction
3. Katihar Junction
4. Kishanganj

WEST BENGAL:

1. Dalkhola
2. New Jalpaiguri (Siliguri)
3. New Cooch Behar
4. New Alipurduar

ASSAM:

1. New Bongaigaon
2. Barpeta Road
3. Rangiya
4. Kamakhya
5. Guwahati (terminates)

== Coach composition ==
The train consists of 22 coaches earlier was ICF now gets an LHB upgrade:

- 6 AC III Tier
- 2 AC II Tier
- 7 Sleeper coaches
- 4 General
- 1 Pantry car
- 2 Second-class Luggage/parcel van

== Traction ==
As the route is yet to be fully electrified, it is hauled by a Bhagat Ki Kothi Loco Shed-based WDP-4 / WDP-4B / WDP-4D diesel locomotive up to Agra Fort and is then transferred to a Jhansi Loco Shed-based WAP-4 electric locomotive for the remainder of the journey until Guwahati, and vice versa.

== Rake sharing ==
The train is attached to 15631/15632 Barmer–Guwahati Express at Merta Road Junction.

== Reversal ==
The train reverses its direction once:

- Merta Road Junction

== Accident ==
On January 13, 2022, Bikaner Guwahati Express got derailed between New Domohani and New Maynaguri railway station near Jalpaiguri in West Bengal at around 5 pm IST.

== See also ==
- Bikaner Junction railway station
- Guwahati railway station
- Barmer–Guwahati Express
- Mainaguri train accident - On 13 January 2022, Bikaner–Guwahati Express train derailed near Mainaguri, Jalpaiguri district, West Bengal.
