= Bengal Dooars Railway =

- Industry: Railways
- Founded: 1891
- Defunct: 1941
- Headquarters: Domohani, British India
- Area served: North Bengal
- Services: Rail transport

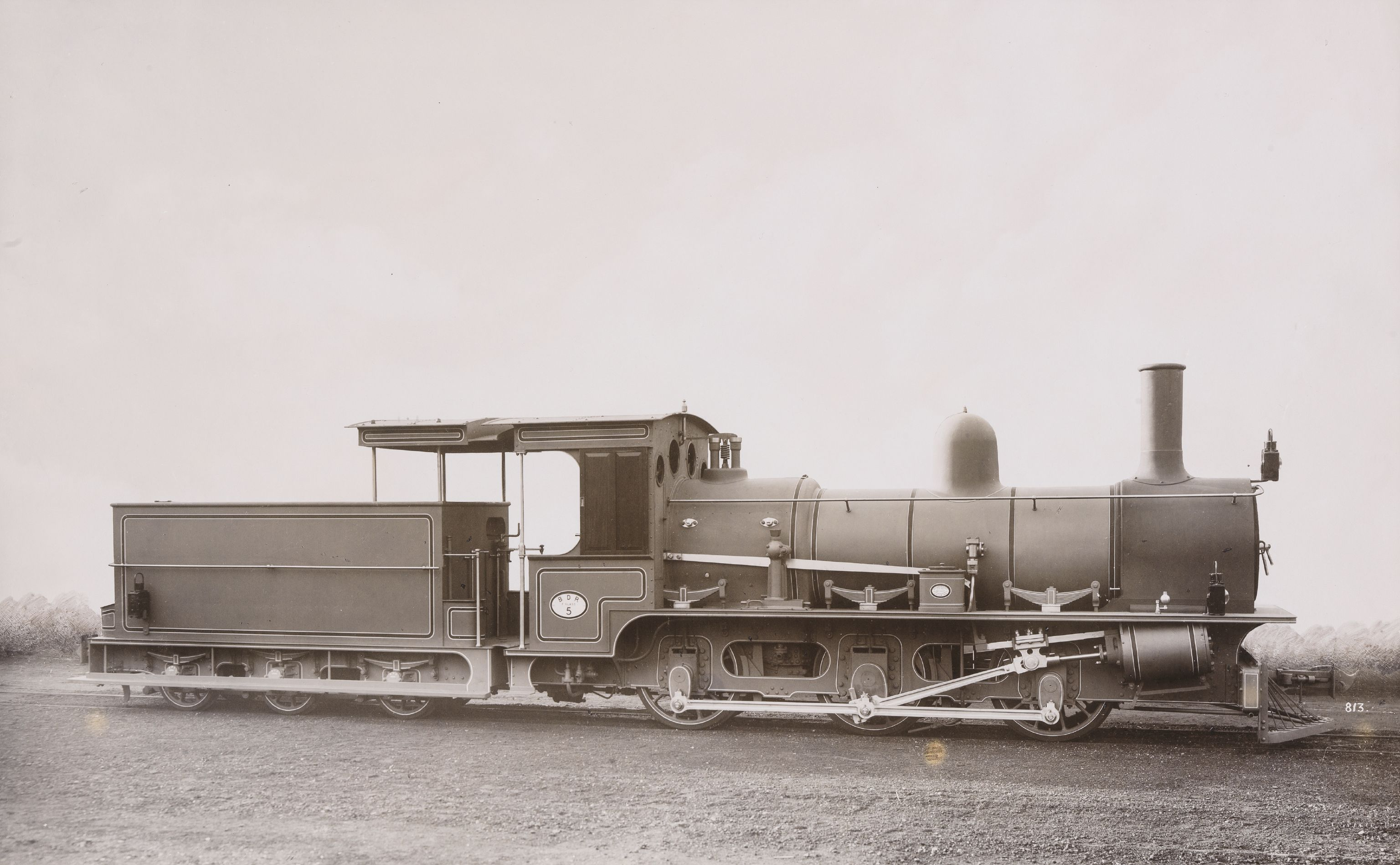
Steam locomotive No. 5 (Class F) of the Bengal Dooars Railway, ca. 1899

The Bengal Dooars Railway was formed in 1891 and amalgamated with the Eastern Bengal Railway in 1941. The Bengal Dooars Railway (shortened BDR) was one of the pioneering railway companies that operated from 1893 to 1941, in Bengal province of British India, connecting the Dooars with its junction with Eastern Bengal Railway at Lalmonirhat with locations up to the foot of the Himalayas near the border with Bhutan.

In 1936, the company owned 19 locomotives, 72 coaches and 473 goods wagons.

== Classification ==
It was labeled as a Class II railway according to Indian Railway Classification System of 1926.
