= New Jalpaiguri–New Bongaigaon section =

Railway line in India

New Jalpaiguri–New Bongaigaon Section (including Fakiragram-Dhubri branch line)
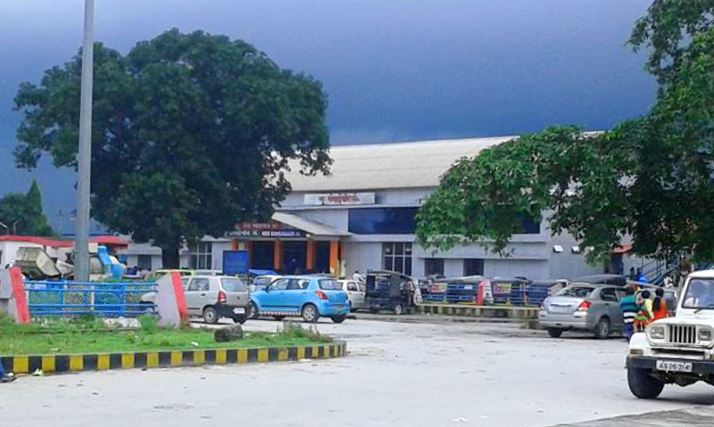
- New Bongaigaon Junction, an important railway station on New Jalpaiguri–New Bongaigaon section

Overview
- Status: Operational
- Owner: Indian Railways
- Locale: West Bengal, Assam
- Termini: New Jalpaiguri; New Bongaigaon
- Stations: 31

Service
- Operator: Northeast Frontier Railway

History
- Opened: 1963

Technical
- Line length: 252 km (157 mi)
- Track gauge: 5 ft 6 in (1,676 mm) broad gauge
- Electrification: Yes

The New Jalpaiguri–New Bongaigaon section of the Barauni–Guwahati line connects New Jalpaiguri in the Indian state of West Bengal and New Bongaigaon in Assam.

== History ==
During British rule, all links from the northern part of Bengal and Assam to the rest of India were through the eastern part of Bengal. The most important connection was the 529 kilometres (329 mi) long Calcutta–Parbatipur–Haldibari–Siliguri link first established in 1878 and then developed in stages (for details see Howrah-New Jalpaiguri Line). During the nineteenth century, Lalmonirhat was linked to the Dooars. In pre-independence days, a 581 kilometres (361 mi) long metre gauge line running via Radhikapur, Biral, Parbatipur, Tista, Gitaldaha and Golokganj connected Fakiragram in Assam with Katihar in Bihar.

With the partition of India in 1947, all these links were lost. Indian Railways took up the Assam Link Project in 1948 to build a 301.8 kilometres (187.5 mi) long rail link between Fakiragram and Kishanganj. Fakiragram was connected to the Indian railway system in 1950 through the Indian portion of North Bengal with a metre gauge track. The New Jalpaiguri–New Bongaigaon section was partly new construction, partly old line converted to 5 ft 6 in (1,676 mm) broad gauge in 1963. The 312 km (194 mi) long 1,000 mm (3 ft 3 3/8 in) meter gauge Siliguri-Jogihopa line was constructed between 1963 and 1965 & was converted to 1,676 mm (5 ft 6 in) wide 5 ft 6 in (1,676 mm) broad gauge in 1998 .

== Branch lines ==
The 56.75 kilometres (35.26 mi) long Haldibari–New Jalpaiguri line has gone through two successive gauge changes. As most other railway tracks in the area were metre gauge, the line was converted from 5 ft 6 in (1,676 mm) broad gauge to metre gauge in 1949. Then in 1960s when broad gauge was introduced in the area, the line was converted back to broad gauge and connected to the new station at New Jalpaiguri.

The 62.7 kilometres (39.0 mi) long metre gauge branch line from Malbazar in Jalpaiguri district to Changrabandha in Cooch Behar district is now made into 1,676 mm (5 ft 6 in) wide 5 ft 6 in (1,676 mm) broad gauge section in 2016 & extended 64.1 kilometres (39.8 mi) further to New Coochbehar, with train service, as per the railway time table. In pre-independence days, the line was up to Mogalhat, now in Bangladesh. The present 88.3 kilometres (54.9 mi) long metre gauge line on the Bangladesh side from Burimari to Lalmonirhat is still functional.

The Alipuduar–Bamanhat branch line ends near the India-Bangladesh border across the Dharla River. In pre-independence days, it used to connect to Mogalhat, now in Bangladesh, across the Dharla. The bridge is broken. The line from Golokganj meets the branch line. The 57.6 kilometres (35.8 mi) New Cooch Behar–Golokganj section is newly made into broad gauge via Boxirhat. The line passed through a different alignment.

The 76.5 kilometres (47.5 mi) Fakiragram-Dhubri branch line was inaugurated after gauge conversion in September 2010.

== Electrification ==
Electrification of the entire 593 kilometres (368 mi) long Katihar–Guwahati route is in progress & expected to completed by 2024.
