= Rajla Halt railway station =

Railway station in Bihar, India

RAJLA HALT
- Indian Railways logo

General information
- Location: Rajla Kala, Jamui district, Bihar; India
- Coordinates: 24.75574°N 86.42254°E
- System: Indian Railways station
- Owner: Indian Railways
- Operator: Eastern Railway
- Line: Asansol–Patna section of Howrah–Delhi main line
- Platforms: 2
- Tracks: Broad gauge

Construction
- Structure type: Standard (on ground station)
- Parking: No

Other information
- Status: Active
- Station code: RJLA
- Zone(s): Eastern Railway
- Division(s): Asansol
- Classification: HG-3

History
- Electrified: 1996–97
- Former names: East Indian Railway
Route map
Location
- Location within Bihar
- Interactive map

Rajla Halt railway station (station code: RJLA) is a railway station on Howrah–New Delhi main line operated by Eastern Railway zone of Indian Railways under Asansol Division. It is situated in Rajla Kala in Jamui district in the Indian state of Bihar.

== Facilities ==
The station has a ticket counter and two platforms, which are connected by a foot overbridge. It also has a small waiting area. Only MEMU passenger trains have scheduled halts here.
