= Madankata railway station =

Railway station in Deoghar district, Jharkhand, India

MADANKATA

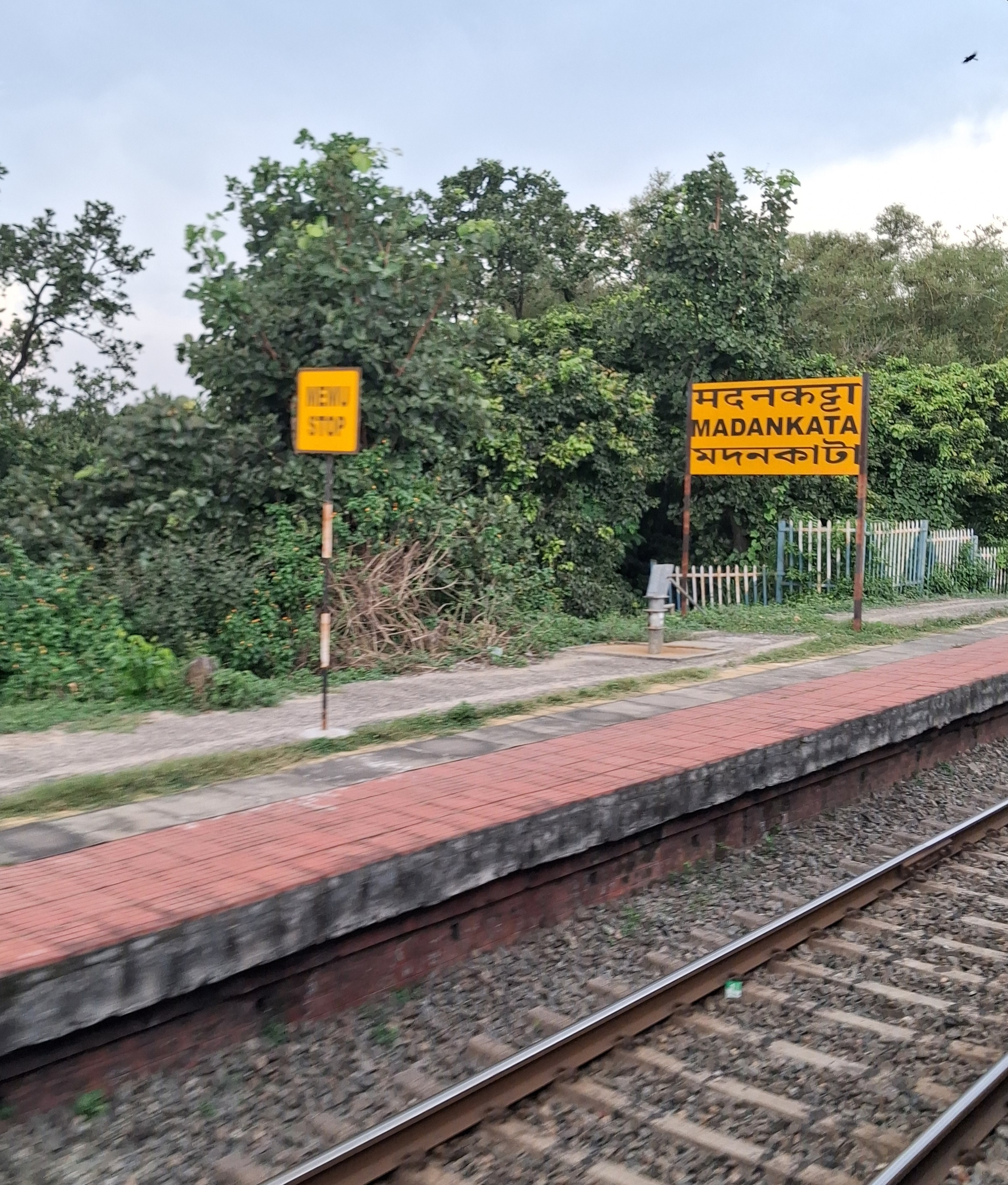

General information
- Location: Madankata, Sirsiya, Deoghar District, Jharkhand; India
- Coordinates: 24.16462°N 86.70406°E
- Elevation: 209 metres (686 ft)
- System: Indian Railways station
- Owner: Indian Railways
- Operator: Eastern Railway
- Line: Asansol–Patna section of Howrah–Delhi main line
- Platforms: 2
- Tracks: Broad gauge

Construction
- Structure type: Standard (on ground station)
- Parking: No

Other information
- Status: Active
- Station code: MNC
- Zone(s): Eastern Railway
- Division(s): Asansol
- Classification: NSG-6

History
- Electrified: 1996–97
- Former names: East Indian Railway
Route map
Location
- Location within Jharkhand
- Interactive map

Madankata railway station (station code: MNC) is a railway station on the Howrah–Delhi main line in Deoghar district, Jharkhand. It comes under the Asansol railway division of the Eastern Railway zone. The station is located between Vidyasagar and Joramow railway stations and serves Madankata, Sirsiya and its nearby villages. Only passenger and MEMU trains have scheduled halts here.

== Facilities ==
The station has two platforms, which are linked by a foot overbridge. Basic passenger facilities include a ticket counter, platform shelters, and a drinking water supply. However, amenities such as waiting rooms and retiring rooms are not available.

== Trains ==
Several passenger and MEMU trains halt at Madankata railway station. Important trains include:

- Howrah–Mokama Express (13029/13030)
- Asansol–Jasidih MEMU (63561/63563)
- Andal–Jasidih MEMU (63545/63546)
- Barddhaman–Jhajha MEMU (63509/63510)
- Baidyanathdham–Asansol MEMU (63562)
- Jasidih–Asansol MEMU (63564)

== See also ==
- Asansol railway division
- Eastern Railway zone
- Howrah–Delhi main line
- Asansol–Patna section
