= Tulsitanr railway station =

Railway station in Jharkhand, India

TULSITANR
- Indian Railways logo

General information
- Location: Tulsitanr, Deoghar District, Jharkhand; India
- Coordinates: 24.56920°N 86.61387°E
- System: Indian Railways station
- Owner: Indian Railways
- Operator: Eastern Railway
- Line: Asansol–Patna section of Howrah–Delhi main line
- Platforms: 2
- Tracks: Broad gauge

Construction
- Structure type: Standard (on ground station)
- Parking: No

Other information
- Status: Active
- Station code: TTN
- Zone(s): Eastern Railway
- Division(s): Asansol

History
- Electrified: 1996–97
- Former names: East Indian Railway
Route map
Location
- Location within Jharkhand
- Interactive map

Tulsitanr railway station (station code: TTN) is a railway station on Howrah–New Delhi main line operated by Eastern Railway zone of Indian Railways. It is situated in Tulsitanr in Deoghar district in the Indian state of Jharkhand.

== Facilities ==
The station has very limited facilities and is served only by EMU and passenger trains.
