= Lahabon railway station =

Railway station in Bihar, India

LAHABON
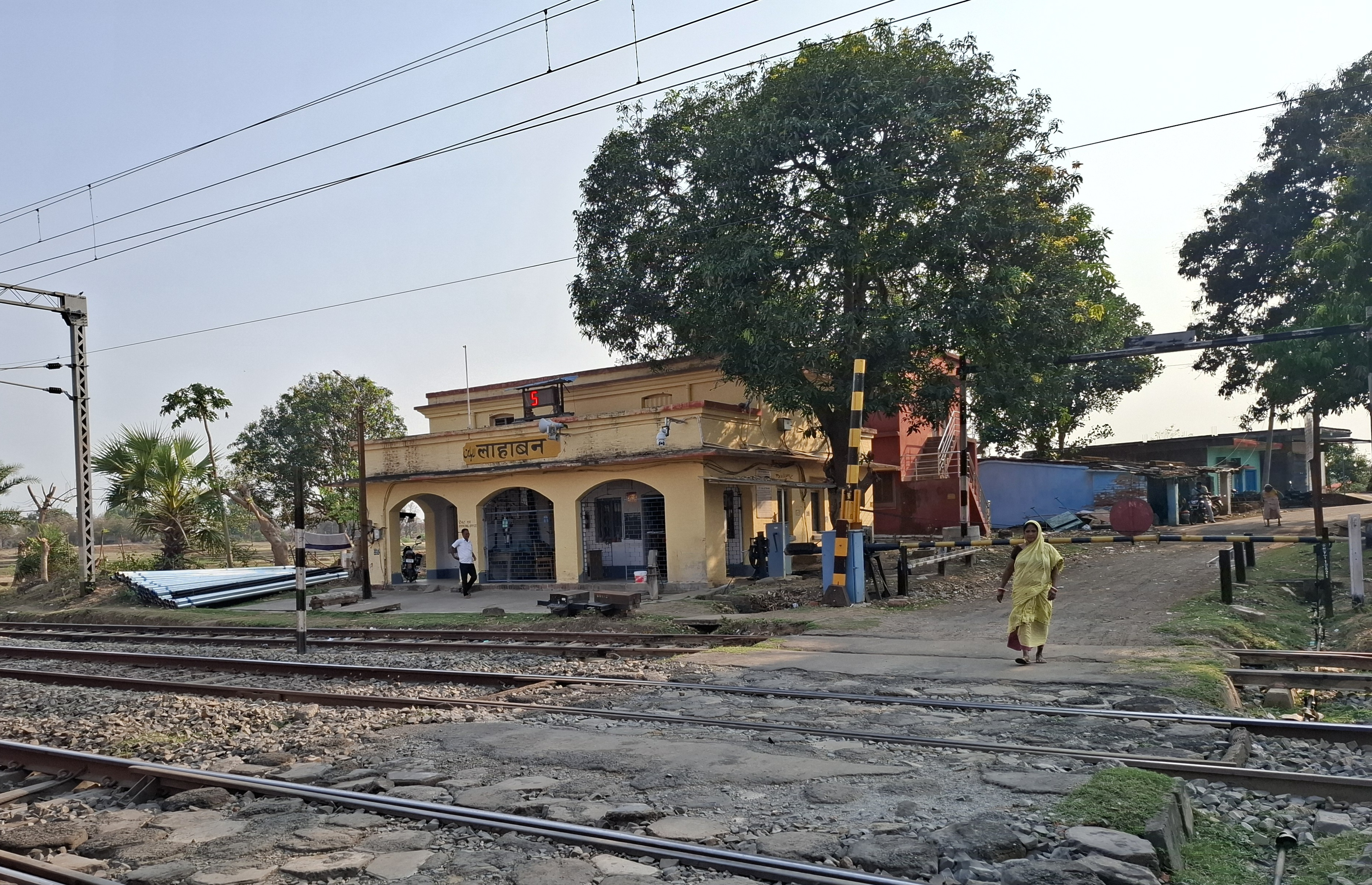
- Lahabon railway station

General information
- Location: Lahabon, Jamui district, Bihar; India
- Coordinates: 24.64052°N 86.60029°E
- System: Indian Railways station
- Owner: Indian Railways
- Operator: Eastern Railway
- Line: Asansol–Patna section of Howrah–Delhi main line
- Platforms: 3
- Tracks: Broad gauge

Construction
- Structure type: Standard (on ground station)
- Parking: No

Other information
- Status: Active
- Station code: LHB
- Zone(s): Eastern Railway
- Division(s): Asansol
- Classification: NSG-6

History
- Electrified: 1996–97
- Former names: East Indian Railway
Route map
Location
- Location within Bihar
- Interactive map

Lahabon railway station (station code: LHB) is a railway station on Howrah–New Delhi main line operated by Eastern Railway zone of Indian Railways under Asansol Division. It is situated in Lahabon in Jamui district in the Indian state of Bihar.

== Facilities ==
The station has three platforms with a small waiting room which is connected through a foot over bridge. Only MEMU passengers trains have scheduled halts here.
