= Salanpur railway station =

Railway station in Paschim Bardhaman district, West Bengal, India

SALANPUR

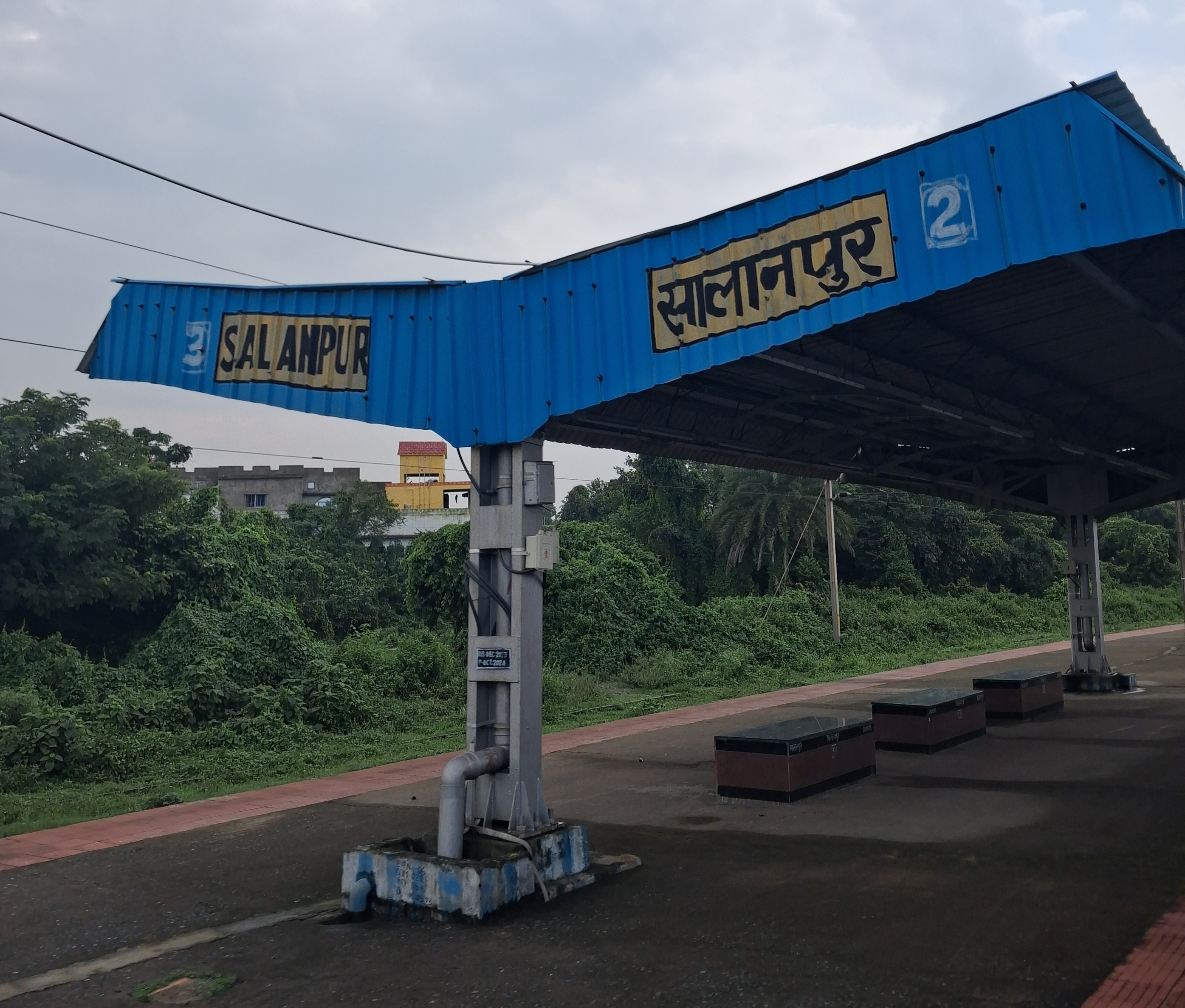
- View of the station board from two of the platforms

General information
- Location: Salanpur, Paschim Bardhaman district, West Bengal; India
- Coordinates: 23.76226°N 86.87495°E
- Elevation: 166 metres (545 ft)
- System: Indian Railways station
- Owner: Indian Railways
- Operator: Eastern Railway
- Line: Asansol–Patna section of Howrah–Delhi main line
- Platforms: 3
- Tracks: Broad Gauge

Construction
- Structure type: Standard (on ground station)
- Parking: No

Other information
- Status: Active
- Station code: SLS
- Zone(s): Eastern Railway
- Division(s): Asansol
- Classification: NSG-6

History
- Electrified: 1996–97
- Former names: East Indian Railway
Route map
Location
- Location within West Bengal
- Interactive map

Salanpur railway station (station code: SLS) is a railway station on the Howrah–Delhi main line under the Asansol railway division of the Eastern Railway zone. It is situated between Rupnarayanpur and Sitarampur railway station in Paschim Bardhaman district of West Bengal, India. Only Passenger and MEMU trains have scheduled halts here.

== Facilities ==
The station has three platforms, which are linked by a foot overbridge. Basic passenger facilities include a ticket counter, platform sheds and a drinking water supply. However, amenities such as retiring rooms are not available as of yet.

== Administration ==
The station falls under the administrative control of the Eastern Railway zone of Asansol railway division. Its station code is SLS.

== See also ==
- Asansol railway division
- Eastern Railway zone
- Howrah–Delhi main line
