= Narganjo Halt railway station =

Railway station in Bihar, India

NARGANJO HALT
- Indian Railways logo

General information
- Location: Tola Narganjo, Jamui district, Bihar; India
- Coordinates: 24.74394°N 86.45757°E
- System: Indian Railways station
- Owner: Indian Railways
- Operator: Eastern Railway
- Line: Asansol–Patna section of Howrah–Delhi main line
- Platforms: 2
- Tracks: Broad gauge

Construction
- Structure type: Standard (on ground station)
- Parking: No

Other information
- Status: Active
- Station code: NRGO
- Zone(s): Eastern Railway
- Division(s): Asansol
- Classification: HG-2

History
- Electrified: 1996–97
- Former names: East Indian Railway
Route map
Location
- Location within Bihar
- Interactive map

Narganjo Halt railway station (station code: NRGO) is a railway station on Howrah–New Delhi main line operated by Eastern Railway zone of Indian Railways under Asansol Division. It is situated in Tola Narganjo in Jamui district in the Indian state of Bihar. The station is known for its scenic hilly surroundings and forested landscape. The area was previously heavily affected by Maoist insurgency.

== Facilities ==
The station has two platforms, multiple waiting sheds, a ticket counter and a foot overbridge. Only MEMU and passenger trains have scheduled halts at the station.
