= Kumrabad Rohini railway station =

Railway station in Deoghar district, Jharkhand, India

KUMRABAD ROHINI

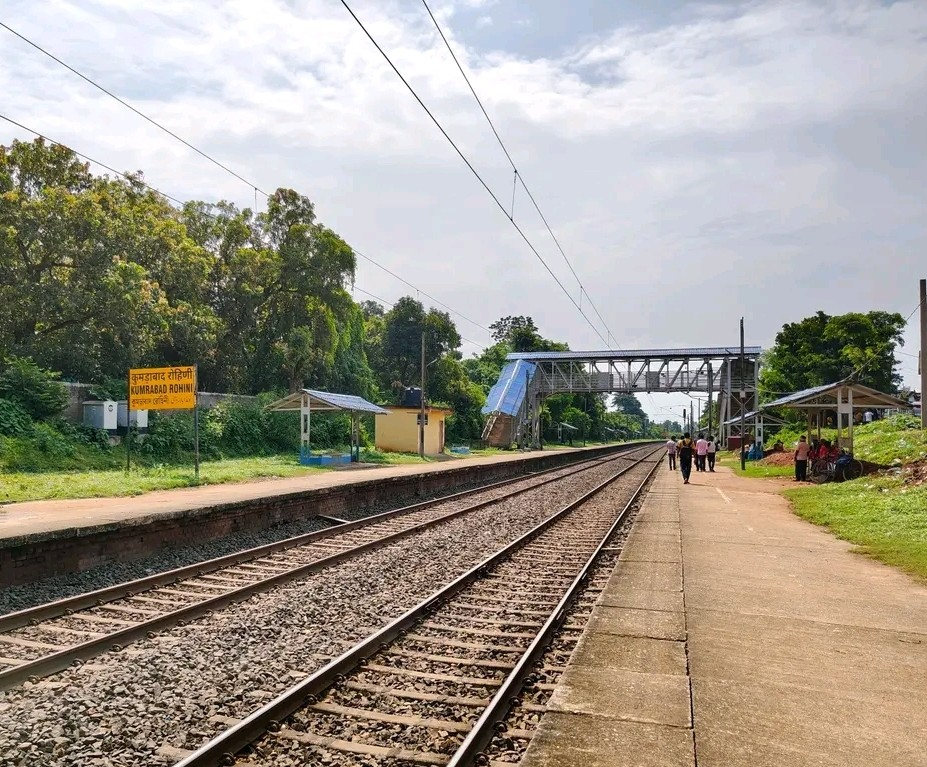

General information
- Location: Kumrabad Rohini, Deoghar district, Jharkhand; India
- Coordinates: 24.4757799°N 86.6433576°E
- Elevation: 253 metres (830 ft)
- System: Indian Railways station
- Owner: Indian Railways
- Operator: Eastern Railway
- Line: Asansol–Patna section of Howrah–Delhi main line
- Platforms: 2
- Tracks: Broad gauge

Construction
- Structure type: Standard (on ground station)
- Parking: No

Other information
- Status: Active
- Station code: KBQ
- Zone(s): Eastern Railway
- Division(s): Asansol
- Classification: NSG-6

History
- Electrified: 1996–97
- Former names: East Indian Railway
Route map
Location
- Location within Jharkhand Location within India
- Interactive map of Kumrabad Rohini

Kumrabad Rohini railway station (station code: KBQ) is a railway station on the Howrah–Delhi main line under the Asansol railway division of the Eastern Railway zone. The station serves Rohini and its nearby villages and it's situated between Jasidih and Shankarpur railway station of Deoghar district of Jharkhand, India.

== Facilities ==
The station consists of two platforms. It is equipped with a foot overbridge, a ticket counter and a drinking water facility. The station is served by all local trains, with limited stoppages for express trains.

Further construction work is planned, including the extension of platforms to handle longer trains.

== See also ==
- Asansol railway division
- Eastern Railway zone
- Howrah–Delhi main line
- Asansol–Patna section
