= Simultala railway station =

Railway station in Jamui district, Bihar, India

SIMULTALA
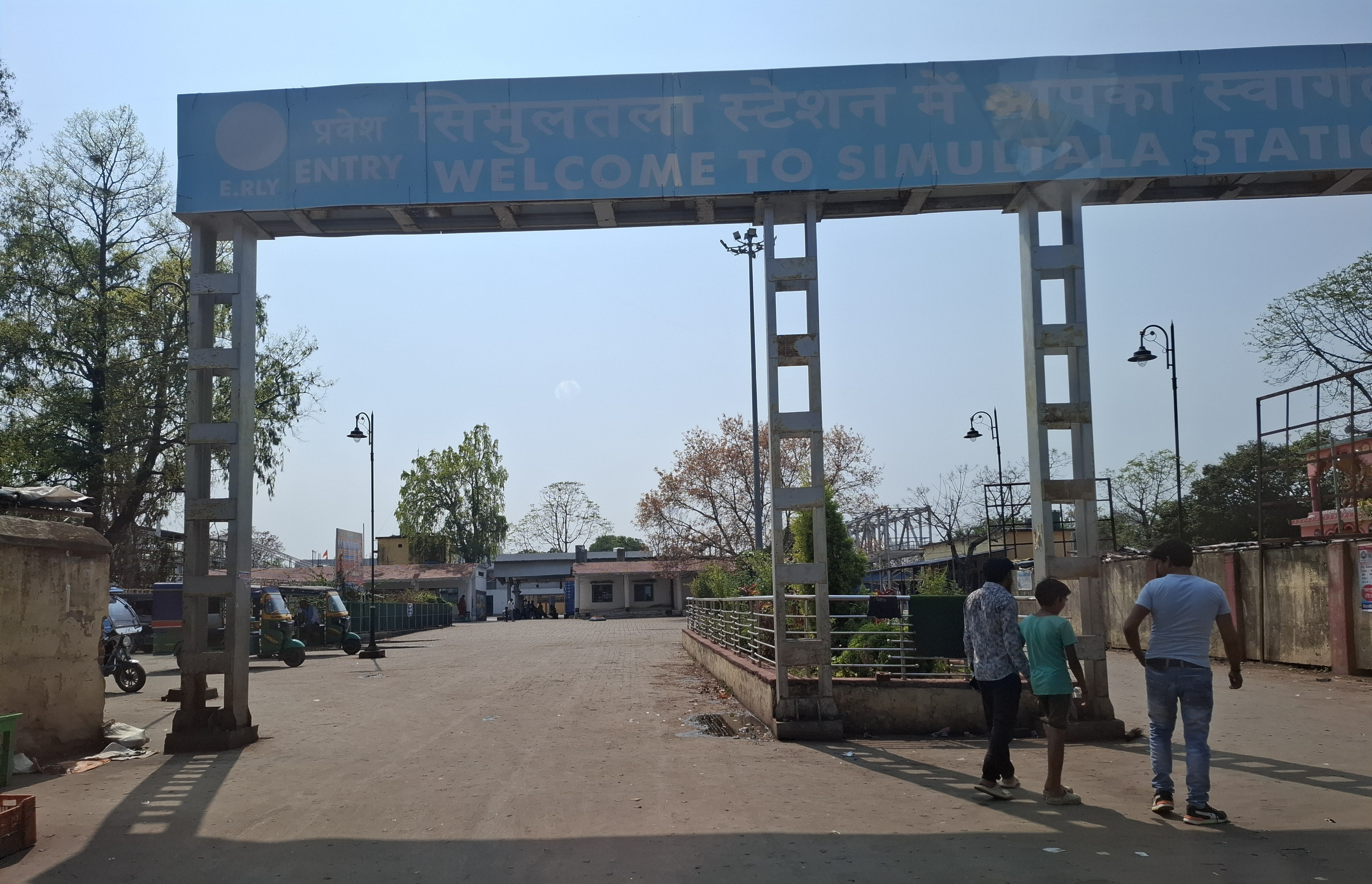
- Simultala railway station entrance

General information
- Location: Simultala, Jamui district, Bihar; India
- Coordinates: 24.7135657°N 86.5422359°E
- Elevation: 242 metres (794 ft)
- System: Indian Railways station
- Owner: Indian Railways
- Operator: Eastern Railway
- Line: Howrah–Delhi main line
- Platforms: 2
- Tracks: Broad gauge

Construction
- Structure type: Standard (on ground station)
- Parking: No

Other information
- Status: Active
- Station code: STL
- Zone(s): Eastern Railway
- Division(s): Asansol
- Classification: NSG-5

History
- Electrified: 1996–97
- Former names: East Indian Railway
Route map
Location
- Location within Bihar
- Interactive map

Simultala railway station (station code: STL) is a railway station on the Howrah–Delhi main line under the Asansol railway division of the Eastern Railway zone. The station serves Simultala and its nearby areas and it's situated between Telwa Bazar Halt and Ghorparan railway station of Jamui district of Bihar, India. Both Express and EMU trains have scheduled halts here.

== Facilities ==
The station has two platforms, which are linked by a foot overbridge. Basic passenger facilities include a ticket counter, platform sheds and a drinking water supply. However the station is being redeveloped under the Amrit Bharat Station Scheme. Upon completion, Simultala will feature upgraded platforms, new foot overbridges, lifts, escalators, improved waiting rooms, dormitory and enhanced passenger amenities comparable to those at major railway stations.

== See also ==
- Asansol railway division
- Eastern Railway zone
- Howrah–Delhi main line
