= Mathurapur railway station =

Railway station in Jharkhand, India

MATHURAPUR

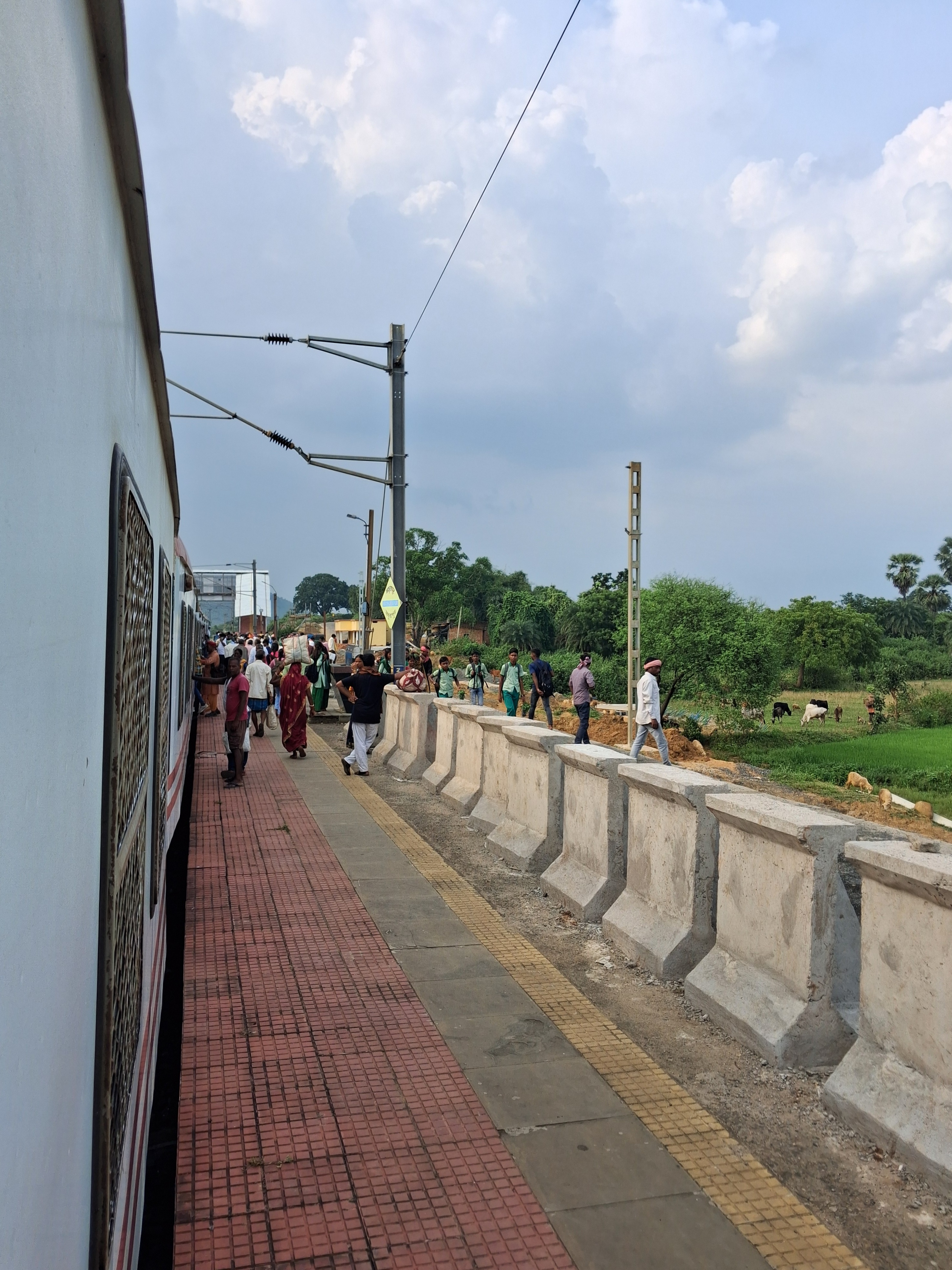

General information
- Location: Mathurapur, Karmatanr, Deoghar District, Jharkhand; India
- Coordinates: 24.36240°N 86.63511°E
- Elevation: 260 metres (850 ft)
- System: Indian Railways station
- Owner: Indian Railways
- Operator: Eastern Railway
- Line: Asansol–Patna section of Howrah–Delhi main line
- Platforms: 2
- Tracks: Broad gauge

Construction
- Structure type: Standard (on ground station)
- Parking: No

Other information
- Status: Active
- Station code: MUW
- Zone(s): Eastern Railway
- Division(s): Asansol
- Classification: NSG-6

History
- Electrified: 1996–97
- Former names: East Indian Railway
Route map
Location
- Location within Jharkhand
- Interactive map

Mathurapur railway station (station code: MUW) is a railway station on the Howrah–Delhi main line in Deoghar district, Jharkhand. It comes under the Asansol railway division of the Eastern Railway zone. The station serves Karmatanr and its surrounding rural areas such as Daugi, Tilaia, Dhabwa, Jamunia, Parbatpur, Domnatanr and several other nearby villages. Only passenger and MEMU trains have scheduled halts here.

== Facilities ==
The station has two platforms, which are linked by a foot overbridge. More new platforms are being constructed. Basic facilities for passengers include a ticket counter, platform shelters, and a drinking water point. However, amenities such as dedicated waiting halls or retiring rooms are not available at the station. But new station amenities are being constructed soon with new station building being the first in the link.

== Trains ==
Only a limited number of local, passenger a couple of express trains halt here. These include:

- Howrah–Mokama Express (13029/13030)
- Asansol–Jasidih MEMU (63561/63563)
- Andal–Jasidih MEMU (63545/63546)
- Barddhaman–Jhajha MEMU (63509/63510)
- Baidyanathdham–Asansol MEMU (63562)
- Jasidih–Asansol MEMU (63564)
- Dumka-Ranchi Express (13319/13320)
- Patliputra Express (18621/18622)

== See also ==
- Asansol railway division
- Eastern Railway zone
- Howrah–Delhi main line
- Asansol–Patna section
