= Shankarpur railway station =

Railway station in Jharkhand, India

SHANKARPUR

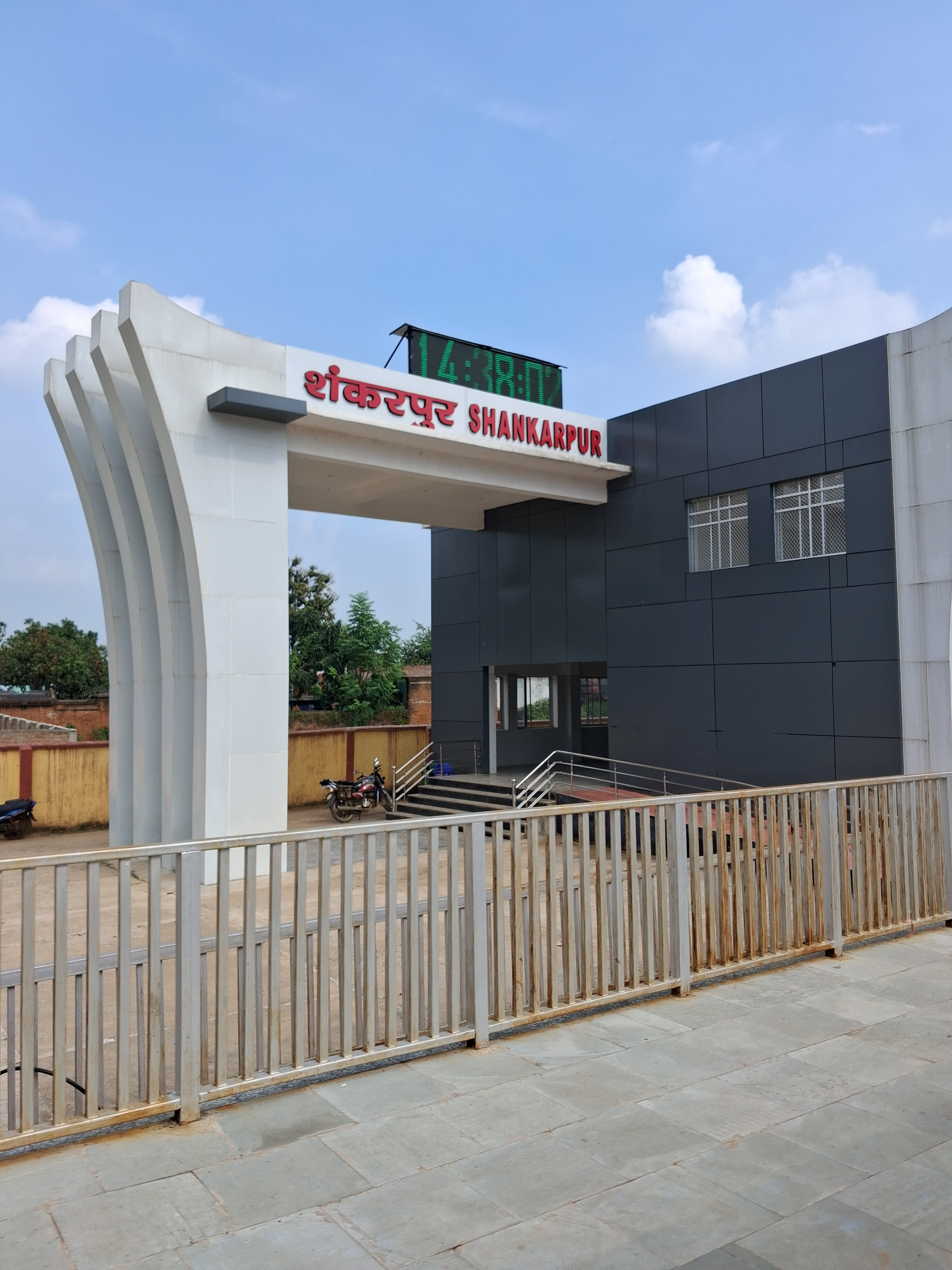

General information
- Location: Sankarpur, Deoghar District, Jharkhand; India
- Coordinates: 24.44204°N 86.63772°E
- Elevation: 235 metres (771 ft)
- System: Indian Railways station
- Owner: Indian Railways
- Operator: Eastern Railway
- Line: Asansol–Patna section of Howrah–Delhi main line
- Platforms: 2
- Tracks: Broad gauge
- Connections: Auto stand

Construction
- Structure type: At-grade
- Parking: Yes
- Accessible: Available

Other information
- Status: Active
- Station code: SNQ
- Zone(s): Eastern Railway
- Division(s): Asansol
- Classification: NSG-6

History
- Electrified: 1996–97
- Former names: East Indian Railway
Route map
Location
- Location within Jharkhand
- Interactive map

Shankarpur railway station (station code: SNQ) is a railway station on the Howrah–Delhi main line in Deoghar district, Jharkhand. It comes under the Asansol railway division of the Eastern Railway zone. The station serves Sankarpur and its surrounding areas such as Devipur, Tiljori, Rampur and several other nearby villages. It is the closest railway station to AIIMS, Deoghar. Only passenger and MEMU trains have scheduled halts here.

== Facilities ==
Shankarpur railway station consists of three platforms connected by a foot overbridge. Basic amenities available for passengers include a ticket counter, covered platform sheds, seating arrangements and drinking water facilities.

As part of Amrit Bharat Station Scheme, the station underwent major redevelopment and upgradation in 2025. The redevelopment work included a 437 square metre renovated platform shelter, 2000 square metres of renewed platform surfacing, installation of an electronic information display system, upgraded toilets and ramps to improve accessibility for disabled passengers. A washing pit is also planned for upcoming future.

== Trains ==
Only a limited number of passenger and local suburban trains halt here. These include:

- Howrah–Mokama Express (13029/13030)
- Asansol–Jasidih MEMU (63561/63563)
- Andal–Jasidih MEMU (63545/63546)
- Barddhaman–Jhajha MEMU (63509/63510)
- Baidyanathdham–Asansol MEMU (63562)
- Jasidih–Asansol MEMU (63564)
- Patliputra Express (18621/18622)
- Ranchi Intercity Express (13319/13320)

== See also ==
- Asansol railway division
- Eastern Railway zone
- Howrah–Delhi main line
- Asansol–Patna section
