= Kundri Sankurha =

Village in Bihar, India

Kundri Sankurha is a village in Jamui district, Bihar, India.
