= KBQ =

KBQ or kbq may refer to:

- KBQ, the IATA airport code for Kasungu Airport, Malawi
- KBQ, the Indian Railways station code for Kumrabad Rohini railway station, Jharkhand, India
- kbq, the ISO 639-3 code for Kamano language, Eastern Highlands Province, Papua New Guinea
