= Joramow railway station =

Railway station in Deoghar district, Jharkhand, India

JORAMOW

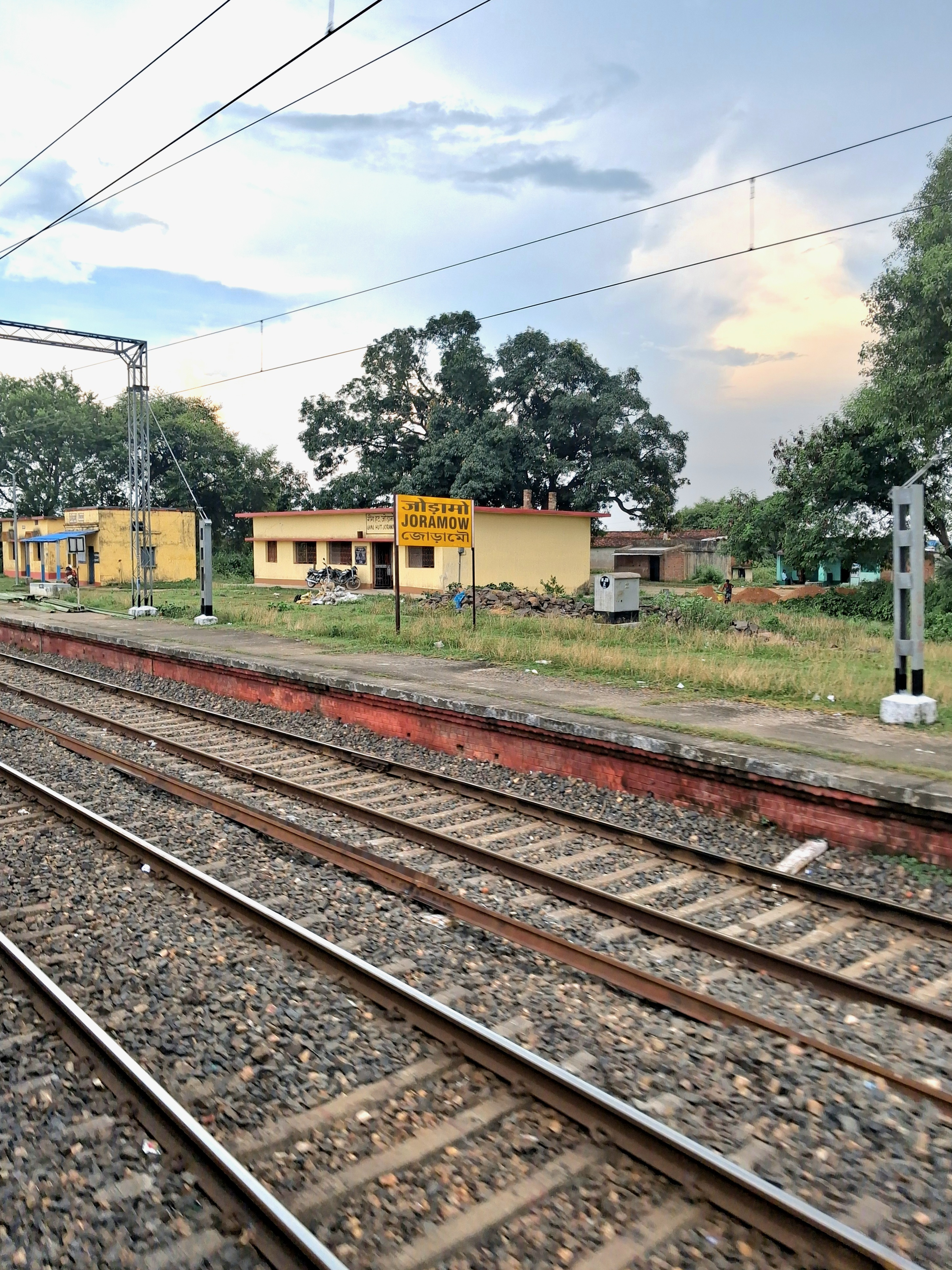

General information
- Location: Joramow, Deoghar District, Jharkhand; India
- Coordinates: 24.20397°N 86.70530°E
- Elevation: 208 metres (682 ft)
- System: Indian Railways station
- Owner: Indian Railways
- Operator: Eastern Railway
- Line: Asansol–Patna section of Howrah–Delhi main line
- Platforms: 2
- Tracks: Broad gauge

Construction
- Structure type: Standard (on ground station)
- Parking: No

Other information
- Status: Active
- Station code: JRW
- Zone(s): Eastern Railway
- Division(s): Asansol
- Classification: HG-2

History
- Electrified: 1996–97
- Former names: East Indian Railway
Route map
Location
- Location within Jharkhand
- Interactive map

Joramow railway station (station code: JRW) is a railway station on the Howrah–Delhi main line in Deoghar district, Jharkhand. It comes under the Asansol railway division of the Eastern Railway zone. The station serves Joramow and its surrounding rural areas such as Nayachak, Gajiyadih, Harhaja, and several nearby villages. Only passenger and MEMU trains have scheduled halts here.

== Facilities ==
The station consists of two platforms connected by a foot overbridge. It has a ticket counter and platform sheds for passengers waiting for trains. A drinking water facility is also available. The station lacks advanced amenities such as waiting rooms or retiring rooms.

== Trains ==
Several passenger and MEMU trains halt at Joramow railway station. Important trains include:

- Howrah–Mokama Express (13029/13030)
- Asansol–Jasidih MEMU (63561/63563)
- Andal–Jasidih MEMU (63545/63546)
- Barddhaman–Jhajha MEMU (63509/63510)
- Baidyanathdham–Asansol MEMU (63562)
- Jasidih–Asansol MEMU (63564)

== See also ==
- Asansol railway division
- Eastern Railway zone
- Howrah–Delhi main line
- Asansol–Patna section
