= Mehsoda =

Mehsoda is a small village in Jamui District of Bihar, India.
