= Panagarh railway station =

Railway station in West Bengal, India

PANAGARH

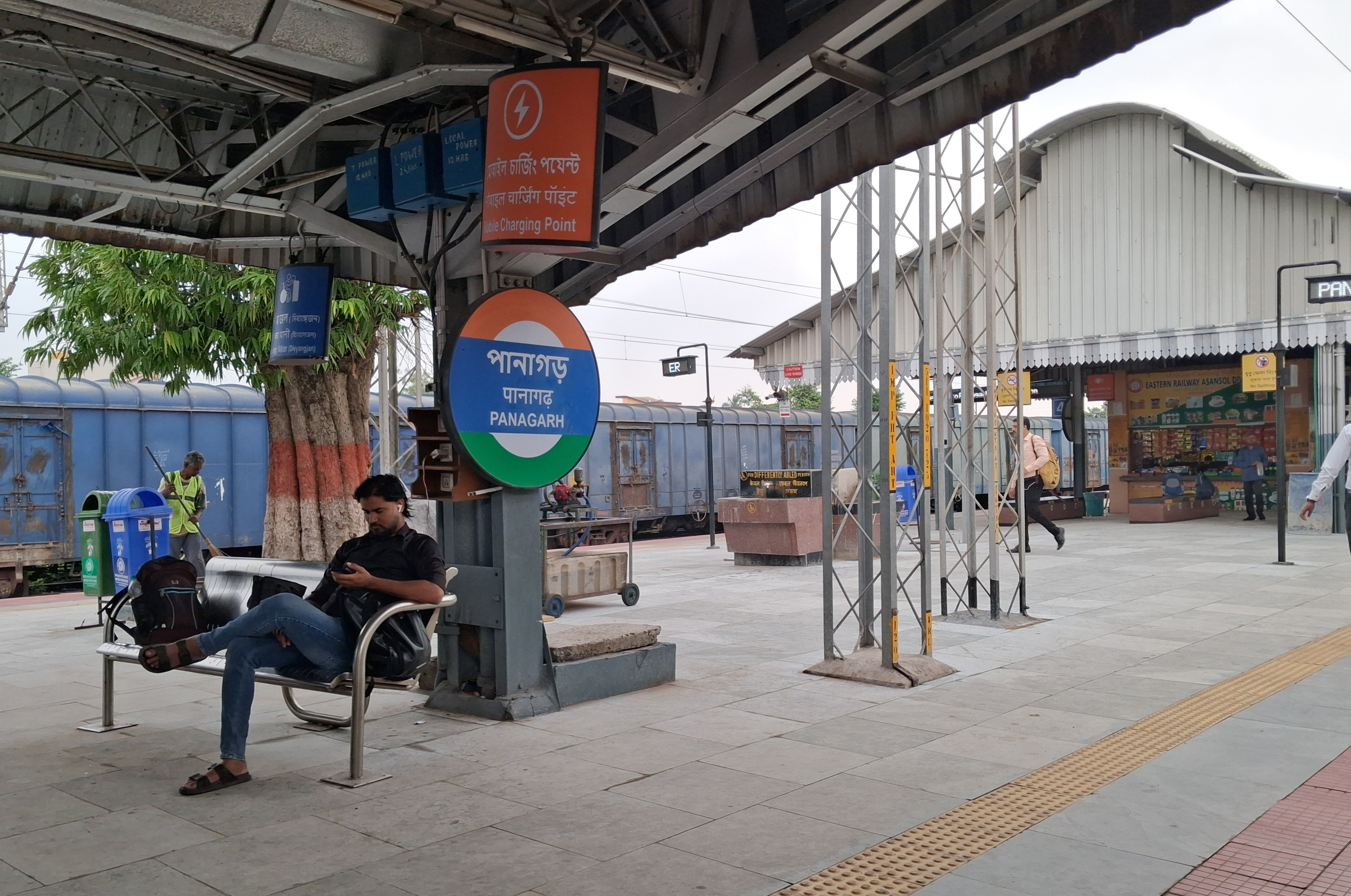

General information
- Location: Panagarh, Paschim Bardhaman district, West Bengal; India
- Coordinates: 24°26′34″N 86°27′33″E
- Elevation: 32 metres (105 ft)
- System: Indian Railways station
- Owner: Indian Railways
- Operator: Eastern Railway
- Lines: Bardhaman–Asansol section Howrah–Delhi main line Howrah–Gaya–Delhi line Howrah–Allahabad–Mumbai line
- Platforms: 4
- Tracks: Broad gauge

Construction
- Structure type: At-grade
- Parking: Yes

Other information
- Status: Functioning
- Station code: PAN
- Zone(s): Eastern Railway
- Division(s): Asansol
- Classification: NSG-5

History
- Opened: 1856
- Electrified: 1960–61
- Former names: East Indian Railway Company
Route map
Location
- Location within West Bengal Location within India
- Interactive map of Panagarh

Panagarh railway station (station code: PAN) is a station on the Bardhaman–Asansol section. The station is located in Paschim Bardhaman district in the Indian state of West Bengal. It serves the town of Panagarh and the surrounding industrial areas, and also provides connectivity to the nearby Panagarh Air Force Station.

== Administration ==
Panagarh railway station falls under the jurisdiction of the Asansol division of the Eastern Railway zone of Indian Railways.

== Trains ==
Panagarh railway station is served by a mix of passenger, MEMU and express trains. Regular MEMU and passenger services connect the station with nearby important stations such as Bardhaman, Durgapur and Asansol.
