= Mugma railway station =

Railway station in Dhanbad district, Jharkhand, India

Mugma
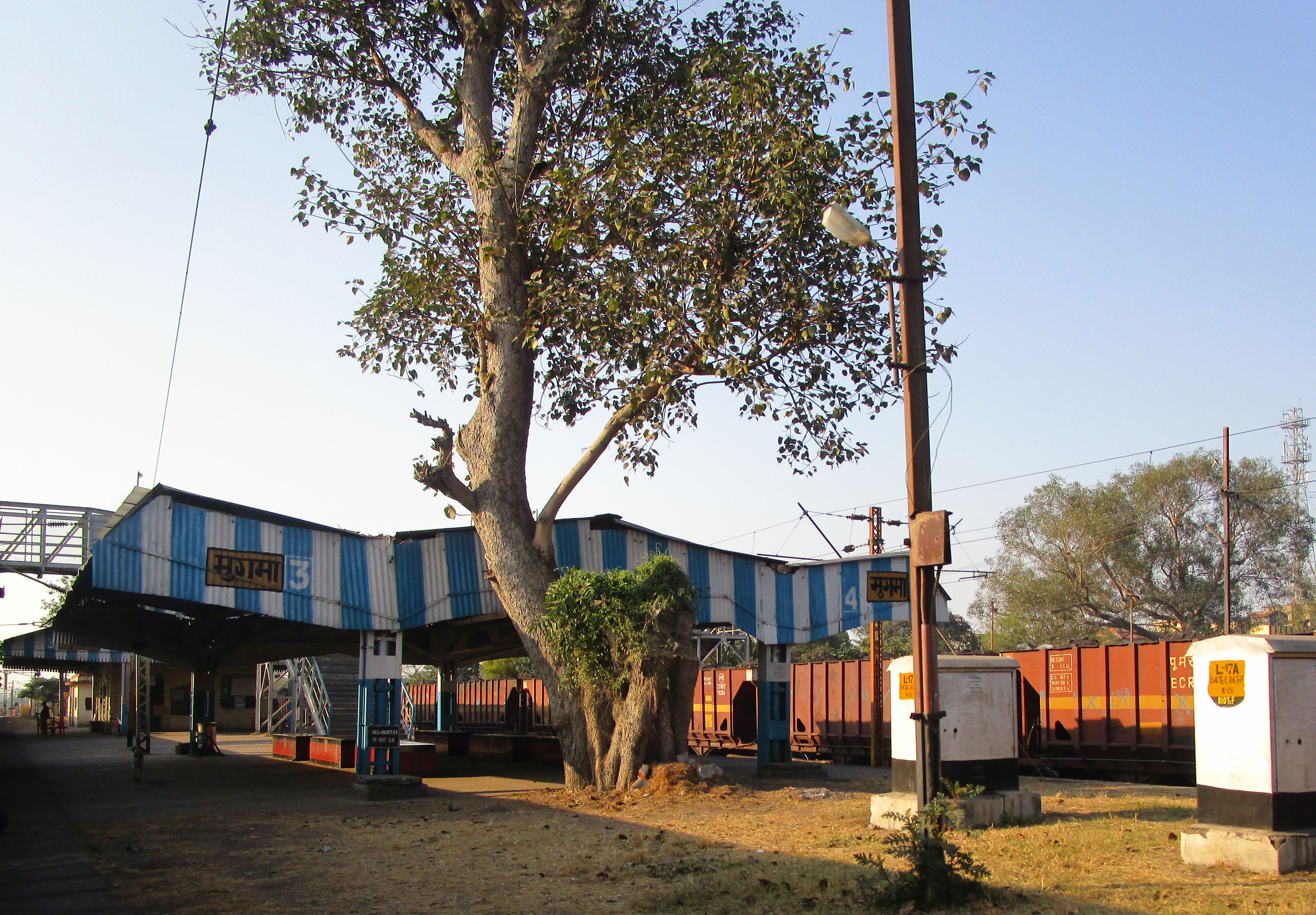

General information
- Location: Mugma, Dhanbad District, Jharkhand; India
- Coordinates: 23.75197°N 86.74832°E
- Elevation: 129 metres (423 ft)
- System: Indian Railways station
- Owner: Indian Railways
- Operator: Eastern Railway
- Line: Howrah–Gaya–Delhi line
- Platforms: 3
- Tracks: Broad gauge

Construction
- Structure type: At-grade
- Parking: No

Other information
- Status: Active
- Station code: MMU
- Zone(s): Eastern Railway
- Division(s): Asansol
- Classification: NSG-6

History
- Electrified: 1960−61
- Former names: East Indian Railway
Route map
- Sources: Google maps; Indian Railway Time Table (Indiarailinfo); Hatia-Bardhaman Passenger 53062; Gomoh-Barkakana Passenger 461EC
Location
- Location within Jharkhand
- Interactive map

Mugma railway station (station code: MMU) is a railway station located in the Dhanbad district of the Indian state of Jharkhand. It falls under the jurisdiction of Asansol division of the Eastern Railway zone of Indian Railways.

== Administration ==
Mugma railway station is administered by the Asansol railway division of the Eastern Railway zone of Indian Railways.

== Trains ==
The station primarily handles MEMU passenger trains and freight traffic. Given its proximity to the Jharia coalfield region, it plays a role in the transportation of coal and related goods.
