= Nagi Dam Bird Sanctuary =

Indian nature site

Nagi Bird Sanctuary
- IUCN category IV (habitat/species management area)
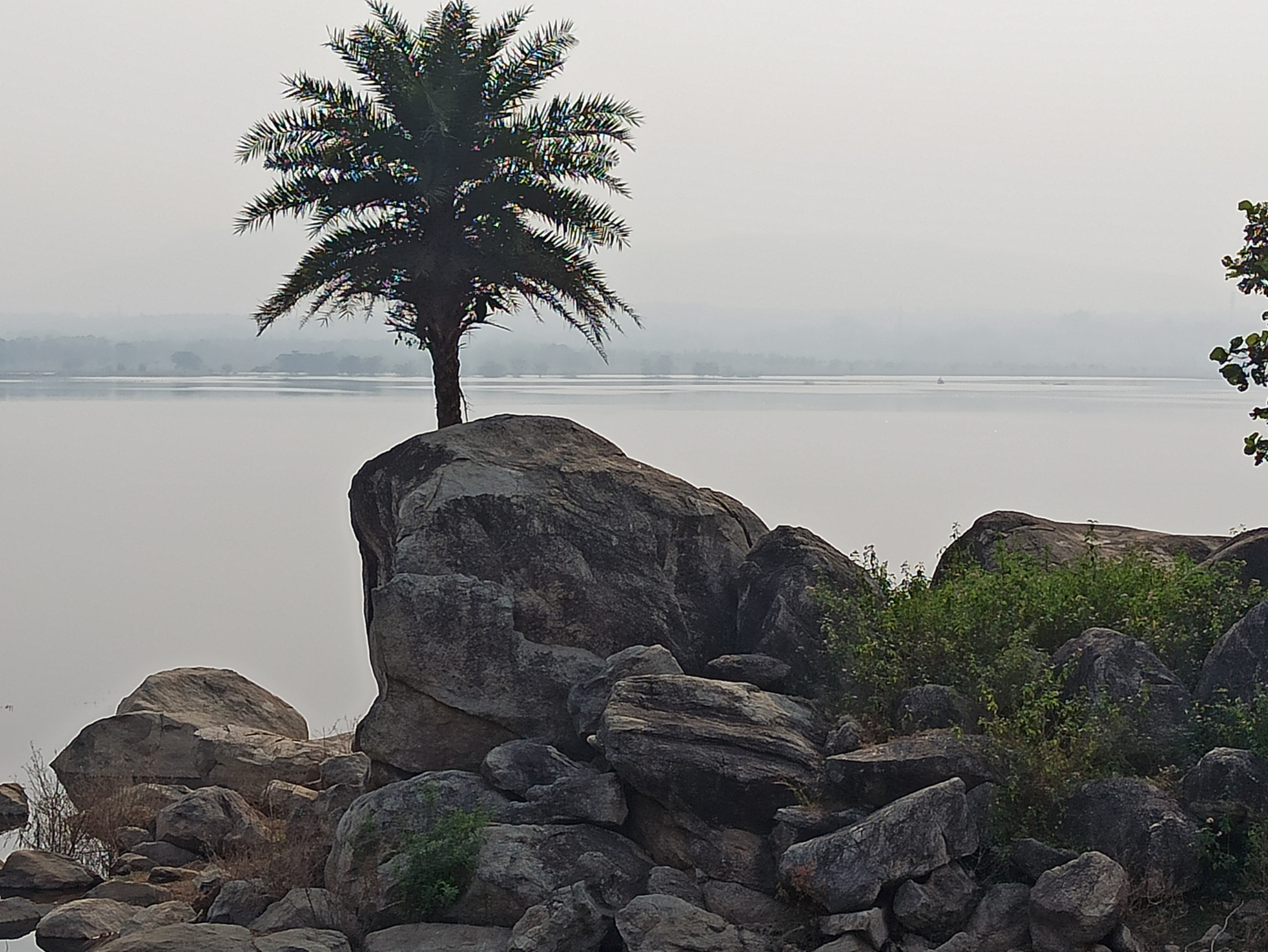
- Landscape of Nagi Bird Sanctuary

- Location within Bihar Location within India
- Interactive map of Nagi Bird Sanctuary
- Location: Jhajha, Bihar, India
- Nearest city: Deoghar
- Coordinates: 24°49′03″N 86°24′00″E
- Area: 207 hectares (510 acres)
- Designation: Important Bird Area
- Created: 1984

Nagi Bird Sanctuary is located in Jhajha Jamui district of south Bihar, near the Jharkhand border. It was declared a bird sanctuary on 25 February 1984 as per Section 18 of the Wildlife (Protection) Act, 1972. The final notification under Section 26A of the act was issued on 4 September 2009. Thousands of migrating birds congregate in the reservoir during the winter season, especially from November to February. The area of the sanctuary is 2.1 square kilometres (0.81 sq mi). It is home to over 133 bird species. There are also a variety of dragonflies, damselflies and butterflies which are yet to be studied and documented. In 2004, Nagi Dam Bird Sanctuary was declared an Important Bird Area (IBA) by BirdLife International. The area overlapping with the IBA is 791 ha.

The sanctuary is located 31 km from Jamui railway station and 12 km from Jhajha railway station. The nearest airport is 200 km away in Patna, although a new airport is coming up at Deoghar in northern Jharkhand. The highly revered Jain pilgrimage site of Lachhuar and temple city of Deoghar are 50 and 80 km away from the sanctuary respectively.

== Landscape ==
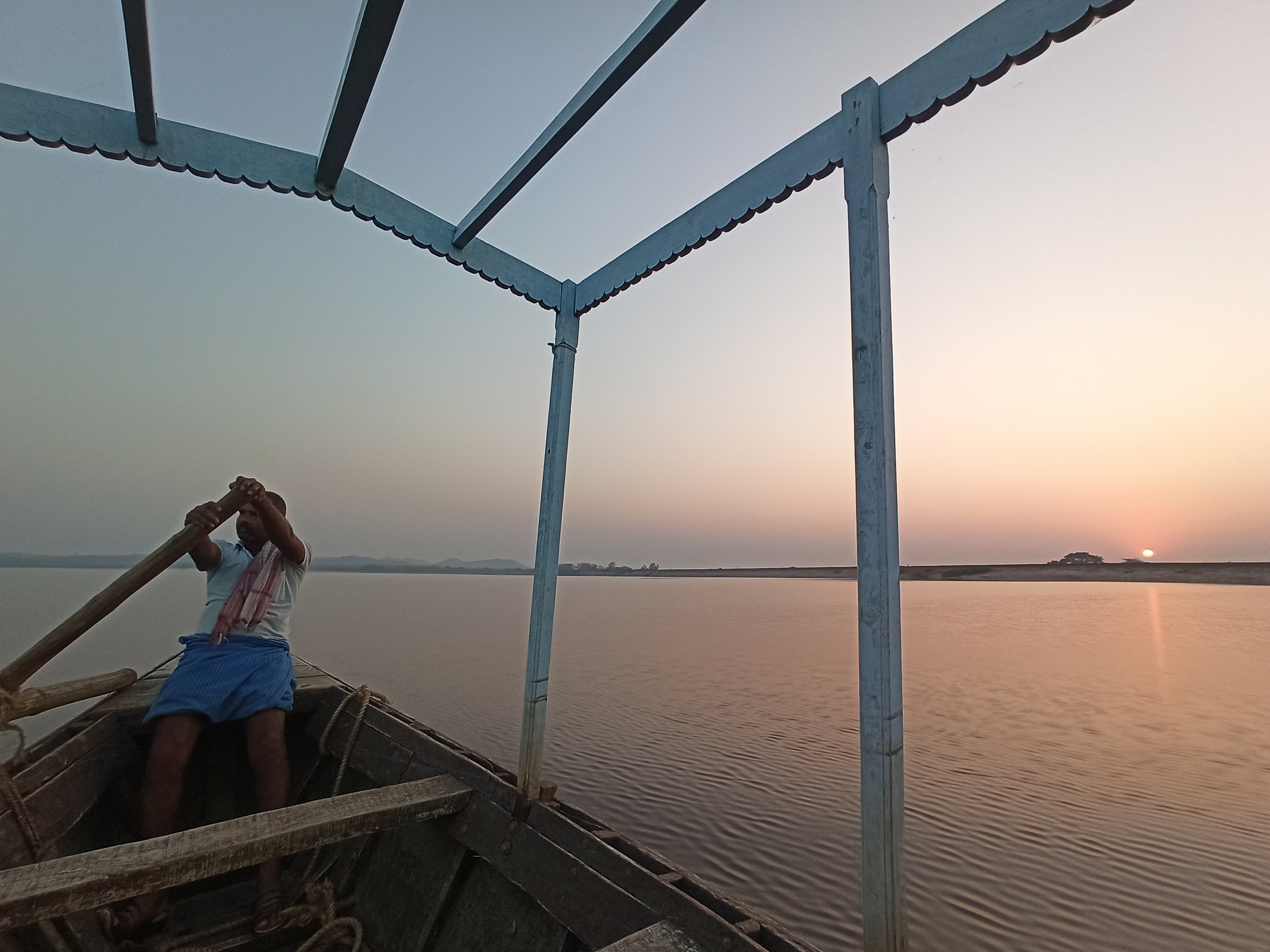
Atmosphere in the sanctuary at sunset

The sanctuary is a gentle plain, gradually sloping to the west. The surrounding terrain is slightly undulating. The elevation is approximately 200 metres above mean sea level. Nagi Dam derives water from the Nagi River and streams like Karma, Tarakura and Gauradangi. The Nagi Dam Bird Sanctuary is surrounded by Kusauna and Kubri village on east, Kathabajara village on west, Baijala and Burikhar village on the north and Belbinjha and Karahra village on the south. The sanctuary is surrounded by undulating peninsular landscape with tor formations on barren land interspersed by rocky outcrops. The water is quite deep with a clear surface. At the edges of the wetland, hydrophytes growing at the bottom can be clearly seen. The dam stores water from the Nagi river and other inlets. It supplies water to agricultural fields downstream. The sanctuary receives an annual rainfall of approximately 66 cm.

== Construction of Nagi Dam ==
The construction of the dam began after recommendation of the Planning Commission under the First Five-Year Plan in 1955 and 1956 for irrigation purposes. It was completed in the Second Five-Year Plan in 1958. The cost of the project was ₹3 crores (₹30,000,000). Nagi Dam was constructed to irrigate about 9850 acres of land. As a result of the construction of Nagi Dam, a sufficient quantity of water gets impounded in the reservoirs during rainy season which is later utilized for irrigation through a canal network running downstream. The reservoir is home to many species of fish, amphibians, birds, reptiles, etc.

== Declaration as Important Bird Area (IBA) ==
=== Criteria for IBA ===
An Important Bird and Biodiversity Area (IBA) is an area identified using an internationally agreed set of criteria as being globally important for the conservation of bird populations. Nagi Dam Bird Sanctuary satisfies IBA criteria of A4i and A4iii for congregations of various species of birds.

=== Population of bar-headed goose beyond threshold ===
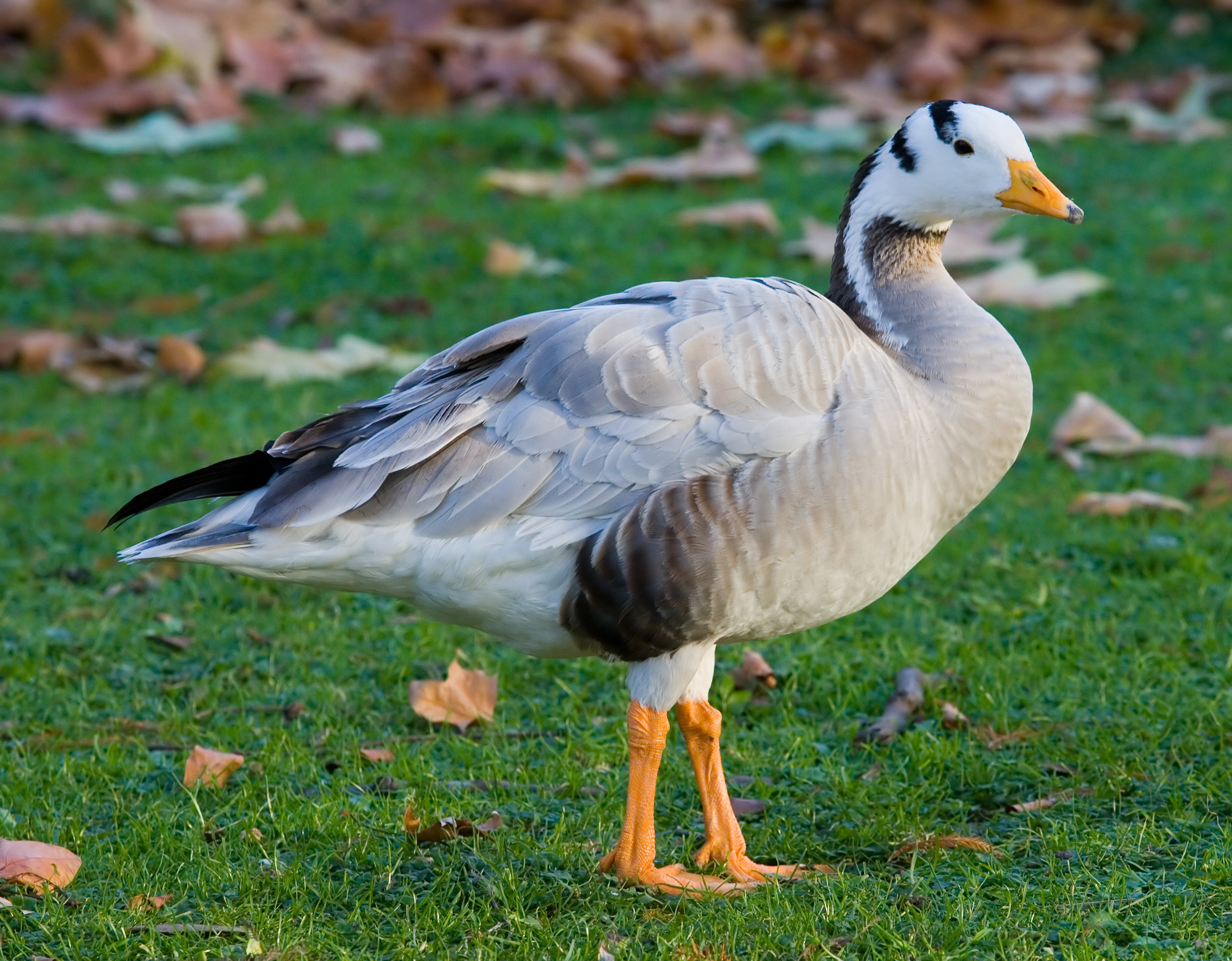
Bar-headed goose

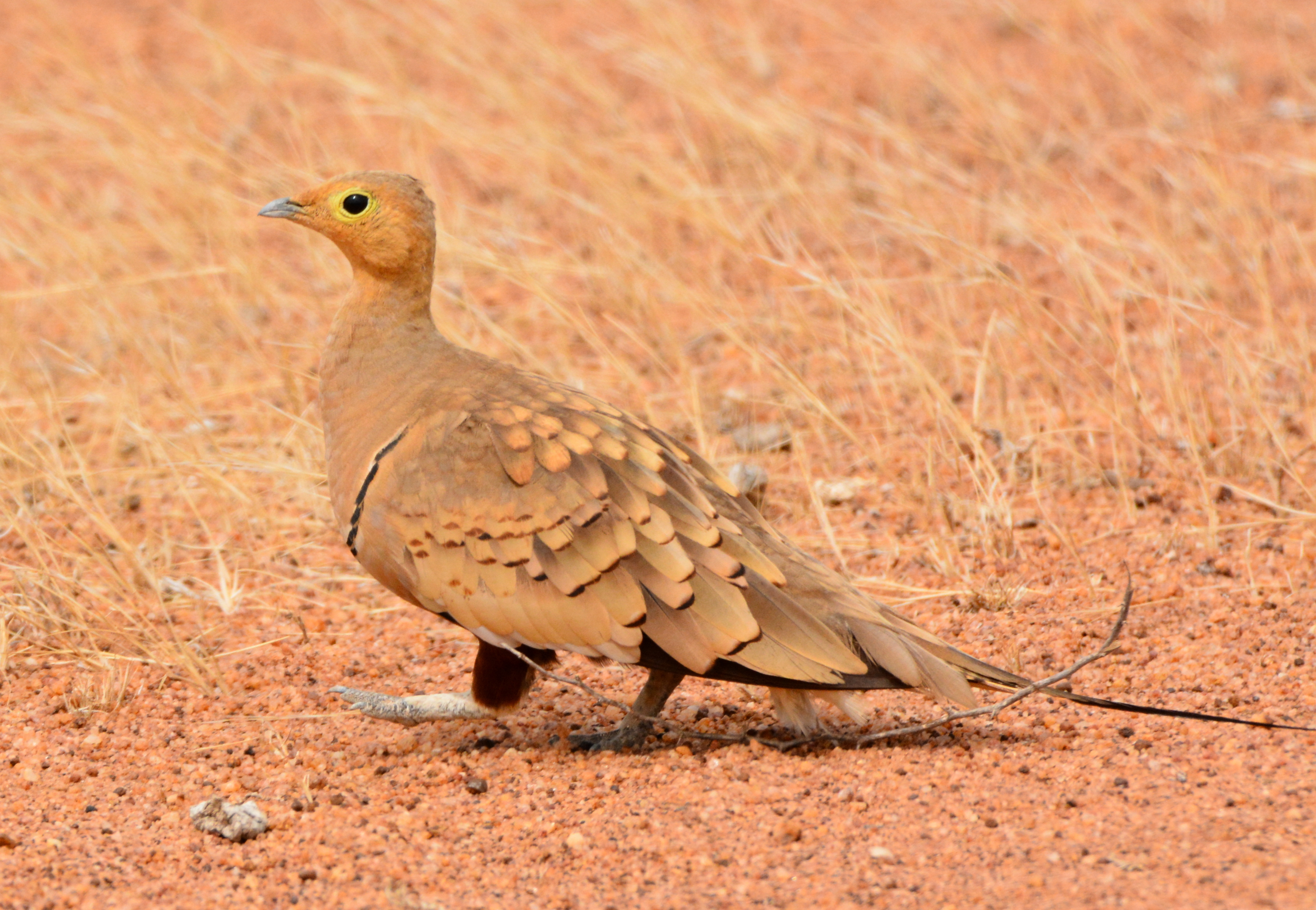
Male sandgrouse

Around 1600 bar-headed geese (Anser indicus) have been recorded from this site. According to Wetlands International (2002), 1% threshold of this species is 560. Hence, about 3% of the global population of bar-headed geese are found at this site. Consequently, Birdlife International declared the bird sanctuary was declared as an Important Bird Area in 2004. Beyond the cultivated areas, the water body is surrounded by rocky terrain. Consequently, dryland birds like the Indian courser (Cursorius coromandelicus), chestnut-bellied sandgrouse (Pterocles exustus), yellow-wattled lapwing (Vanellus malabaricus) and Indian robin (Saxicoloides fulicata) are also seen. The site falls in Biome-12, i.e. Indo-Gangetic Plains, but species of Biome-11 are also sighted. More than 20,000 water birds congregate in and around Nagi Dam Bird Sanctuary in winter. The sanctuary is not only popular for the migrating birds but also resident birds. It also has a rich diversity of aquatic flora and fauna. Irrigation and ground water recharge are also key ecosystem services provided by the wetland.

== Bird diversity ==
=== Migratory birds ===
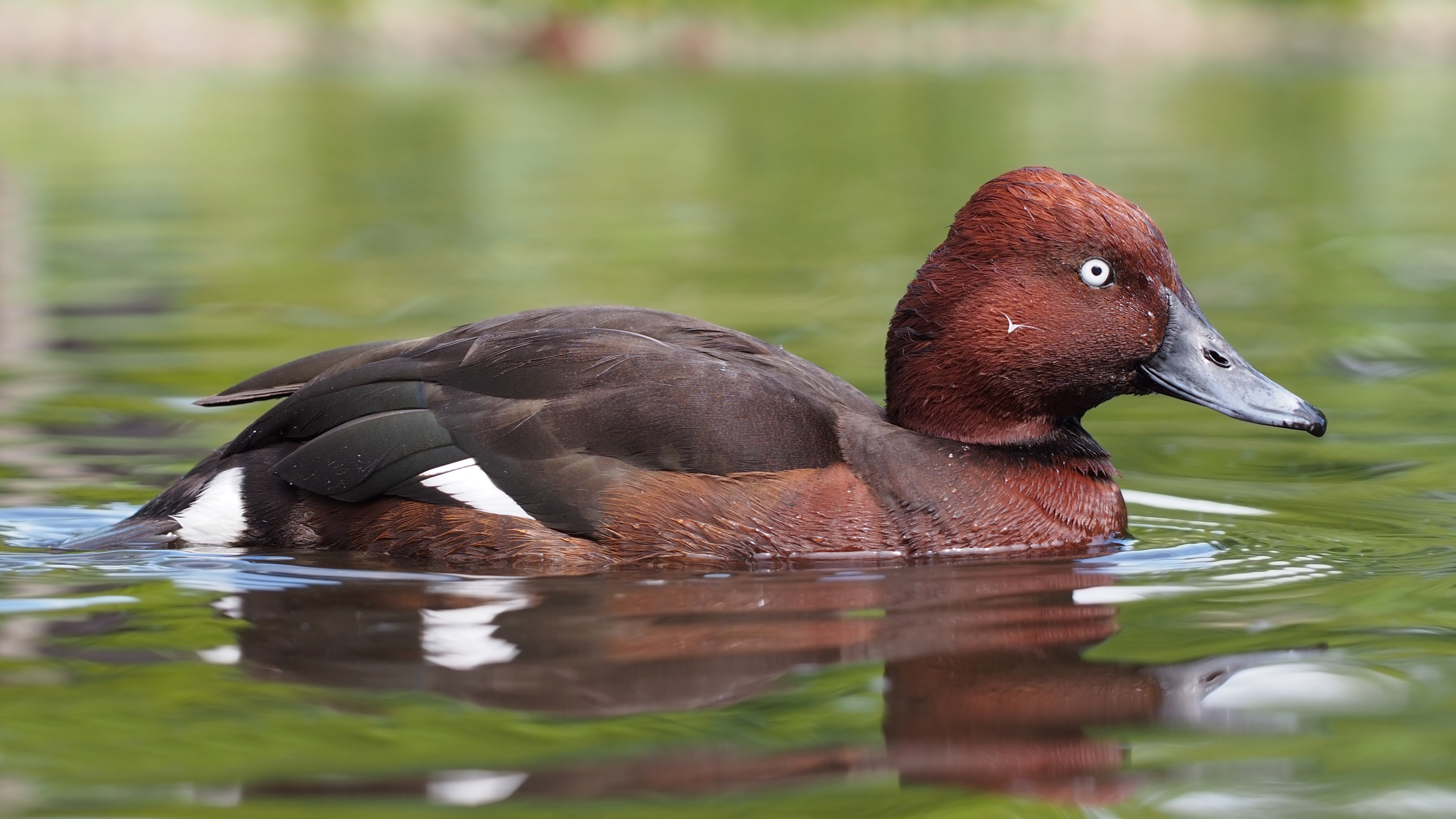
Ferruginous duck

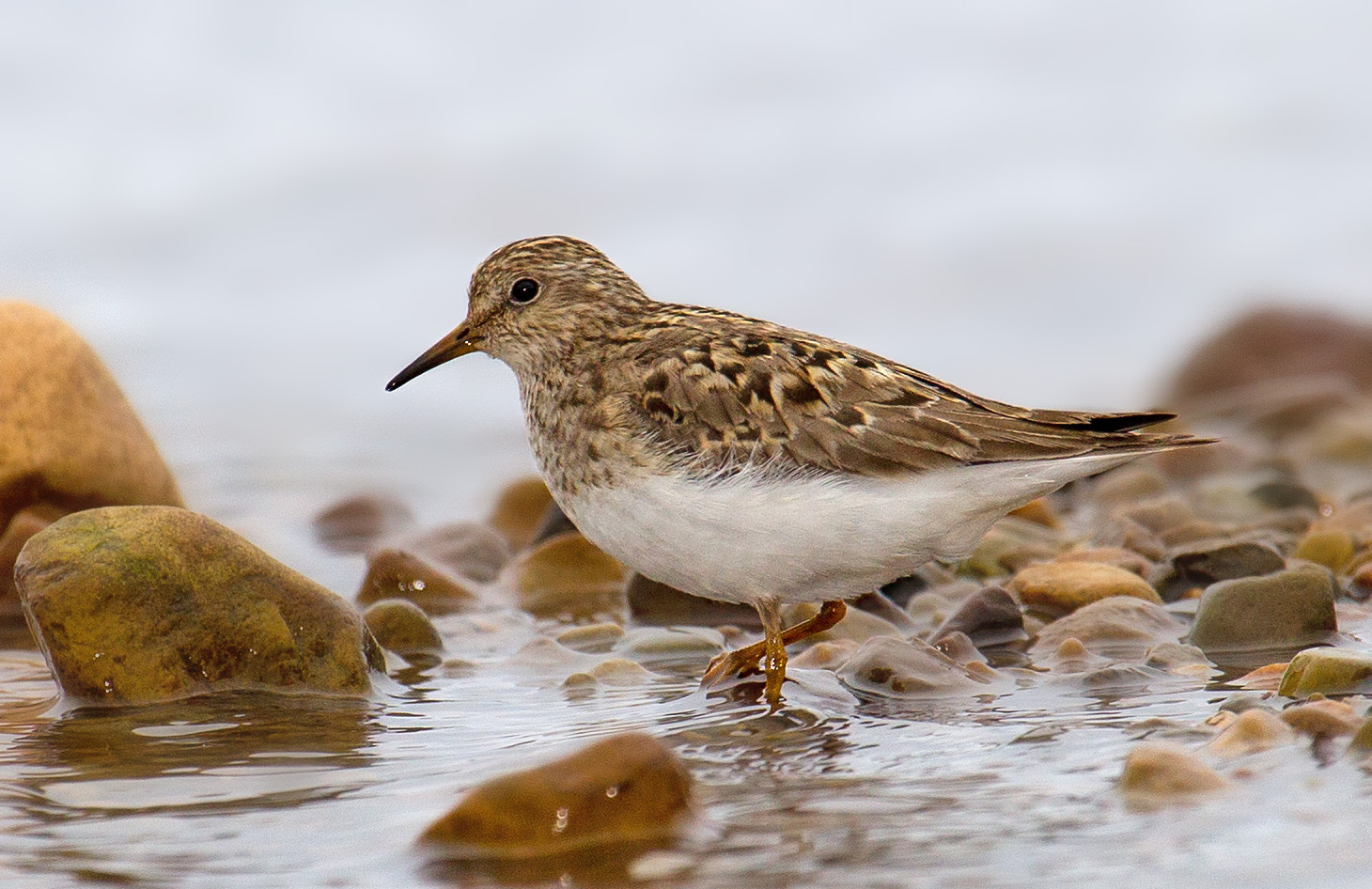
Temminck's stint

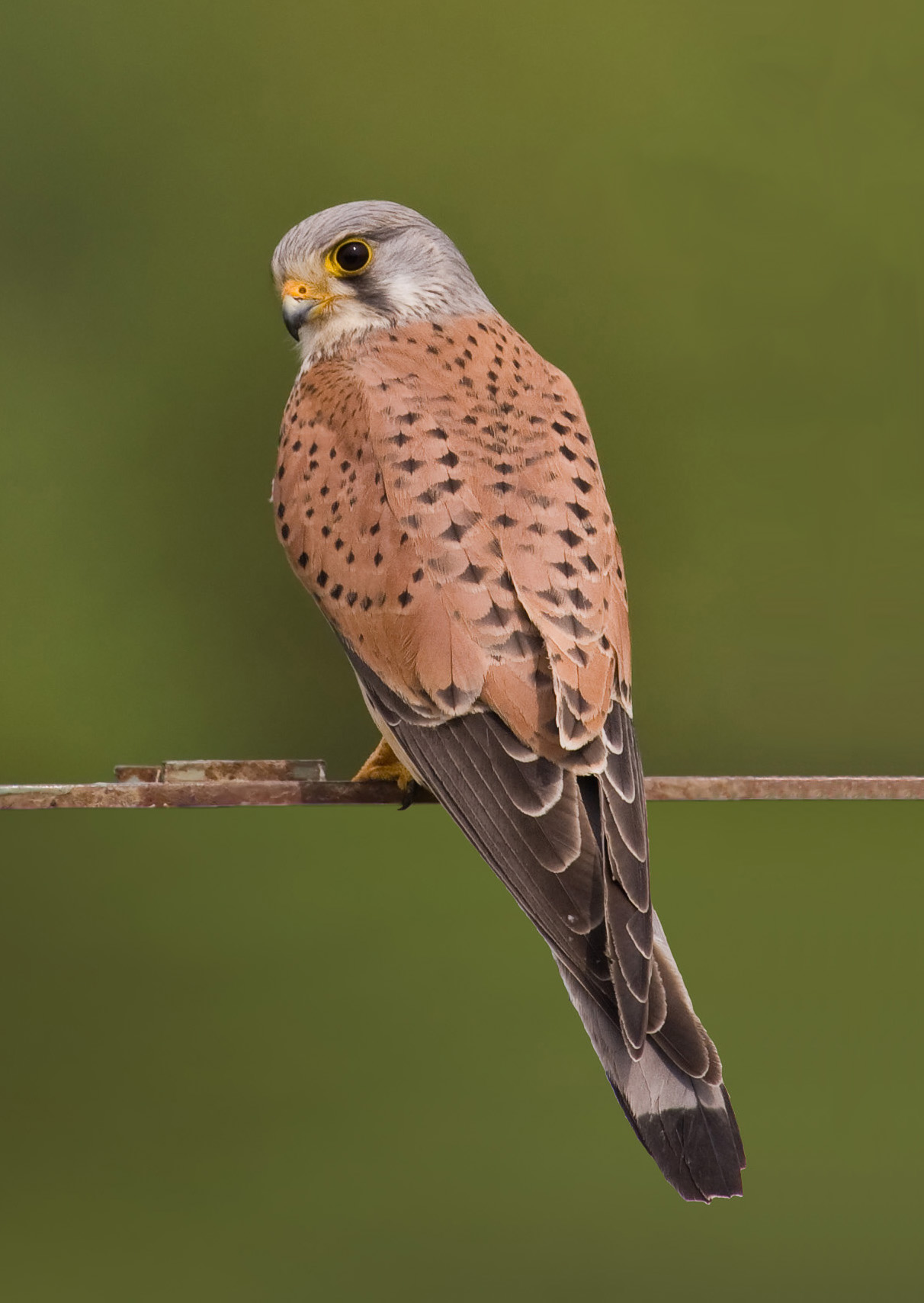
Common kestrel

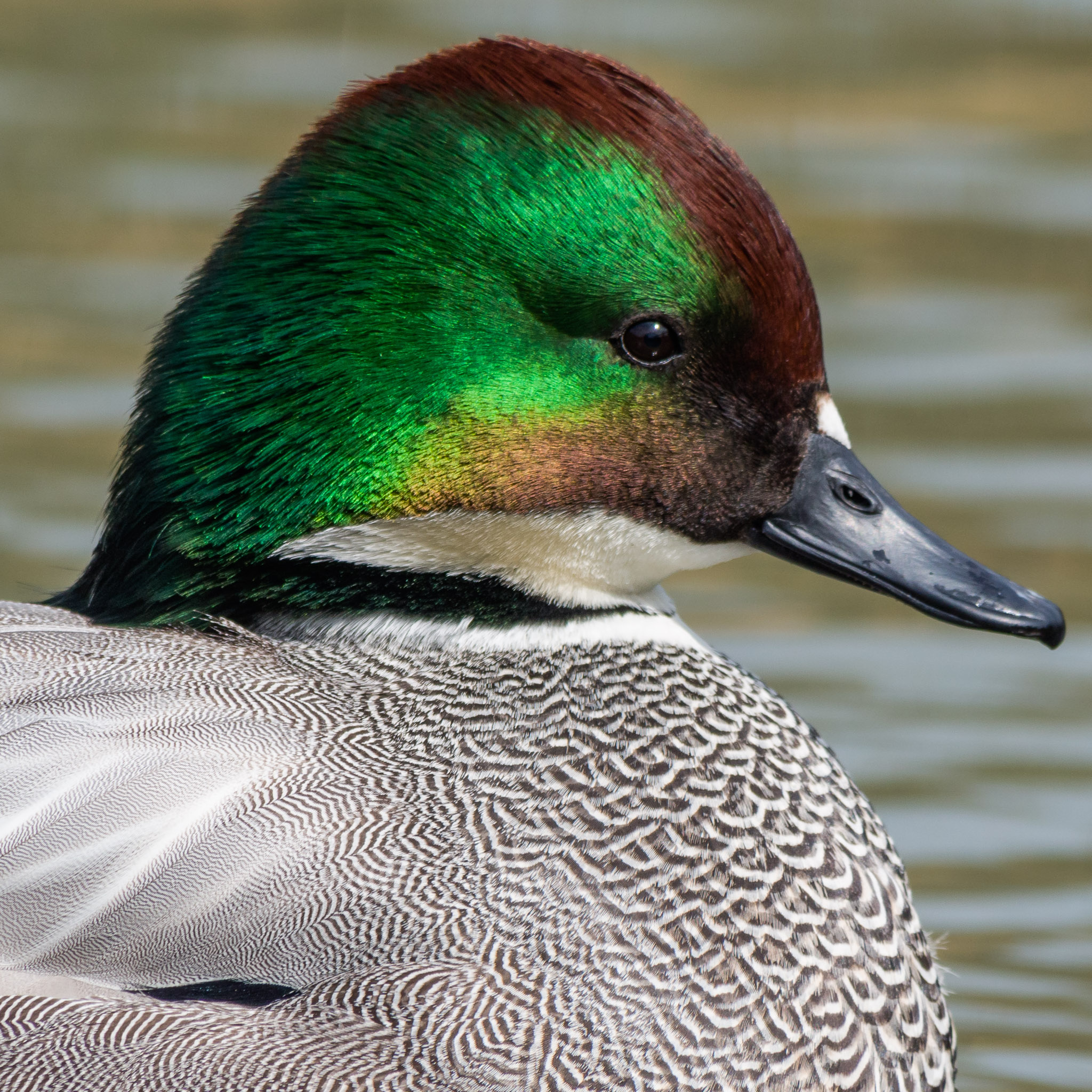
Falcated duck

The arrival of migratory birds begins in October with the coming of white wagtails and black redstarts. Hundreds of Eurasian coots start arriving in the sanctuary in the beginning of November. The sanctuary teems with waterbirds until February, after which the migrants start flying back to their home range in Central Asia, the Arctic Circle, the Russian taiga and northern China.

Migratory birds observed in the sanctuary are Eurasian marsh harrier, greater short-toed lark, mallard, common tern, western yellow wagtail, olive-backed pipit, Richard's pipit, blue rock thrush, common snipe, Blyth's reed warbler, falcated duck, Kentish plover, steppe eagle, Eurasian wigeon, common pochard, greylag goose, tufted duck, northern pintail, ferruginous duck, gadwall, bar-headed goose, red-crested pochard, northern shoveler, ruddy shelduck, black-necked stork, Jacobin cuckoo, common kestrel, barn swallow, brown shrike, brown-headed gull, citrine wagtail, white wagtail, black redstart, red-breasted flycatcher, osprey, great crested grebe, Eurasian coot, little ringed plover, common sandpiper, little stint, Temminck's stint, common greenshank, wood sandpiper and the green sandpiper. The reason for the arrival of a large number of migratory birds is the extent of the wetland and the thriving of aquatic plants, plankton and molluscs in the reservoir. Birds feed on them and also the fish in the wetland.

=== Resident birds ===
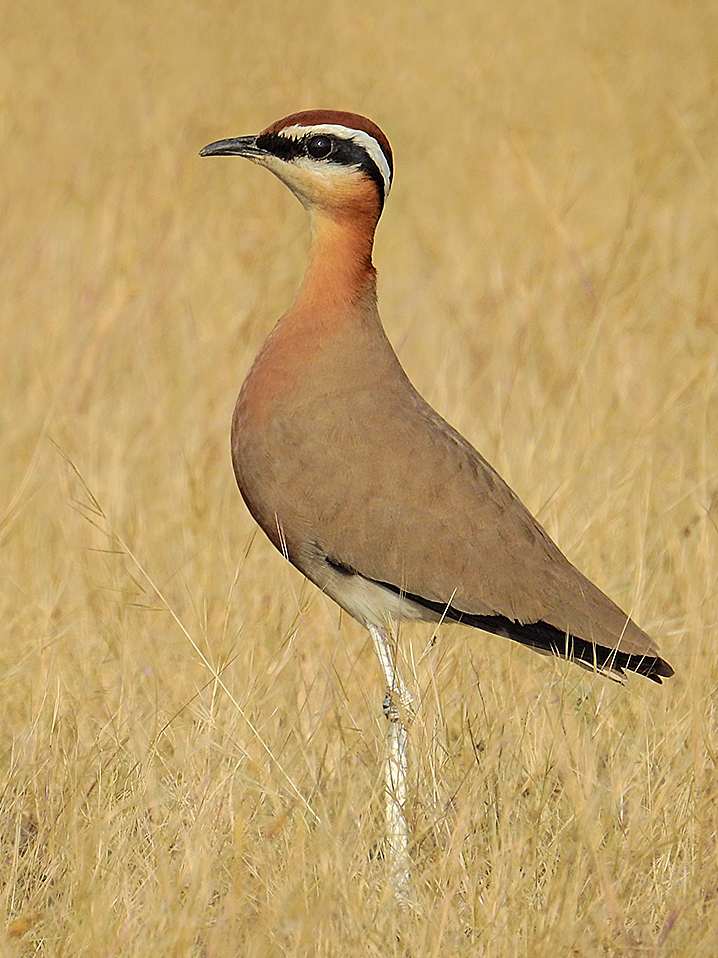
Indian courser

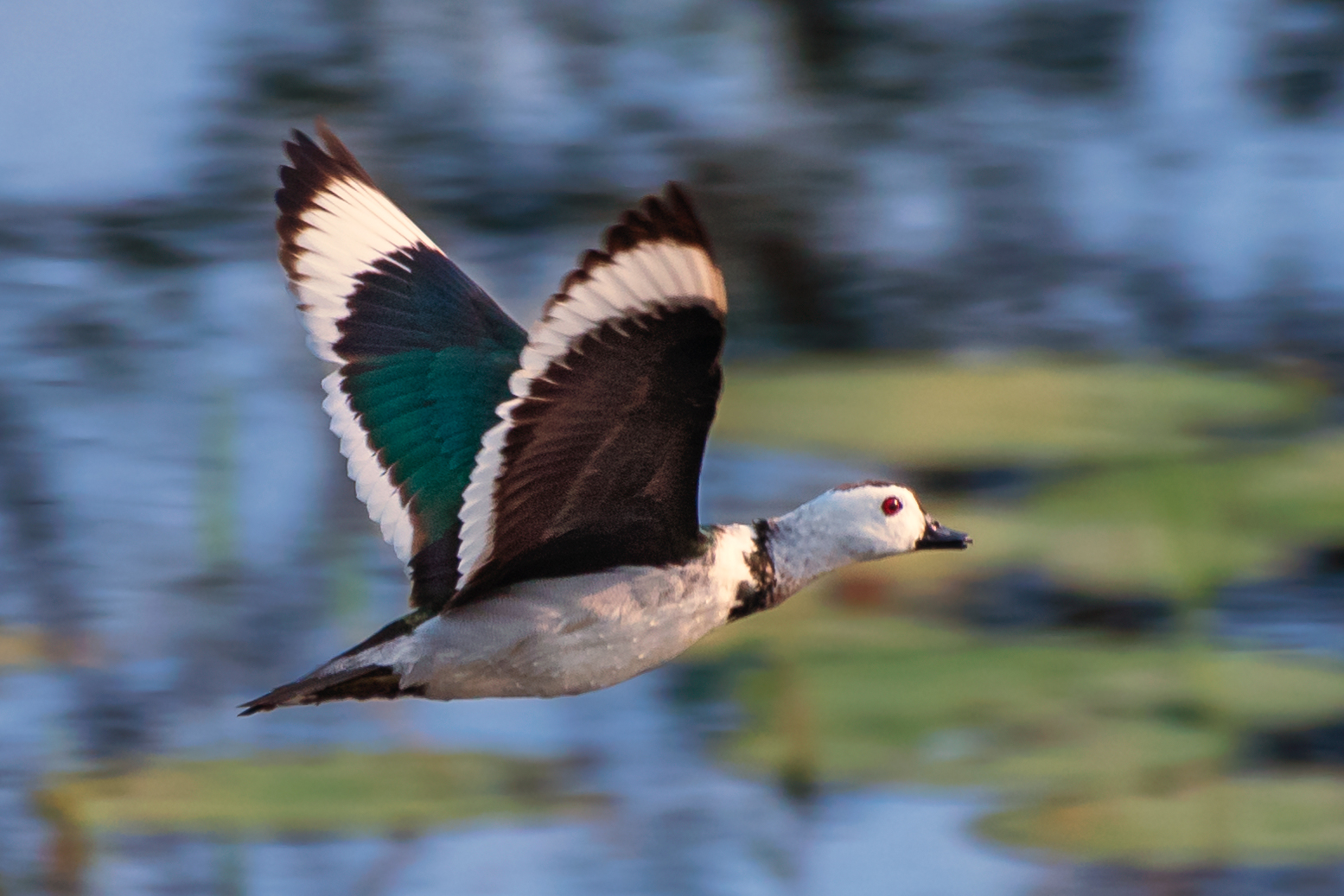
Cotton pygmy goose

Apart from the migratory birds that grace the sanctuary from October to February, a large number of resident birds are present in the summer and monsoon seasons in and around the sanctuary. The wetland provides rich habitat for the resident kingfishers. The paddy fields around the sanctuary provide a rich habitat for insects and dragonflies which are preyed upon by many resident birds. There are many butterflies also present in the sanctuary. The surplus of insects provides a rich hunting habitat for rollers, bee-eaters and munias. The paddy fields provide a rich foraging ground for ibises.

Resident birds of the sanctuary are Indian robin, ashy-crowned sparrow-lark, Asian koel, Asian pied starling, bank myna, baya weaver, black-bellied tern, black drongo, black-headed ibis, black-hooded oriole, black kite, black-winged kite, brahminy starling, bronze-winged jacana, Indian silverbill, Indian roller, cattle egret, brown-headed barbet, house crow, large-billed crow, common hawk cuckoo, common hoopoe, common kingfisher, common myna, white-throated kingfisher, common tailorbird, coppersmith barbet, Eurasian collared dove, spotted dove, rufous treepie, jungle babbler, Asian green bee-eater, gray francolin, Indian grey hornbill, house sparrow, Indian chat, Indian courser, Indian pond heron, cotton pygmy goose, large cuckooshrike, laughing dove, lesser whistling duck, little cormorant, Indian shag, Oriental darter, Oriental magpie robin, red-naped ibis, painted stork, plain prinia, pied kingfisher, purple sunbird, purple heron, grey heron, red-vented bulbul, little grebe, red-wattled lapwing, yellow-wattled lapwing, river tern, rose-ringed parakeet, scaly-breasted munia, shikra, spotted owlet, white-breasted waterhen, Indian thick-knee, yellow-footed green pigeon and the woolly-necked stork.

== Fish diversity ==
The Irrigation Department used to auction fishing in the reservoir. However, since notification as a Bird Sanctuary, fishing has been prohibited. There are over 30 species of fish in the sanctuary like rohu, catla, chanari (ambassisnama) and bulla or tank goby (Glossogobius giuris).

== Threats to biodiversity ==
Agricultural runoff, open defecation, biomass extraction, grazing and illegal fishing are the main threats facing the sanctuary.

== See also ==
- Biodiversity hotspot
- Ecoregions
- International Union for Conservation of Nature
- Key Biodiversity Area
