= Satsang Nagar Halt railway station =

Railway station in Deoghar district, Jharkhand, India

SATSANG NAGAR HALT

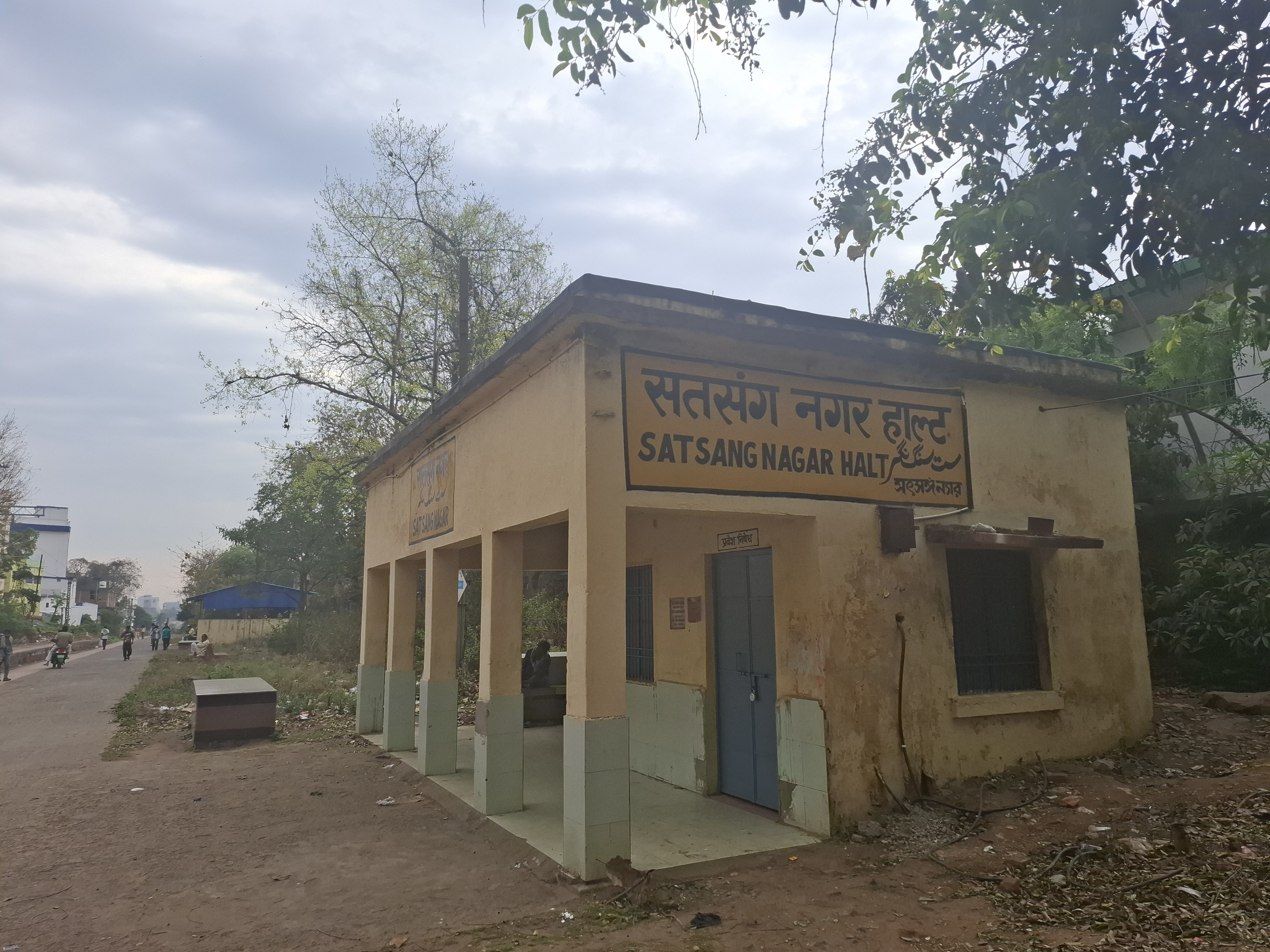
- Satsang Nagar halt railway station

General information
- Location: Satsang, Deoghar, Jharkhand; India
- Coordinates: 24.4906189°N 86.6825668°E
- System: Indian Railways station
- Owner: Indian Railways
- Operator: Eastern Railway
- Line: Jasidih–Baidyanathdham branch line
- Platforms: 1
- Tracks: Broad gauge

Construction
- Structure type: Standard (on ground station)
- Parking: No

Other information
- Status: Active
- Station code: SSNR
- Zone(s): Eastern Railway
- Division(s): Asansol
- Classification: HG-2

History
- Former names: East Indian Railway
Route map
Location
- Location within India Location within Jharkhand
- Interactive map of Satsang Nagar Halt

Satsang Nagar Halt railway station (station code: SSNR) is a railway station on the Jasidih–Baidyanathdham branch line under the Asansol railway division of the Eastern Railway zone. The station is located at Satsang Nagar, Deoghar, and serves passengers traveling to and from the surrounding areas, including the nearby Anukulchandra Satsang Ashram and other parts of the city. Only EMU trains have scheduled halts here.

== Facilities ==
Since the station falls under the halt category, not much development has been carried out. It has only a few waiting rooms, with no foot overbridge, washroom and drinking water facility.

== See also ==
- Asansol railway division
- Eastern Railway zone
