= Asansol railway division =

Railway division of north east India

Asansol Railway Division
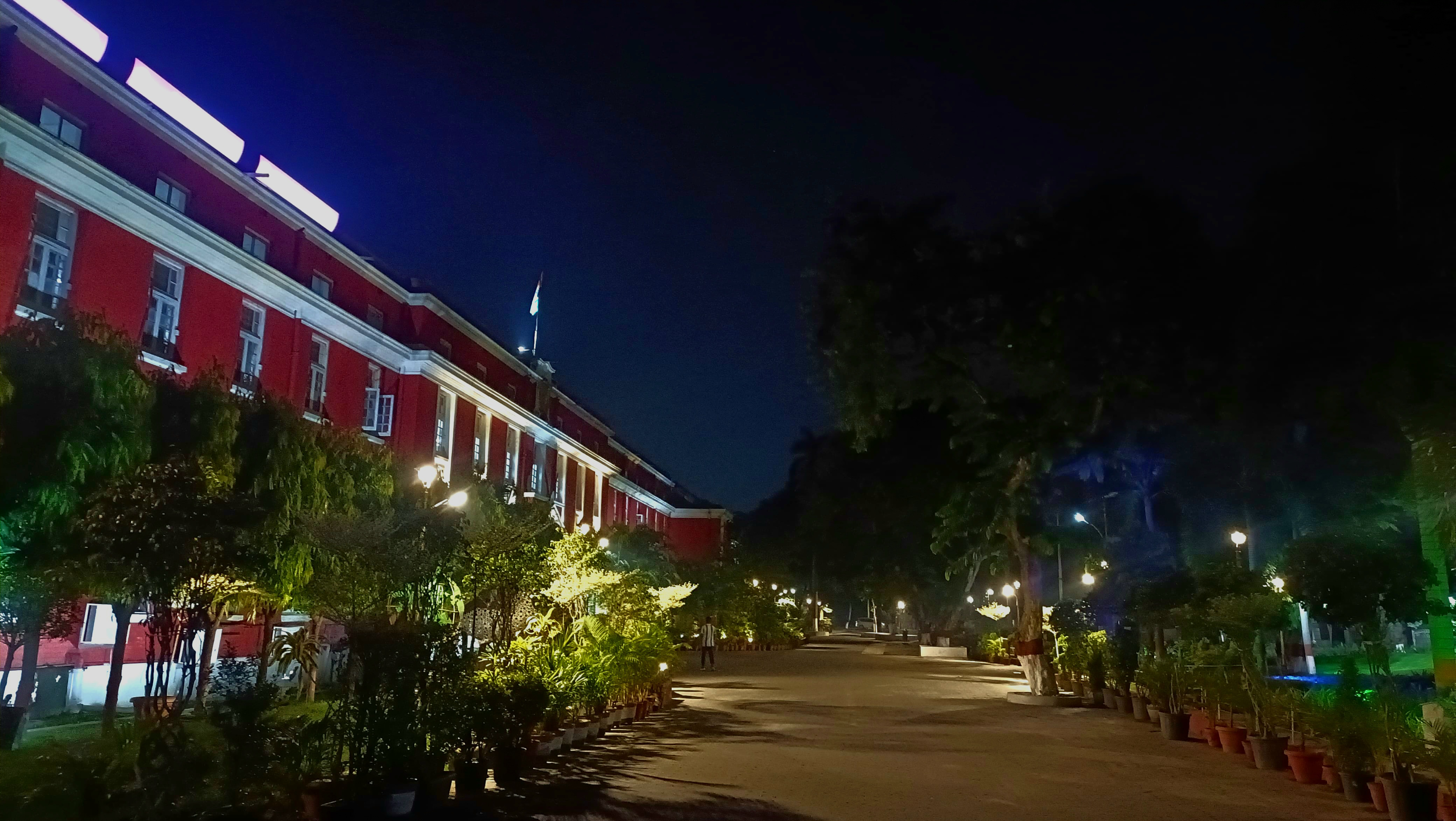
- The illuminated DRM Building of Asansol Division at night

Overview
- Owner: Eastern Railway zone
- Locale: Asansol, West Bengal, India

Service
- Type: Railway division
- System: Indian Railways

History
- Opened: 1925; 101 years ago

Asansol railway division is one of the four railway divisions under the jurisdiction of Eastern Railway zone of the Indian Railways. It was formed in 1925 and its headquarters is located in Asansol in West Bengal, India. The division operates a rail network across parts of West Bengal, Jharkhand and Bihar, covering districts of Paschim Bardhaman, Purba Bardhaman, Birbhum, Dhanbad, Deoghar Jamtara, Giridih and Jamui and includes sections of the Howrah–Delhi main line between Khana Junction and Jhajha, as well as of the Grand Chord up to Pradhankhunta, along with several branch lines. From an economic and tourism standpoint, It is also one of the major revenue generating divisions of the Eastern Railway as it covers coal bearing regions such as the Raniganj Coalfield and Jharia Coalfield, areas associated with the Damodar Valley Corporation and includes rail links to religious sites including Baidyanath Dham and Sammed Shikharji.

The Howrah, Sealdah, and Malda railway divisions are the other divisions under the Eastern Railway (ER) Zone, which is headquartered in Kolkata, West Bengal.

== List of railway stations and towns ==
The list includes the stations under the Asansol railway division and their station category.

Category of station	No. of stations	Names of stations
NSG-1	0	
NSG-2	2	Asansol Junction, Jasidih Junction
NSG-3	2	Durgapur, Madhupur Junction
NSG-4	1	Raniganj
NSG-5	20	Andal Junction, Baidyanathdham, Barakar, Basukinath, Chittaranjan, Deoghar, Dubrajpur, Dumka, Giridih, Jamtara, Kulti, Kumardubi, Mankar, Panagarh, Pandabeswar, Simultala, Sitarampur, Siuri, Ukhra, Vidyasagar
NSG-6	31	Barabani, Barachak, Bhimgara Junction, Chandan, Chhota Ambana, Chinpai, Galsi, Ghormara, Jagadishpur, Kajoragram, Kalipahari, Kalubathan, Karjhausa, Katoria, Kumrabad Rohini, Kunuri, Lahabon, Madankata, Maheshmunda, Mathurapur, Mugma, Panchra, Paraj, Rajbandh, Rupnarayanpur, Salanpur, Shankarpur, Sonachara, Tapasi, Thaparnagar, Waria
HG-2	10	Harlatanr, Jamuria, Joramow, Kachujor, Kaseetanr Halt, Krishna Ballabh Sahay, Narganjo Halt, Satsang Nagar Halt, Siduli, Telwa Bazar Halt
HG-3	29	Arjun Nagar Halt, Bhalua, Chandanpahari, Chinchuriya, Dhanpatdih, Ikra Junction, Ishan Chandi Halt, Jama, Kakbara, Kakni, Khariadih, Mahishadahari, Mohanpur, New Madanpur, New Nawadih, Rajla, Sirsa Nunthar Halt, Sugapahari Halt, Sugapahari etc.
Total	95	-
