= Jamui district =

District in Bihar, India

Coordinates: 24.9200°N 86.2200°E

- District of Bihar
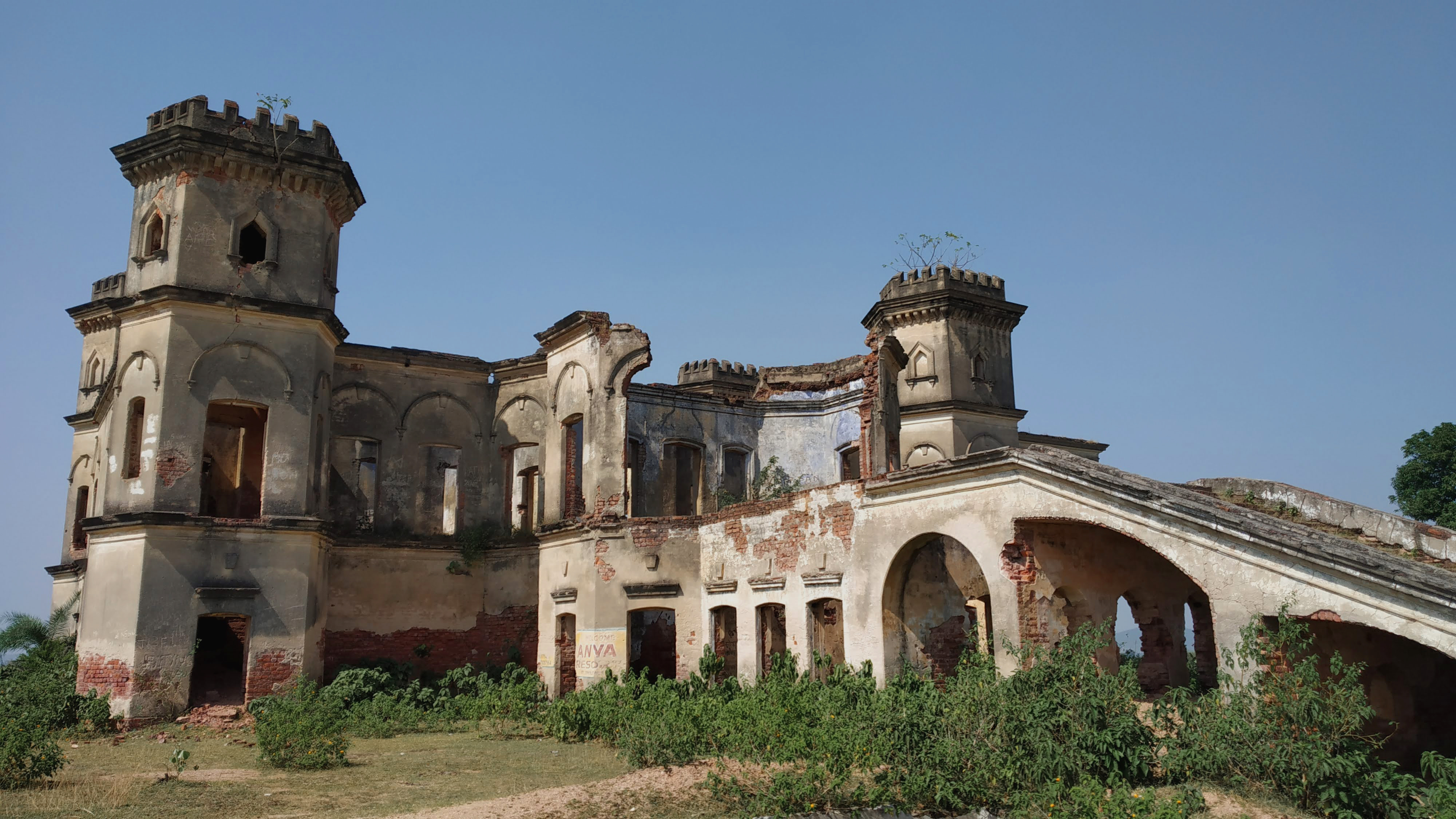
- Naldanga Palace, Lattu hill, Simultala
- Interactive map of Jamui district
- Country: India
- State: Bihar
- Division: Munger
- Headquarters: Jamui

Government
  - District Magistrate: Abhilasha Sharma, I.A.S
  - Lok Sabha constituencies: Jamui

Area
  - Total: 3,122 km^{2} (1,205 sq mi)

Population (2011)
  - Total: 1,760,405
  - Density: 563.9/km^{2} (1,460/sq mi)

Demographics
  - Literacy: 62.16 per cent
  - Sex ratio: 921
- Time zone: UTC+05:30 (IST)
- PIN Code: 811301
- Average annual precipitation: 1102 mm
- Website: jamui.nic.in

Jamui district is a district among 38 districts of Bihar state, India. The district was formed on 21 February 1991, when it was separated from Munger district. The district headquarters is Jamui. It is located at a longitude of 86° 13'E and the latitude is 24° 55'N.

== History ==
Various literature indicates that Jamui was once known as Jambhiyaagram. According to Jainism, the 24th Tirthankara lord Mahavira attained omniscience (Kevala Jnana) in Jambhiyagram situated on the bank of river named Ujjihuvaliya. Another place traced as "Jrimbhikgram" on the bank of Rijuvalika river, resembles Jambhiyagram, Ujjhuvaliya.

The Hindi translation of the words Jambhiya and Jrimbhikgram is Jamuhi which is developed in the recent time as Jamui.

With the passage of time, the river Ujhuvaliya /Rijuvalika is supposed to be developed as the river Ulai and as such both the place are still found in Jamui. The Ulai river is still flowing nearby Jamui. The old name of Jamui has been traced as Jambhubani in a copper plate which has been kept in Patna Museum. This plate clarifies that in the 12th century, Jambhubani was today's Jamui. Thus, the two ancient names as Jambhiyagram and Jambubani prove that this district was important as a religious place for Jains, and it was also a place of Gupta Empire.

In the 19th century; the historian Buchanan also visited this place in 1811 and found the historical facts. According to other historians Jamui, was also famous in the era of the Mahabharata.

According to available literature, Jamui was related to Gupta and Pala rulers before the 12th century. But after that this place became famous for Chandel rulers. Prior to Chandel Raj, this place was ruled by Nigoria, who was defeated by Chandels and the dynasty of Chandela founded in the 13th century. The kingdom of Chandels spread over the whole of Jamui.

According to Joseph David Freedone Melik Beglar there is the ruin of an old fort in indpe which belongs to Nigoria ruler.

Arun Bharti is the current Member of Parliament from Jamui.

The district is currently a part of the Red Corridor.

== Geography ==
Jamui district occupies an area of 3,098 square kilometres (1,196 sq mi), comparatively equivalent to Indonesia's Yamdena Island. The district has untapped reserves of resources including mica, coal, gold and iron ore.Situated along the Bihar-Jharkhand border, Jamui is dotted with hills and the small retreat town of Simultala falls within the Jhajha block, on the main Delhi-Howrah rail line. The town of Gidhaur, situated 17 kilometres (11 mi) away was the seat of kings during the British Raj and many buildings from the period still survive. Minto Tower in Gidhaur is a prime example of architecture from the period.

== Politics ==
District	No.	Constituency	Name	Party	Alliance	Remarks
Jamui	240	Sikandra (SC)	Prafull Kumar Manjhi	HAM(S)	NDA	
Jamui	241	Jamui	Shreyasi Singh	BJP	NDA	Minister
Jamui	242	Jhajha	Damodar Rawat	JD(U)	NDA	
Jamui	243	Chakai	Savitri Devi	RJD	MGB	

== Tourism ==
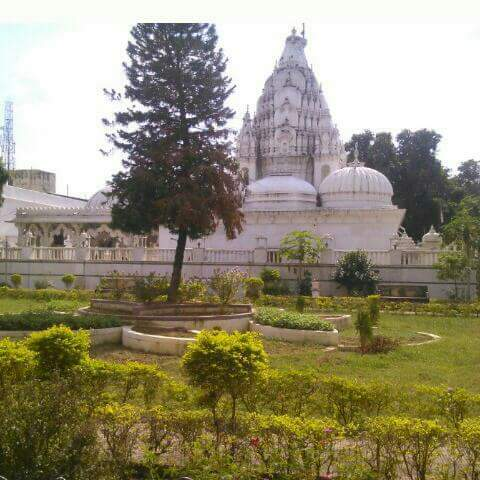
Lachhuar Jain Mandir

Jain Mandir Lachhuar is a large rest house (dharmsala) of 65 rooms constructed for the Jain pilgrims. There is a Mandir of Lord Mahavira inside the dhamsala. The idol in this temple is more than 2,600 years old. This black stone idol is of weighs around 250 kg. This is situated on the way of Kshatriya Kund Gram, the birthplace of Lord Mahavira. This place is located in Sikandra Block which is about 20 km west from Jamui District Headquarter.

Gidheshwar temple: Gidheshwar Temple is locally known as a Shiva Temple. The place is located 15 km south of Jamui. It is a beautiful temple of Lord Shiva situated on the top of boulders. As per the legends, when Lankapati Ravana was taking away Mother Sita by deceit, the king of birds, Jatayu, fought with Ravana to save Mother Sita. It is said that Ravana cut off Jatayu's wings. After being badly injured in this fight, Jatayu fell on a mountain. Later, at that place this temple was built. The place is full of devotees on Shivratri and Magh Purnima.

Minto Tower Gidhaur: Minto tower was built by the Maharaja of Gidhaur in 1909 to commemorate the visit of the then British Viceroy Lord Irwin to Gidhaur. It is in the middle of Gidhaur Market on the main Jamui-Jhajha state highway.

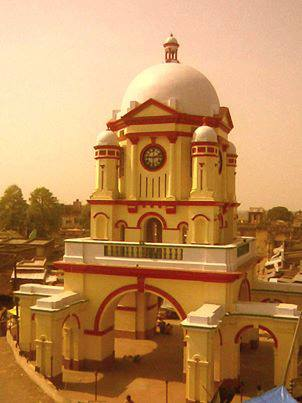
Minto Tower Gidhaur

== Economy ==
In 2006 the Ministry of Panchayati Raj named Jamui one of the country's 250 most backward districts (out of a total of 640). It is one of the 36 districts in Bihar currently receiving funds from the Backward Regions Grant Fund Programme (BRGF).

== Blocks ==
Subdivision	Block	No. Of Panchayat	No. of Villages
Jamui	Jamui	12	081
	Khaira	22	120
	Sikandra	14	068
	Islamnagar Aliganj	13	069
	Laxmipur	13	082
	Gidhaur	08	020
	Barhat	09	043
	Sono	19	250
	Chakai	23	600
	Jhajha	20	197
	Total	153	1530

== Demographics ==
Historical population
Year	Pop.	±% p.a.
1901	345,129	—
1911	355,934	+0.31%
1921	338,455	−0.50%
1931	381,115	+1.19%
1941	430,855	+1.23%
1951	476,167	+1.00%
1961	573,834	+1.88%
1971	713,736	+2.21%
1981	862,589	+1.91%
1991	1,051,527	+2.00%
2001	1,398,796	+2.89%
2011	1,760,405	+2.33%

Religions in Jamui district (2011)
Religion	Percent
Hinduism	86.67%
Islam	12.36%
Christianity	0.48%
Other or not stated	0.49%

According to the 2011 census Jamui district has a population of 1,760,405, roughly equal to the nation of The Gambia or the US state of Nebraska. This gives it a ranking of 273rd in India (out of a total of 640). The district has a population density of 567 inhabitants per square kilometre (1,470/sq mi) . Its population growth rate over the decade 2001–2011 was 25.54%. Jamui has a sex ratio of 921 females for every 1000 males, and a literacy rate of 62.16%. 8.26% of the population live in urban areas. Scheduled Castes and Scheduled Tribes make up 17.19% and 4.48% of the population respectively.

Languages of Jamui district (2011)
1. Hindi (73.4%)
2. 'Other' Hindi (7.02%)
3. Urdu (6.81%)
4. Khortha (5.94%)
5. Santali (3.66%)
6. Magahi (3.06%)
7. Others (0.14%)

At the time of the 2011 Census of India, 73.37% of Jamui spoke Hindi, 6.81% Urdu and 5.94% Khortha as their first language, 3.66% of the population speak Santali and 3.06% of the population speak Magahi and 0.14% speak other languages. 7.02% of the population spoke languages recorded as 'Others' under Hindi on the census.

== Transport ==
Jamui Railway Station, station code JMU, is one of the major railway stations in Danapur division of East Central Railway. Jamui is connected to metropolitan areas of India, by the Delhi-Kolkata Main Line via Mugalsarai-Patna route which runs along the historic Grand Trunk road.

Jamui Station serves the headquarters of Jamui district in the Indian state of Bihar. Railways and roads are the main means of transport in the region. The Jamui railway station is in Howrah-Patna-Mughalsarai main line. Most of the Patna, Barauni bound express trains coming from Howrah, Sealdah, Ranchi, Tatanagar stop here.

== Flora and fauna ==
In 1987 Jamui district became home to the Nagi Dam Wildlife Sanctuary, which has an area of 7.9 km^{2} (3.1 mi^{2}). It is also home to the Nakti Dam Wildlife Sanctuary, which was established in 1987 and has an area of 3.3 km^{2} (1.3 mi^{2}). There is also some forest in the region including famous Gangta Forest.
