= Asansol–Patna section =

Railway route of India

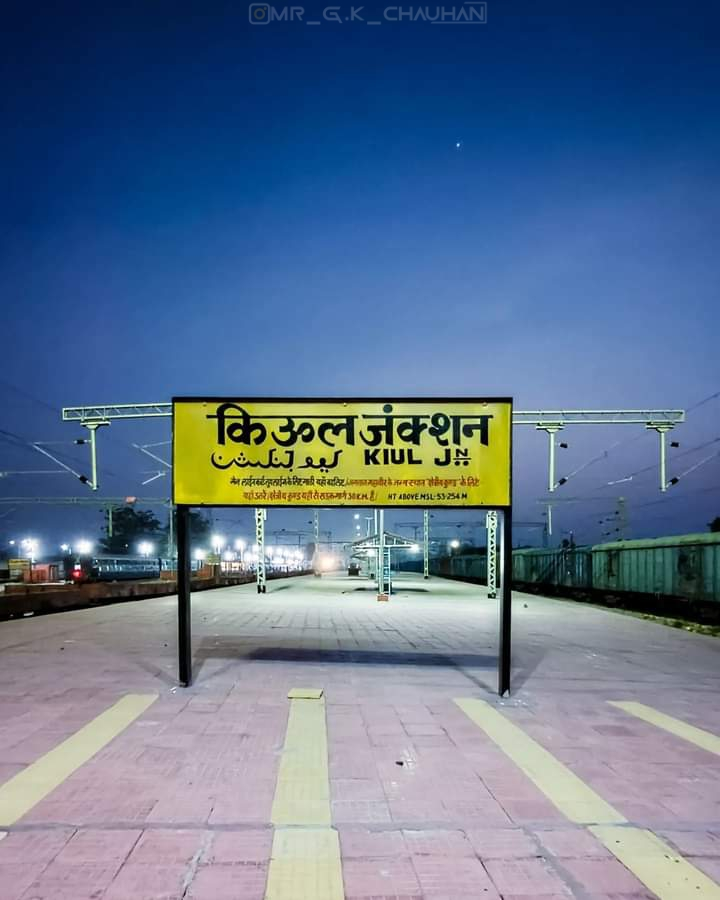
- Kiul Junction is an important railway station on Asansol–Patna section

Overview
- Status: Operational
- Owner: Indian Railways
- Locale: West Bengal, Jharkhand, Bihar
- Termini: Asansol; Patna

Service
- Operator(s): Eastern Railway, East Central Railway

History
- Opened: 1871

Technical
- Line length: 331 km (206 mi)
- Number of tracks: 2
- Track gauge: 5 ft 6 in (1,676 mm) broad gauge
- Electrification: 25 kV 50 Hz AC OHLE in 1960–61 and during 1994–95 and 2000–01
- Operating speed: up to 130 km/h

The Asansol–Patna section is a railway line connecting Asansol in the Indian state of West Bengal and Patna in Bihar. The 331 km (206 mi) line passes through the fringe areas of West Bengal, a portion of Santhal Parganas in Jharkhand and the Gangetic Plain in Bihar.

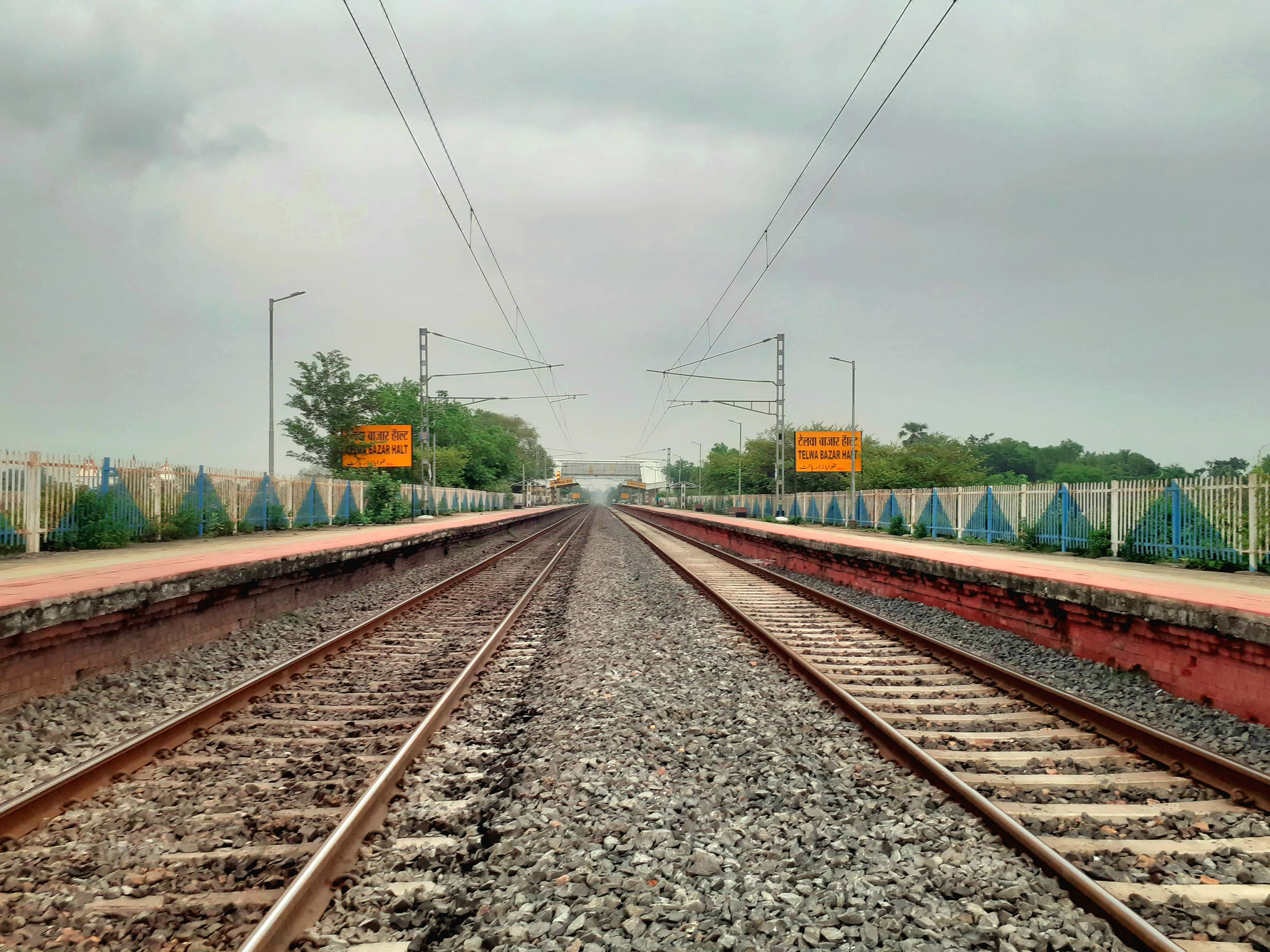
Electrified double-track Asansol–Patna section of the Howrah–New Delhi main line at Telwa Bazar Halt, Bihar.

== History ==
The first rail track between Howrah and Delhi was via what was later named as Sahibganj loop and the first through train on the route was run in 1864. The Kiul–Patna sector was ready around 1862. A "shorter main line" connecting Raniganj and Kiul Junction was in position in 1871 and the opening of the Grand Chord in 1907 shortened the distance from Howrah to Delhi even further.

== Electrification ==
The Asansol–Sitarampur sector was electrified in 1960–61 and the rest of the Asansol–Patna section was electrified during the period 1994–95 to 2000–2001. Sector-wise progress was as follows: Sitarampur–Chittaranjan 1994–95, Chittaranjan–Jamtara 1995–96, Jamtara–Jasidih 1996–97, Jasidih–Narganjo 1997–98, Narganjo–Jhajha 1998–99, Jhajha–Kiul in 1997–98, Kiul–Mankatha 1999–2000, Mankatha–Barhaiya 2000–01, Barhaiya–Mokama 1999–2000 Mokama–Fatuha 1998–99, Fatuha–Danapur 1999–2000.

== Speed limit ==
The entire Sitarampur–Patna–Mughalsarai line is classified as "B Class" line, where trains can run at speeds up to 130 km/h.

== Passenger movement ==
Patna and Asansol, on this line, are amongst the top hundred booking stations of Indian Railway.

== Sheds and workshops ==
Chittaranjan Locomotive Works, one of the largest electric locomotive manufacturers in the world, is located on this line. Initially started for manufacturing steam locomotives, it went into production on 26 January 1950, the day when India became a republic. It now produces AC and DC locomotives and accessories.

Asansol is home to the oldest electric loco shed of Indian Railways. It houses WAG-5 and WAM-4 electric locomotives.

== Railway reorganisation ==
In 1952, Eastern Railway, Northern Railway and North Eastern Railway were formed. Eastern Railway was formed with a portion of East Indian Railway Company, east of Mughalsarai and Bengal Nagpur Railway. Northern Railway was formed with a portion of East Indian Railway Company west of Mughalsarai, Jodhpur Railway, Bikaner Railway and Eastern Punjab Railway. North Eastern Railway was formed with Oudh and Tirhut Railway, Assam Railway and a portion of Bombay, Baroda and Central India Railway. East Central Railway was created in 1996–97.

== Trains ==
The Following trains are famously serving this route.

- South Bihar Express
- Kolkata Shalimar–Patna AC Duronto Express
- Baidyanathdham Express
- Himgiri Superfast Express
- Bilaspur-Patna Weekly SF Express
- Gurumukhi Superfast Express
- Poorva Express (via Patna)
- Akal Takht Express
- Howrah-New Delhi Duronto Express
- Pratham Swatrantata Sangram Express
- Tatanagar-Buxar Express
- Kumbh Express
- Upasana Express
- Ananya Express
- Howrah-Patna Jan Shatabdi Express
- Howrah-Patna Vande Bharat Express
- Asansol-Mumbai CSMT Superfast Express
- Ahmedabad-Asansol Weekly Express
- Howrah-Amritsar Mail
- Vibhuti Express
- Kolkata-Ghazipur City Weekly Express
- Kolkata-Patna Garib Rath Express
- Howrah–Rajendra Nagar Express

While There are also a lot of Passenger and Express trains that serves this section.

== See also ==
- Patna–Digha Ghat line
