= New Delhi–Howrah main line =

Railway line connecting Delhi and Kolkata

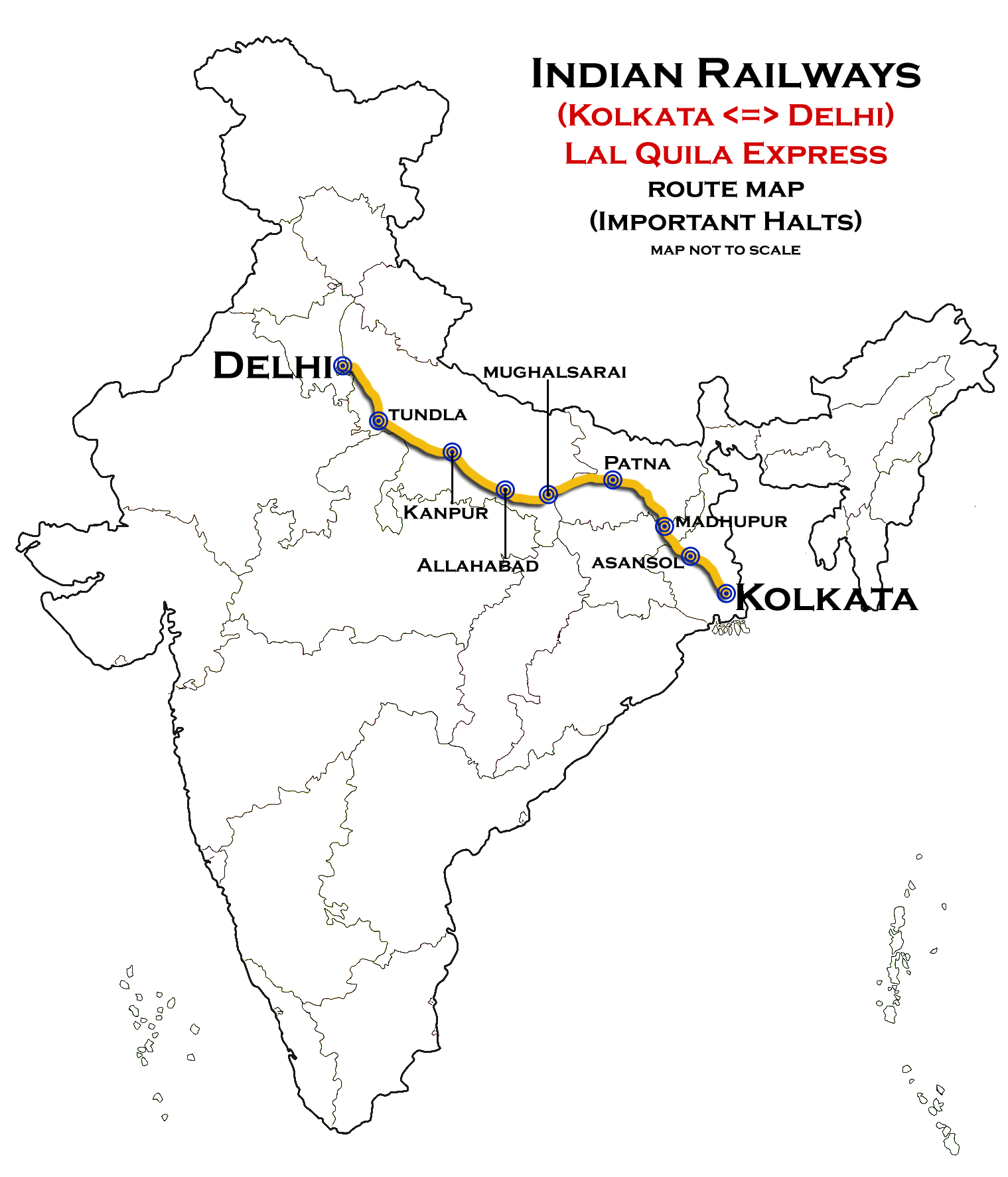
- Route map of Howrah–Delhi main line

Overview
- Status: Operational
- Owner: Indian Railways
- Locale: West Bengal, Jharkhand, Bihar, Uttar Pradesh, Delhi
- Termini: New Delhi; Howrah

Service
- System: Electrified
- Operator(s): Eastern Railway, East Central Railway, North Central Railway, Northern Railway

History
- Opened: 1866

Technical
- Line length: via Patna: 1,523 km (946 mi); via Gaya: 1,445 km (898 mi)
- Num of tracks: 2/4
- Track gauge: 5 ft 6 in (1,676 mm) broad gauge
- Electrification: 25 kV 50 Hz AC OHLE fully operational in 2002
- Operating speed: up to 130 km/h (80 mph)

The New Delhi–Howrah main line is a railway line connecting Delhi and Kolkata cutting across northern India. The 1,531 km (951 mi) railway line was opened to traffic in 1866 with the introduction of the "1 Down/2 Up Mail" train.

== Sections ==
The 1,531 km (951 mi) long Howrah-Delhi main line (trunk route) has been divided in 6 sections:

1. Howrah–Bardhaman chord
2. Bardhaman–Asansol section
3. Asansol–Patna section
4. Patna–Mughalsarai section
5. Mughalsarai–Kanpur section
6. Kanpur–Delhi section

== History ==
=== The first 1 Down/2 Up Mail train ===
Railway transportation was introduced in India within 30 years of its maiden run in England. The Governor General Lord Dalhousie foresaw a tremendous potential for the speedy means of transport in securing British control over a vast country, not only in moving goods and people but also in the movement of the armed forces.

The East Indian Railway Company which was formed on 1 June 1845, completed its survey for a railway line from Kolkata, then called Calcutta, to Delhi via Mirzapur in 1846. The company initially became defunct on refusal of government guarantee, which was given in 1849. Thereafter, an agreement was signed between East Indian Railway Company and the East India Company, for the construction and operation of an "experimental" line between Kolkata and Rajmahal, which would later be extended to Delhi via Mirzapur. Construction began in 1851.

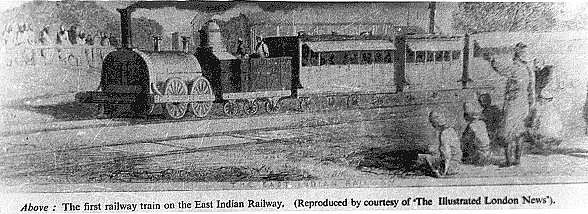
First train of the East Indian Railway, 1854

Howrah station was a tin shed and to reach it from Kolkata one had to cross the Hooghly in a ferry. On 15 August 1854, the first passenger train in the eastern section was operated up to Hooghly, 39 km (24 mi) away. On 1 February 1855 the first train ran from Hooghly to Raniganj, 195 km (121 mi) from Howrah.

The line was extended up to Rajmahal in October 1859, crossing Ajay River on the way. From Rajmahal, construction progressed rapidly, moving westward along the banks of the Ganges, reaching Bhagalpur in 1861, Munger in February 1862, and opposite Varanasi (across the Ganges) in December 1862 and then on to Naini on the bank of the Yamuna. The work included EIR's first tunnel at Jamalpur and first major bridge across the Son River at Arrah.

During 1863–64, work progressed rapidly on the Prayagraj–Kanpur–Tundla and Aligarh–Ghaziabad sections. The Yamuna bridge near Delhi was completed in 1864 and EIR established the Delhi terminus. On 1 August 1864, coaches were ferried across the Yamuna at Allahabad to allow the first through train to travel from Kolkata to Delhi. The Yamuna bridge at Allahabad opened on 15 August 1865 and in 1866 Kolkata and Delhi were directly linked. The 1 Down/2 Up Mail train, predecessor of the Kalka Mail, started running.

=== The "shorter main line" ===
With the completion of the 406 km-long (252 mi) line connecting Raniganj with Kiul in 1871, a "shorter main line" was in position. Initially, it was called the Chord Line. However, as it attracted more traffic it was designated the main line and the original line became the Sahibganj loop.

On 6 December 1906, the Grand Chord line from Sitarampur to Mughalsarai via Gaya, which shortened further the Kolkata–New Delhi distance, was inaugurated by the Earl of Minto, the Viceroy and Governor-General of India. It was thrown open to traffic in 1906. The total Howrah–New Delhi distance, via Grand Chord is 1,448 km (900 mi), as against 1,532 km (952 mi) of the Main line, and 1,686 km (1,048 mi) via Sahibganj loop.

=== New buildings ===
A pontoon bridge was built across the Hooghly River in 1874 to provide easy access to Howrah Station.

EIR constructed the Delhi Junction building in 1903. It then had 12 broad-gauge and 3 metre-gauge platforms. Howrah terminus was rebuilt as the largest railway station in India in 1905.

=== Reorganisation ===
On 1 January 1925 the British Indian Government took over the management of the East Indian Railway and divided it into six divisions: Howrah, Asansol, Danapur, Allahabad, Lucknow and Moradabad.

On 14 April 1952, Jawaharlal Nehru, the Prime Minister of India, inaugurated two new zones of the first six zones of the Indian Railways. One of them, the Northern Railways had the three "up-stream" divisions of East Indian Railway: Allahabad, Lucknow and Moradabad, while the other, the Eastern Railways had the three "down-stream" divisions: Howrah, Asansol and Danapur and the complete Bengal Nagpur Railway. Eastern Railway also had the Sealdah division, which it had acquired from the truncated Assam Bengal Railway at the time of partition.

South Eastern Railway was carved out of Eastern Railway on 1 August 1955. East Central Railway was created on 1 October 2002 with separation of three divisions – Dhanbad, Mughalsarai and Danapur – of Eastern Railway.

== Electrification ==
Except for the Sitarampur–Gaya–Mughalsarai sector called Grand Chord and the Howrah–Bardhaman sector, the Howrah–Gaya–Delhi line shares the rest of the track with Howrah–Delhi main line. The Howrah–Gaya–Delhi route was the first trunk route in India to be completely electrified (AC traction). As a result, most of the Howrah–Delhi main line was electrified earlier than the Sitarampur–Patna–Mughalsarai sector.

Around 1957–58 the Howrah–Bardhaman main line was electrified with 3 kV DC traction for Suburban services, which was later converted to 25 kV AC traction, around 1968–69. The Bardhaman–Waria sector was electrified in 1964–1966, Waria–Sitarampur sector in 1960–61, the Asansol–Patna sector during the period 1994–95 to 2000–2001, the Patna–Mughalsarai sector in 1999–2002, Mughalsarai–Kanpur sector during the period 1964–65 to 1968–69, and Kanpur–Delhi sector between 1968–69 and 1976–77.

== Speed limits ==
The Howrah–Delhi main line is planned to be upgraded as Group 'A' line where trains can operate up to 160 km/h (99 mph). The Howrah–Bandel–Bardhaman sector and the Sitarampur–Patna–Mughalsarai sector is classified as 'B' class line where trains can run up to 130 km/h (81 mph).

The New Delhi-Howrah Rajdhani Express (via Patna) is the fastest train of this route (and is one of the fastest Rajdhani train of India) to cover a distance of 1531 Km in just 19 hours and 25 minutes, while New Delhi-Rajendranagar Terminal (Patna) Tejas Rajdhani Express is one of the fastest train on this route as it covers this journey in 11 hours 30 minutes. Some of the other fast trains such as Poorva Express take around twenty-three hours. Some of the slower trains such as Toofan Express and Lal Quila, with more frequent stoppages, take around thirty hours.

=== Some important trains on the route ===
- Howrah–New Delhi Rajdhani Express (via Patna)
- Poorva Express
- Rajendra Nagar-New Delhi Tejas Rajdhani Express [Patna Rajdhani]
- Sampoorna Kranti Express
- Howrah–New Delhi Duronto Express
- Howrah-Amritsar Express
