= Tirupati–Srikakulam Road Humsafar Express =

Train in India

Overview
- Service type: Humsafar Express
- Status: Active
- Locale: Andhra Pradesh
- First service: 13 April 2026; 50 days ago (Inaugural); 19 April 2026; 44 days ago (Commercial)
- Current operator: South Coast Railways (SCoR)

Route
- Termini: Tirupati (TPTY); Srikakulam Road (CHE)
- Stops: 20
- Distance travelled: 852 km (529 mi)
- Average journey time: 19h 35m
- Service frequency: Weekly
- Train number: 17439 / 17440

On-board services
- Classes: Sleeper class (S1); AC 3 Tier (B1)
- Seating arrangements: No
- Sleeping arrangements: Yes
- Auto-rack arrangements: Upper
- Catering facilities: Pantry car On-board catering E-catering
- Observation facilities: Large windows
- Entertainment facilities: No
- Baggage facilities: No
- Other facilities: Below the seats

Technical
- Rolling stock: LHB-Humsafar
- Track gauge: Indian gauge
- Electrification: 25 kV 50 Hz AC Overhead line
- Operating speed: 44 km (27 mi) average including halts.
- Track owner: Indian Railways
- Rake sharing: Tirupati–Jammu Tawi Humsafar Express
Route map
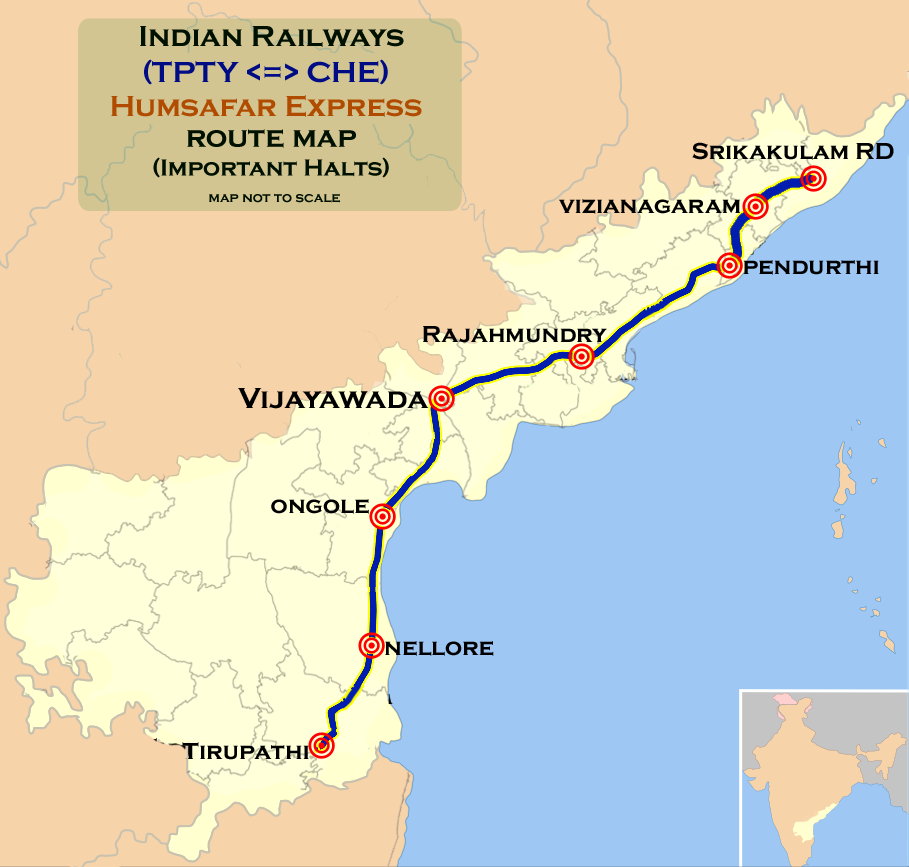

The 17439 / 17440 Tirupati–Srikakulam Road Humsafar Express is a Superfast Express train, which belongs to South Central Railway zone that runs between Tirupati and Srikakulam Road of Andhra Pradesh in India.

The express train is inaugurated on 13 April 2026 by Honorable Prime Minister Narendra Modi through video conference.

== Overview ==
The train is operated by Indian Railways, connecting Tirupati and Srikakulam Road. It is currently operated 17439/17440 on weekly basis.

== Schedule ==
Train Schedule: Tirupati ↔ Srikakulam Humsafar Express
Train No.	Station Code	Departure Station	Departure Time	Departure Day	Arrival Station	Arrival Hours
17439	TPTY	Tirupati	4:55 PM	Srikakulam Road	12:30 PM	19h 35m
17440	CHE	Srikakulam Road	03:00 PM	Tirupati	08:10 AM	17h 10m

== Routes and halts ==
The important halts of the train are:

- Tirupati
- Renigunta Junction
- Gudur Junction
- Nellore
- Ongole
- Chirala
- Bapatla
- Tenali Junction
- Vijayawada Junction
- Eluru
- Rajahmundry
- Samalkot Junction
- Elamanchili
- Anakapalle
- Duvvada
- Pendurthi
- Kottavalasa Junction
- Vizianagaram Junction
- Cheepurupalli
- Srikakulam Road

== Traction ==
As the entire route is fully electrified, it is hauled by a Lallaguda Loco Shed or Visakhapatnam Loco Shed-based WAP-7 electric locomotive from Tirupati to Srikakulam Road and vice versa.

== Coach composition ==
The train is completely 3-tier AC sleeper designed by Indian Railways with features of LED screen display to show information about stations, train speed etc. and will have announcement system as well, vending machines for tea, coffee and milk, bio toilets in compartments as well as CCTV cameras.

== Rake share ==
The train will rake sharing with Tirupati–Jammu Tawi Humsafar Express (22705/22706).

== See also ==
Trains from Tirupati :

- Tirupati–Sainagar Shirdi Express
- Sapthagiri Express
- Tirupati–Secunderabad Superfast Express
- Tirupati–Puducherry Weekly Express
- Howrah–Tirupati Humsafar Express

No trains from Srikakulam Road

== Notes ==
a. Runs a day in a week with both directions.
