= Nawalsahi =

- Village
- Location in Jharkhand, India Nawalsahi (India)
- Coordinates: 24.431056°N 85.772722°E
- Country: India
- State: Jharkhand
- District: Koderma

Population (2011)
  - Total: 1,167

Languages (*For language details see Domchanch (community development block)#Language and religion)
  - Official: Hindi, Urdu
- Time zone: UTC+5:30 (IST)
- PIN: 825418
- Telephone/ STD code: 06543
- Vehicle registration: JH 12
- Lok Sabha constituency: Kodarma
- Vidhan Sabha constituency: Kodarma
- Website: koderma.nic.in

Nawalsahi is a village in the Domchanch CD block in the Koderma subdivision of the Koderma district in the Indian state of Jharkhand.

== Geography ==
Cities, towns and locations in Koderma district in North Chotanagpur Division
M: municipality, CT: census town, R: rural/ urban centre, D: dam, P: power plant, T: tourist centre
Owing to space constraints in the small map, the actual locations in a larger map may vary slightly

=== Location ===
Nawalsahi is located at 24.431056°N 85.772722°E

=== Overview ===
Koderma district is plateau territory and around 60% of the total area is covered with forests. The first dam of the Damodar Valley Corporation, at Tilaiya, was built across the Barakar River and inaugurated in 1953. Koderma Junction railway station has emerged as an important railway centre in the region. It is a predominantly rural district with only 19.72% urban population.

Note: The map alongside presents some of the notable locations in the district. All places marked in the map are linked in the larger full screen map.

== Demographics ==
According to the 2011 Census of India, Nawalsahi had a total population of 1,167, of which 597 (51%) were males and 570 (49%) were females. Population in the age range 0–6 years was 222. The total number of literate persons in Nawalsahi was 578 (61.16% of the population over 6 years).

== Civic administration ==
=== Police station ===
Nawalsahi police station serves Domchanch CD block.

== Transport ==
There is a halt station at Nawalsahi on the Madhupur-Giridih-Koderma line.
