= Prayagraj–Anand Vihar Terminal Humsafar Express =

Train route in India

Prayagraj Junction - Anand Vihar Terminal Humsafar Express
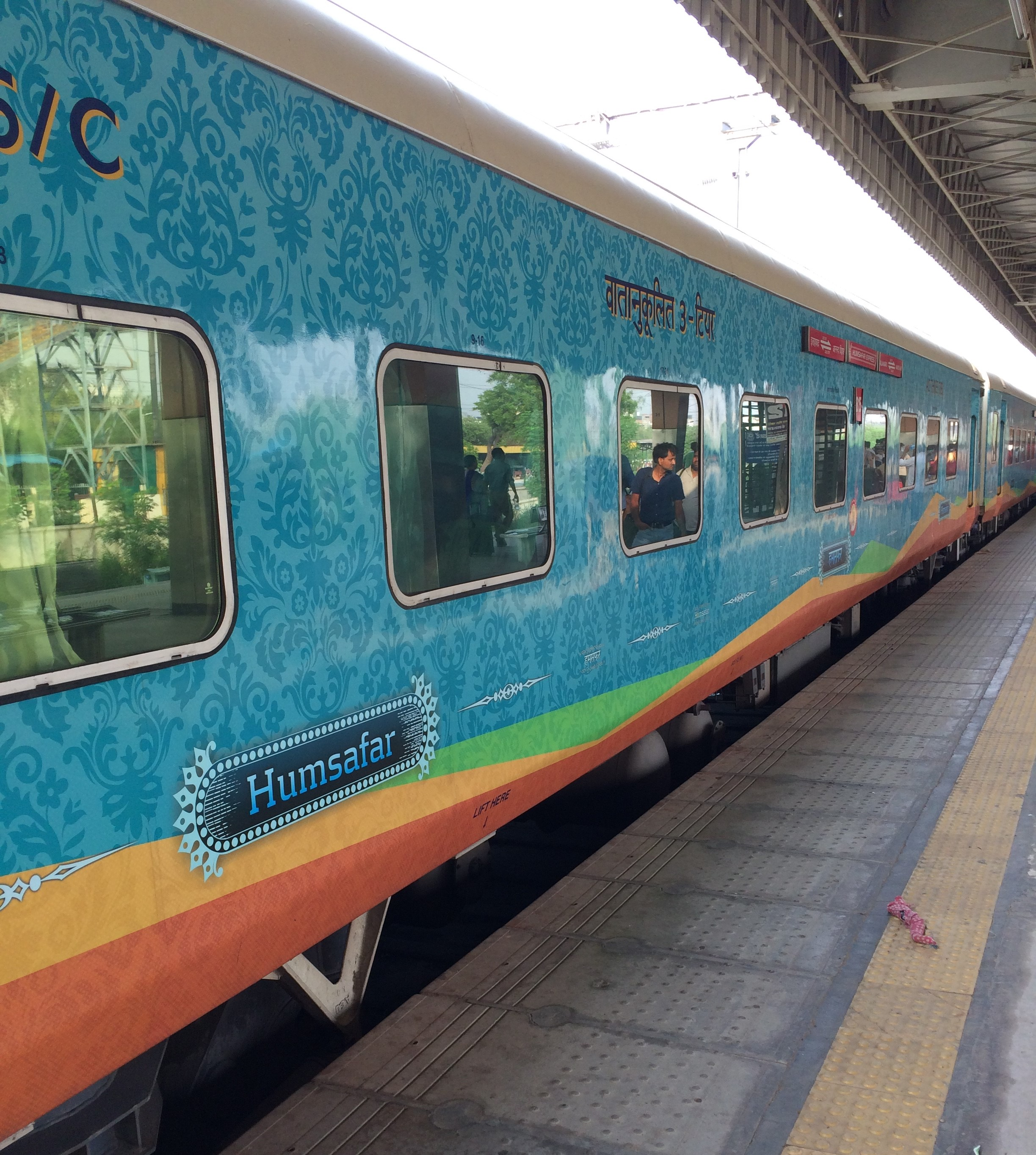
- Prayagraj-Anand Vihar Humsafar standing at Anand Vihar Terminal

Overview
- Service type: Humsafar Express
- First service: 9 May 2018; 8 years ago
- Current operator: North Central Railways

Route
- Termini: Prayagraj Junction (PRYJ); Anand Vihar Terminal (ANVT)
- Stops: 1
- Distance travelled: 622 km (386 mi)
- Average journey time: 7h 55m
- Service frequency: Tri-weekly
- Train number: 22437 / 22438

On-board services
- Classes: AC 3 tier, Sleeper
- Seating arrangements: No
- Sleeping arrangements: Yes
- Catering facilities: Available
- Observation facilities: Large windows
- Baggage facilities: Yes

Technical
- Rolling stock: LHB Humsafar
- Track gauge: 1,676 mm (5 ft 6 in)
- Operating speed: 79 km/h (49 mph) Avg. Speed

The 22437 / 22438 Prayagraj - Anand Vihar Terminal Humsafar Express is a superfast express train of the Indian Railways connecting Prayagraj Junction in Uttar Pradesh and Anand Vihar Terminal in Delhi. It is currently being operated with 22437/22438 train numbers on a tri-weekly basis.

== Service ==
It averages 79 km/h as 22437 Humsafar Express starts from Prayagraj Junction covering 622 km in 7 hrs 55 mins & 79 km/h as 22438 Humsafar Express starts from Anand Vihar Terminal covering 622 km in 7 hrs 50 min. It has a maximum speed of 130 km/h and it covers almost the entire journey at this speed.

== Traction ==
Both trains are hauled by a WAP 7 of Ghaziabad Electric Locomotive Shed on its entire journey.

== Coach composition ==
The train comprises 14 3-tier AC, 4 Sleeper LHB coach along with two generator cars at each end. It has two screens in each coach displaying information about upcoming stations and passenger awareness. It is also equipped with CCTV cameras in each coach to ensure passenger safety.
Coach composition for 22437 :

Loco	1	2	3	4	5	6	7	8	9	10	11	12	13	14	15	16	17	18	19	20
	EOG	S1	S2	S3	S4	B1	B2	B3	B4	B5	B6	B7	B8	B9	B10	B11	B12	B13	B14	EOG

Coach composition for 22438 :

Loco	1	2	3	4	5	6	7	8	9	10	11	12	13	14	15	16	17	18	19	20
	EOG	B14	B13	B12	B11	B10	B9	B8	B7	B6	B5	B4	B3	B2	B1	S4	S3	S2	S1	EOG

It is having a rake sharing arrangement with 12275/76 Prayagraj New Delhi Humsafar Express.

== Route and halts ==
- Prayagraj Junction
- Kanpur Central
- Anand Vihar Terminal

== See also ==
- Humsafar Express
