= Gorakhpur–Anand Vihar Terminal Humsafar Express (via Barhni) =

Indian rail service

Gorakhpur - Anand Vihar Terminal Humsafar Express (via Barhni)

Overview
- Service type: Express
- First service: 16 December 2016; 9 years ago
- Current operator: Northern Eastern Railways

Route
- Termini: Gorakhpur Junction (GKP); Anand Vihar Terminal (AVNT)
- Stops: 6
- Distance travelled: 839 km (521 mi)
- Average journey time: 13 hours 50 mins
- Service frequency: Wed, Fri, Sat, Sun
- Train number: 12571 / 12572

On-board services
- Class: AC 3 tier
- Seating arrangements: No
- Sleeping arrangements: Yes
- Catering facilities: Available
- Observation facilities: Large windows
- Baggage facilities: Yes

Technical
- Rolling stock: LHB Humsafar
- Track gauge: 1,676 mm (5 ft 6 in)
- Operating speed: 60 km/h (37 mph)

The 12571/12572 Gorakhpur - Anand Vihar Terminal Humsafar Express is a superfast express train of the Indian Railways connecting Gorakhpur in Uttar Pradesh and Anand Vihar Terminal in Delhi. It is currently being operated with 12571/12572 train numbers on a twice weekly basis. It shares its rake with Gorakhpur - Anand Vihar Terminal Humsafar Express (Via Basti). This is the first Humsafar train.

== Coach composition ==
The train is completely composed of three-tier AC sleeper cars designed by Indian Railways with features of LED screen display to show information about stations, train speed etc. It has an announcement system; vending machines for tea, coffee and milk; bio toilets in compartments; and CCTV cameras.

== Service ==
It averages 61 km/h as 12571 Humsafar Express starts on Sunday and covering 839 km in 13 hrs 50 mins & 63 km/h as 12572 Humsafar Express starts on Monday covering 839 km in 13 hrs 15 mins.

== Schedule ==
Train number	Station code	Departure station	Departure time	Departure day	Arrival station	Arrival time	Arrival day
12571	GKP	Gorakhpur	6:45 PM	SUN WED FRI SAT	Anand Vihar Terminal	8:50 AM	MON THR SAT SUN
12572	ANVT	Anand Vihar Terminal	8:00 PM	SUN MON THU SAT	Gorakhpur	9:35 AM	MON TUE FRI SUN

== Traction ==
This train is hauled by WDP-4D of Gonda diesel loco shed from GKP to GD and from GD to ANVT it is hauled by Ghaziabad based WAP 7 electric locomotive and vice versa.

== Stoppage ==
- Gorakhpur Junction
- Anandnagar Junction
- Siddharthnagar
- Barhni
- Balrampur
- Gonda Junction
- Lucknow Charbagh
- Kanpur Central
- Anand Vihar Terminal

== See also ==
- Humsafar Express
- Gorakhpur railway station
- Anand Vihar Terminal railway station
- Gorakhpur–Anand Vihar Terminal Humsafar Express (via Basti)
