= Baba Baidyanath Dham Deoghar Humsafar Express =

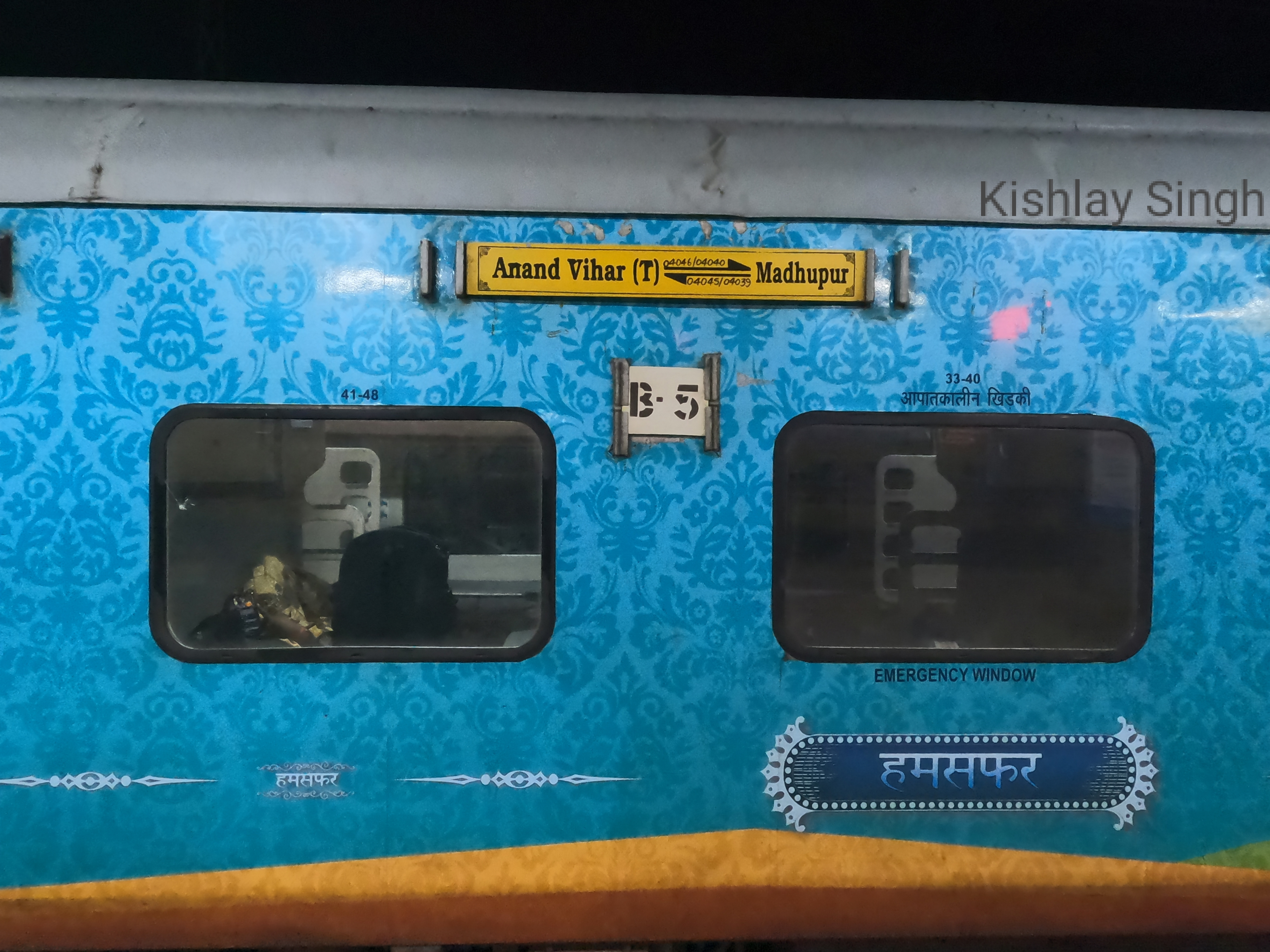

Overview
- Service type: Humsafar Express
- First service: 14 January 2020; 5 years ago
- Current operator: Northern Railways

Route
- Termini: Madhupur Junction (MDP); Anand Vihar Terminal (ANVT)
- Stops: 10
- Distance travelled: 1,233 km (766 mi)
- Average journey time: 18 hours (Approx.)
- Service frequency: Weekly
- Train number: 22459 / 22460

On-board services
- Class: AC 3 tier
- Seating arrangements: No
- Sleeping arrangements: Yes
- Catering facilities: Available
- Baggage facilities: Yes

Technical
- Rolling stock: LHB Humsafar
- Track gauge: 1,676 mm (5 ft 6 in)
- Operating speed: 74 km/h (46 mph) Avg. Speed

The 22459 / 22460 Baba Baidyanath Dham Humsafar Express (also known as Madhupur - Anand Vihar Terminal Humsafar Express) is a Superfast express train of the Humsafar Express category belonging to Indian Railways - Northern railway zone that runs between Madhupur Junction and Anand Vihar Terminal in India.

It is operated as train number 22460 from Anand Vihar Terminal to Madhupur Junction and as train number 22459 in the reverse direction serving the states of Jharkhand, Bihar, Uttar Pradesh & Delhi.

== Coaches ==
The train comprises 16 3-tier AC, 1 extra 3-tier AC Economy, 2 Sleeper LHB coach along with two generator cars at each end. It has two screens in each coach displaying information about upcoming stations and passenger awareness. It is also equipped with CCTV cameras in each coach to ensure passenger safety. It has rake sharing arrangement with train number 12235/36 Madhupur - Anand Vihar Terminal Humsafar Express

Loco	1	2	3	4	5	6	7	8	9	10	11	12	13	14	15	16	17	18	19	20	21
	EOG	ME1	B1	B2	B3	B4	B5	B6	B7	B8	B9	B10	B11	B12	B13	B14	B15	B16	S1	S2	EOG

== Service ==
The service covers a distance of 1,233 km (766 mi) in approximately 17 hours between Anand Vihar Terminal and Madhupur Junction at an average of about 74 km/h (46 mph).

== Traction ==
Both trains are hauled by a Ghaziabad (GZB) based WAP 7/WAP 5 locomotive on its entire journey.

== Route and halts ==
It runs from Madhupur via Jasidih Junction, Kiul Junction, Patna Junction, Ara Junction, Pandit Deen Dayal Upadhyaya Junction, Allahabad Junction, Kanpur Central to Anand Vihar Terminal.
