= Patna–SMVT Bengaluru Humsafar Express =

Patna Junction – SMVT Bengaluru Humsafar Express

Overview
- Service type: Humsafar Express
- First service: 2 March 2019; 7 years ago
- Current operator: East Central Railways

Route
- Termini: Patna Junction (PNBE); Sir M. Visvesaraya Terminal, Bengaluru (SMVB)
- Stops: 22
- Distance travelled: 2,694 km (1,674 mi)
- Average journey time: 48h 15m
- Service frequency: Weekly (Note: Runs one days in a week for every direction.)
- Train number: 22353 / 22354

On-board services
- Class: AC 3 tier
- Seating arrangements: Yes
- Sleeping arrangements: Yes
- Catering facilities: Available
- Observation facilities: Large windows

Technical
- Rolling stock: LHB Humsafar
- Track gauge: 1,676 mm (5 ft 6 in)
- Operating speed: 60 km/h (37 mph) average speed with halt

The 22353 / 22354 Patna–SMVT Bengaluru Humsafar Express is a superfast train belonging to East Central Railway zone that runs between Patna Junction and SMVT Bengaluru of Bengaluru city.

It is currently being operated with 22353/22354 train numbers on a weekly basis.

== Coach composition ==
The trains is completely 3-tier AC sleeper trains designed by Indian Railways with features of LED screen display to show information about stations, train speed etc. and will have announcement system as well, Vending machines for tea, coffee and milk, Bio toilets in compartments as well as CCTV cameras.

== Service ==
The 22353/Patna - Sir M. Visvesaraya Terminal, Bengaluru Humsafar Express has an average speed of 61 km/h and covers 2640 km in 44h 15m.

The 22354/Sir M. Visvesaraya Terminal, Bengaluru - Patna Humsafar Express has an average speed of 60 km/h and covers 2640 km in 44h 35m.

== Route and halts ==
1. Patna Junction
2. Ara Junction
3. Buxar
4. Pt. DD Upadhyaya Junction (Mughalsarai)
5. Prayagraj Chheoki Junction
6. Satna
7. Katni Junction
8. Jabalpur Junction
9. Pipariya
10. Itarsi Junction
11. Betul
12. Nagpur Junction
13. Chandrapur
14. Balharshah
15. Warangal
16. Vijayawada Junction
17. Gudur Junction
18. Perambur
19. Katpadi Junction
20. Jolarpettai Junction
21. Krishnarajapuram
22. Sir M. Visvesaraya Terminal

== Traction ==
This route is fully electrified and both trains are hauled by a Gomoh Loco Shed based WAP-7 locomotive on its entire journey.

== Schedule ==
Train Number	Station Code	Departure Station	Departure Time	Departure Day	Arrival Station	Arrival Time	Arrival Day
22353	PNBE	Patna Junction	20:20 PM	Thursday	Sir M. Visvesaraya Terminal, Bengaluru	16:35 PM	Sat
22354	SMVB	Sir M. Visvesaraya Terminal, Bengaluru	13:50 PM	Sunday	Patna Junction	10:25 AM	Tue

== See also ==
- Humsafar Express
- Patna Junction railway station
- Banaswadi railway station
