= Giridih railway station =

Railway station in Giridih, India

Giridih
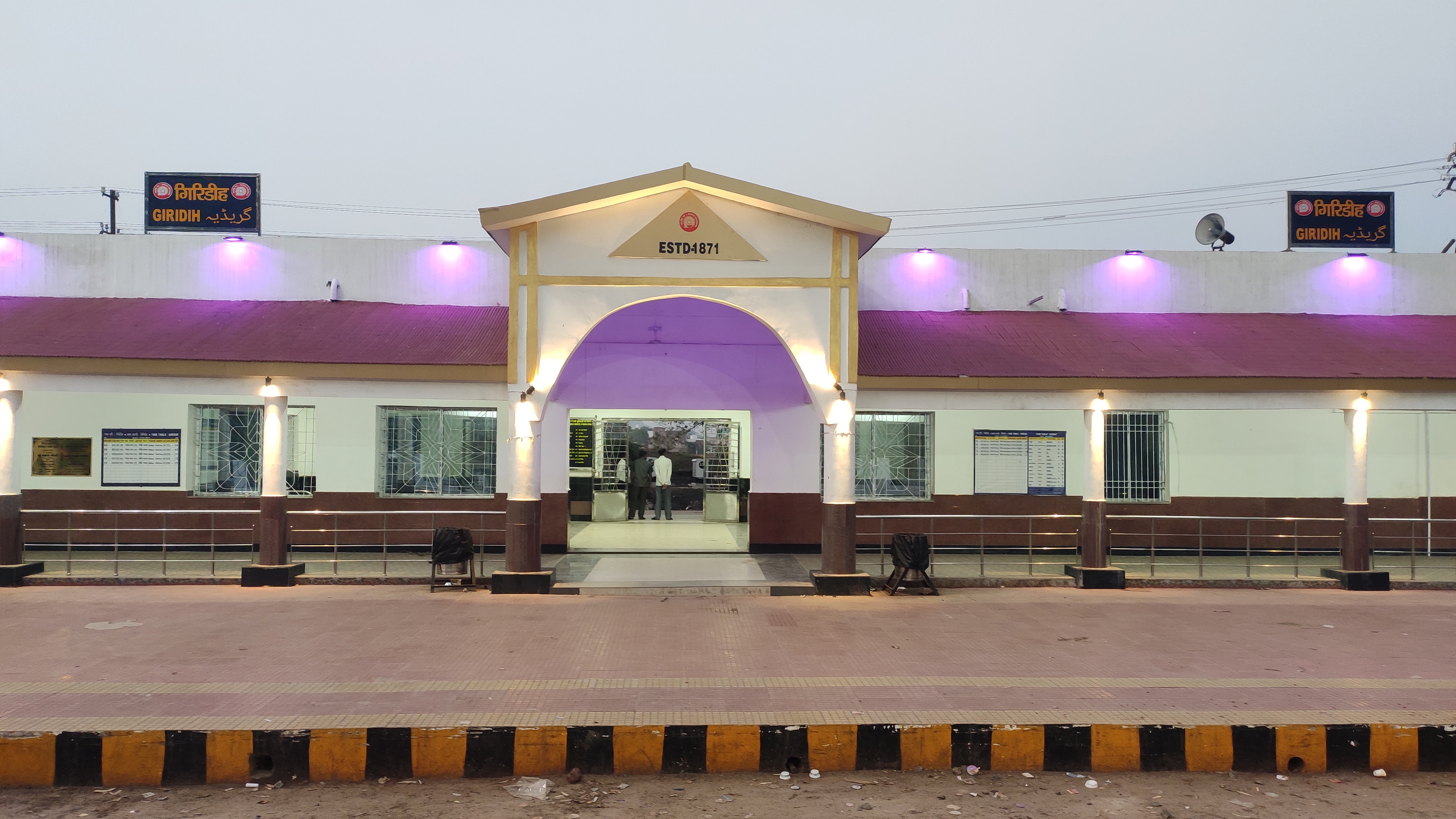
- Giridih railway station building

General information
- Location: Station Road, Giridih, Giridih district, Jharkhand; India
- Coordinates: 24°10′56″N 86°18′49″E
- Elevation: 289 metres (948 ft)
- System: Indian Railways station
- Line: Madhupur–Giridih
- Platforms: 1
- Tracks: 3

Construction
- Parking: Available

Other information
- Status: Functional
- Station code: GRD
- Zone(s): Eastern Railway zone
- Division(s): Asansol

History
- Opened: 1871; 155 years ago
- Rebuilt: 2020
- Electrified: 2020

Passengers
- 6000+ daily
Location

Giridih railway station, station code GRD, is the main railway station serving the city of Giridih, the headquarters of Giridih district in the Indian state of Jharkhand. Giridih station also serves as a gateway for the Jain pilgrims visiting Parasnath. Giridih is located at 24.18°N 86.3°E. It has an elevation of 289 metres (948 ft).

Giridih station is a terminal station located on the western end of Madhupur–Giridih line of the Asansol railway division in the Eastern Railway zone of Indian Railways. The Madhupur–Giridih route is a single-line broad-gauge between the two main railway stations Giridih and Madhupur Junction. The total length of the route is 38 kilometres (24 mi). It has a single platform and handles a total of 10 trains daily.

== History ==
Giridih railway station was built as a railway siding in 1871 by the British government in India (prior to the India's independence in 1947) mainly for transport of mineral reserve from the region. The contract for the railway siding was awarded in 1865 and the construction was completed in 1871. In 1901 the railway siding was converted into a railway station. The siding is owned by Central Coalfields.

A 110 km (68 mi) track from Koderma to Maheshmunda was constructed. This extended the Madhupur–Giridih railway line to Koderma, effectively making it a Madhupur–Giridih–Koderma line. A new station was built on Maheshmunda–Koderma section named as New Giridih (NGRH) which leaves out the already existing station Giridih (GRD) on this route, also making Maheshmunda a junction station. On 16 February 2019, Eastern Railway in its press-release announced a passenger train service w.e.f. 25 February 2019 from Koderma to Madhupur via New Giridih.

== Further extension ==
There are plans from the Railway ministry to connect Parasnath with New Giridih via Madhuban, for the convenience of the Jain pilgrims visiting Shikharji. construction of which was sanctioned and the project included in the Union Budget 2018–19 at a cost of ₹902.86 Crores on a 50:50 cost sharing basis between the Government of Jharkhand and Indian Railways. The foundation stone for construction was laid in 2019. The 49-km long railway line will have two crossing stations and a couple of halts. During the financial year 2022–23, Indian Railways had allotted ₹50 Crores for the above project for early starting of the project. In a land acquisition application submitted to DLAO/Giridih by DyCE/Con/HZME office, ₹78.27 Crores were demanded for Raiyati land of 26 villages and payment for land acquisition is yet awaited for deposition of fund from Government of Jharkhand.

There are other proposals as well to connect New Giridih with Dhanbad Junction via Tundi and Govindpur, and with Jhajha via Bengabad, Chakai and Sono. The first phase of the Jhajha–New Giridih rail line involves 20 km-long Jhajha–Batia section, the foundation for which was laid in 2019 and which will be constructed at a cost of Rs 496 crore.

== Facilities ==
The major facilities available are waiting rooms, toilets, computerized reservation facility, reservation counter, and two wheeler and four wheeler vehicle parking. The vehicles are allowed to enter the station premises.

=== Platforms ===
Currently there is a single platform apart from the railway siding that was built earlier.

=== Station layout ===
G	Street level	Exit/Entrance & ticket counter
P1	Side platform, No-1 doors will open on the left
P1	Track 1	Madhupur ← toward
P1	Track 2	Madhupur ← toward

== Services ==
Giridih terminal station handles Madhupur-bound passenger trains five times daily except Thursday and four times on Thursday. The passenger trains are run by Eastern Railway zone. Following are the trains arriving and departing from Giridih railway station.

The following Train services are available from this station:

Train No.	Train Name	Origin & Destination	Time of Departure (IST)	Time of Arrival (IST)	Running Days
53512/13, 53514/15, 53516/17, 53518/19, 53520/21,	Giridih-Madhupur Passenger	Giridih-Madhupur	4.40 AM, 9.10 AM, 1.35 PM, 6.40 PM, 10.10 PM	4.10 AM, 8.45 AM, 1.13 PM, 5.18 PM, 9.50 PM	Daily

A new express train connecting New Giridih to Ranchi was announced by Koderma MP Annpurna Devi on 6 April 2023 and Indian Railways released an official notification for the same on 23 August 2023. The inaugural run of New Giridih–Ranchi Intercity Express was flagged off by Koderma MP Annpurna Devi on 12 September 2023 and regular service commenced from 13 September 2023. As of now it is the only long-distance express train serving the city of Giridih connecting it with the state capital Ranchi, and also the only train running with a Vistadome coach in the state of Jharkhand.

There has been a long-pending demand for a direct train connecting Giridih to Howrah and Patna.

== Nearest airports ==
The nearest airports to Giridih railway station are:

1. Deoghar Airport, Deoghar 71 kilometres (44 mi)
2. Kazi Nazrul Islam Airport, Durgapur 140 kilometres (87 mi)
3. Birsa Munda Airport, Ranchi 185 kilometres (115 mi)
4. Gaya Airport 193 kilometres (120 mi)
5. Lok Nayak Jayaprakash Airport, Patna 243 kilometres (151 mi)
6. Netaji Subhas Chandra Bose International Airport, Kolkata 314 kilometres (195 mi)

== See also ==
- New Giridih railway station
- Madhupur–Giridih–Koderma line
- Madhupur Junction railway station
