= Gorakhpur–Anand Vihar Terminal Humsafar Express (via Basti) =

Gorakhpur - Anand Vihar Terminal Humsafar Express (via Basti)

Overview
- Service type: Express
- First service: 20 December 2016; 8 years ago
- Current operator(s): North Eastern Railways

Route
- Termini: Gorakhpur Junction (GKP); Anand Vihar Terminal (AVNT)
- Stops: 5
- Distance travelled: 770 km (478 mi)
- Average journey time: 12 hours 50 mins
- Service frequency: Tri-weekly (Note: Runs thrice in a week for every direction.)
- Train number(s): 12595 / 12596

On-board services
- Class(es): AC 3 tier
- Seating arrangements: No
- Sleeping arrangements: Yes
- Catering facilities: Available
- Observation facilities: Large windows
- Baggage facilities: Yes
- Other facilities: Yes

Technical
- Rolling stock: LHB Humsafar
- Track gauge: 1,676 mm (5 ft 6 in)
- Operating speed: 62 km/h (39 mph)

Gorakhpur - Anand Vihar Terminal Humsafar Express is a train of the Indian Railways connecting Gorakhpur in Uttar Pradesh to Anand Vihar Terminal in New Delhi. It is currently being operated with 12595/12596 train numbers on a tri-weekly basis. It is the first Hamsafar train.

== Coach composition ==
The train has three-tier AC sleeper cabins designed by Indian Railways. It has an LED screen display to show information about stations, train speed etc. It also has an announcement system; vending machines for tea, coffee and milk; bio toilets in compartments; and CCTV cameras.

== Service ==
It averages 62 km/h as 12595 Humsafar Express starts on Tuesday and covering 770 km in 12 hrs 50 mins & 65 km/h as 12596 Humsafar Express starts on Friday covering 770 km in 11 hrs 50 mins.

== Loco link ==
This train was hauled by a WAP 7 of Ghaziabad for its entire journey.

== Stoppage ==
- Gorakhpur Junction
- Anand Nagar
- Siddharthnagar
- Barhni
- Balrampur
- Gonda Junction
- Lucknow Charbagh
- Kanpur Central
- Anand Vihar Terminal

== See also ==
- Humsafar Express
- Gorakhpur railway station
- Anand Vihar Terminal railway station
- Gorakhpur - Anand Vihar Terminal Humsafar Express (Via Barhni)
