= Madhupur Junction railway station =

Railway station in Jharkhand, India

Madhupur Junction

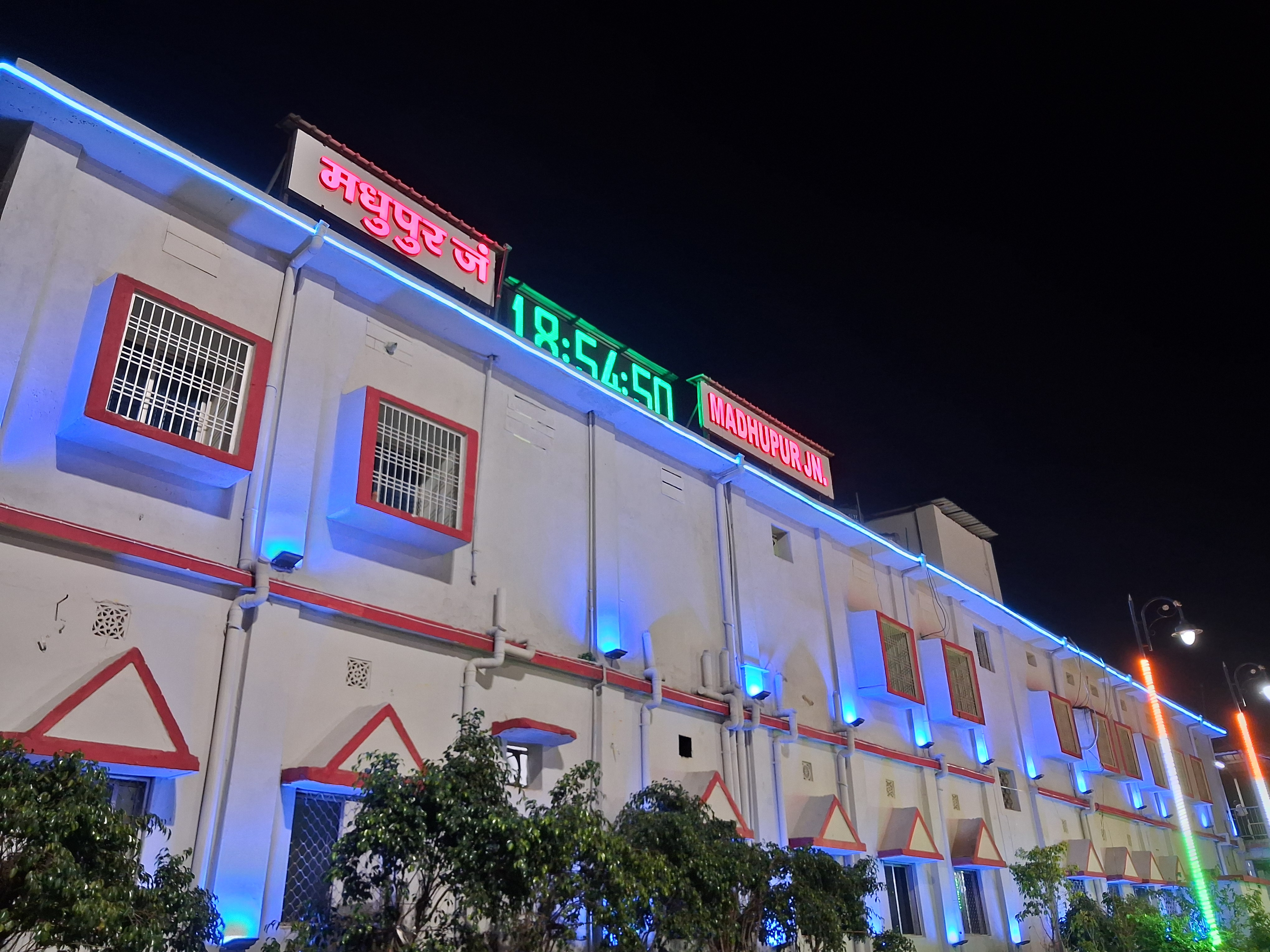
- Entrance view of Madhupur Junction

General information
- Location: Station Road, Madhupur, Deoghar District, Jharkhand; India
- Coordinates: 24°16′14″N 86°38′33″E
- Elevation: 248.327 metres (814.72 ft)
- System: Indian Railways station
- Owner: Indian Railways
- Operator: Eastern Railway
- Lines: Howrah–Delhi main line; Madhupur–Giridih–Koderma line
- Platforms: 4 platforms Length– 650–700 m (2,130–2,300 ft)
- Tracks: 8
- Connections: Auto stand, Bus stand

Construction
- Structure type: At grade
- Parking: Available
- Accessible: Available

Other information
- Status: Active
- Station code: MDP
- Zone(s): Eastern Railway
- Division(s): Asansol
- Classification: NSG-3

History
- Opened: 1871; 155 years ago
- Electrified: 1996–97
- Former names: East Indian Railway
Services
Preceding station	Indian Railways	Following station
Joramow towards Howrah Junction	Eastern Railway zone Howrah–New Delhi main line	Mathurapur towards Delhi Junction
Preceding station	Indian Railways	Following station
Sugapahari towards Koderma Junction	Eastern Railway zone Madhupur-Giridih-Koderma line	Terminus

Other services
Route map
Location
- Location within Jharkhand Location within India
- Interactive map

Madhupur Junction railway station (station code: MDP) is a railway station serving the town of Madhupur in the Deoghar district of the Indian state of Jharkhand. It falls under the jurisdiction of Asansol railway division of Eastern Railway and connects Madhupur and surrounding areas to several major metropolitan cities across India. The station lies on the Howrah–Delhi main line via the Asansol–Patna section and also serves the Madhupur–Giridih–Koderma line, which is a single broad-gauge route spanning 137 kilometres (85 mi). The station has four platforms and handles multiple categories of daily services, from EMU and passenger trains to express and superfast trains.

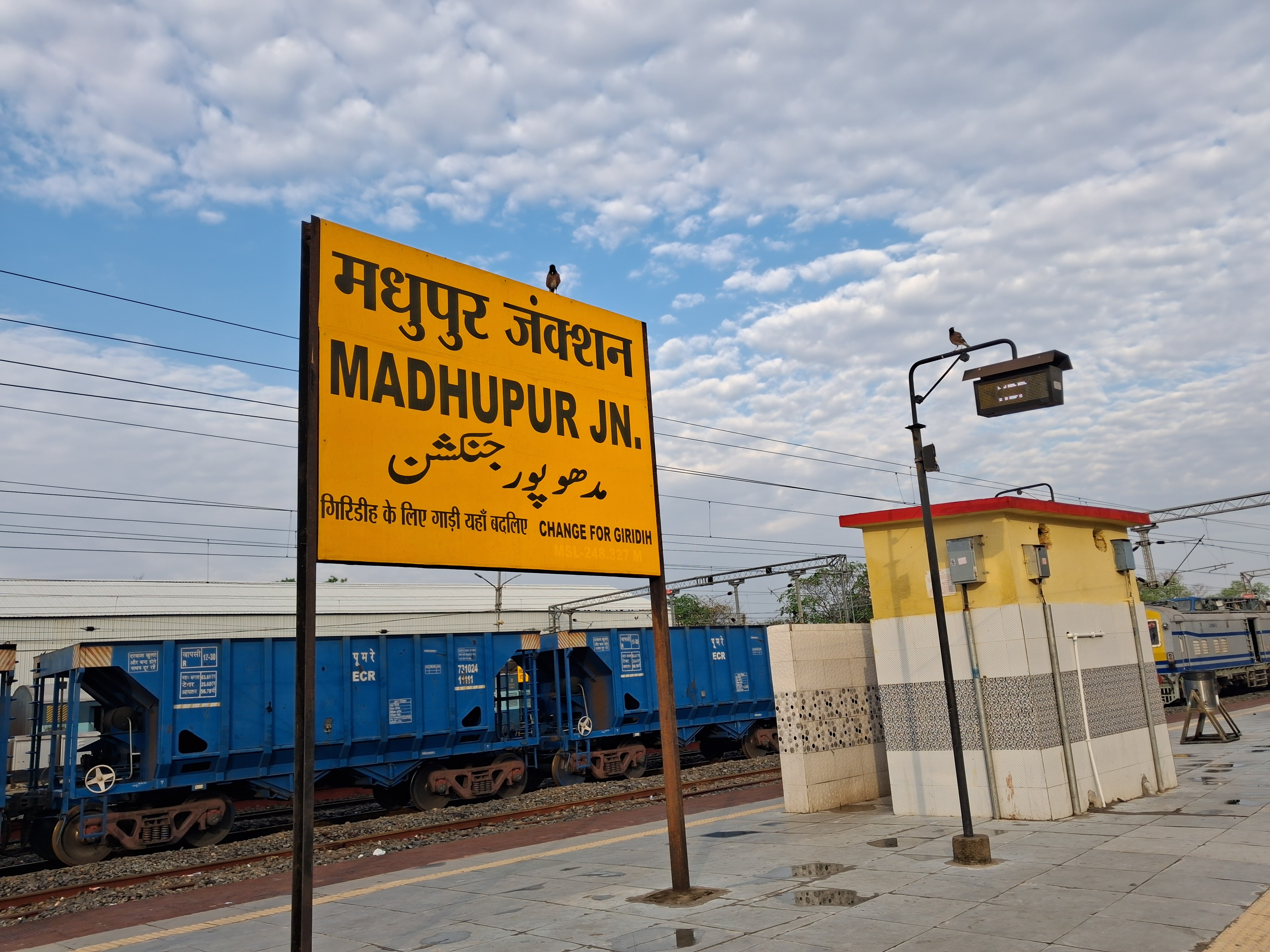

== Administration ==
Madhupur Junction is administered by the Asansol railway division of the Eastern Railway zone (ER) of Indian Railways. The station falls under the operational jurisdiction of the Divisional Railway Manager (DRM), Asansol.

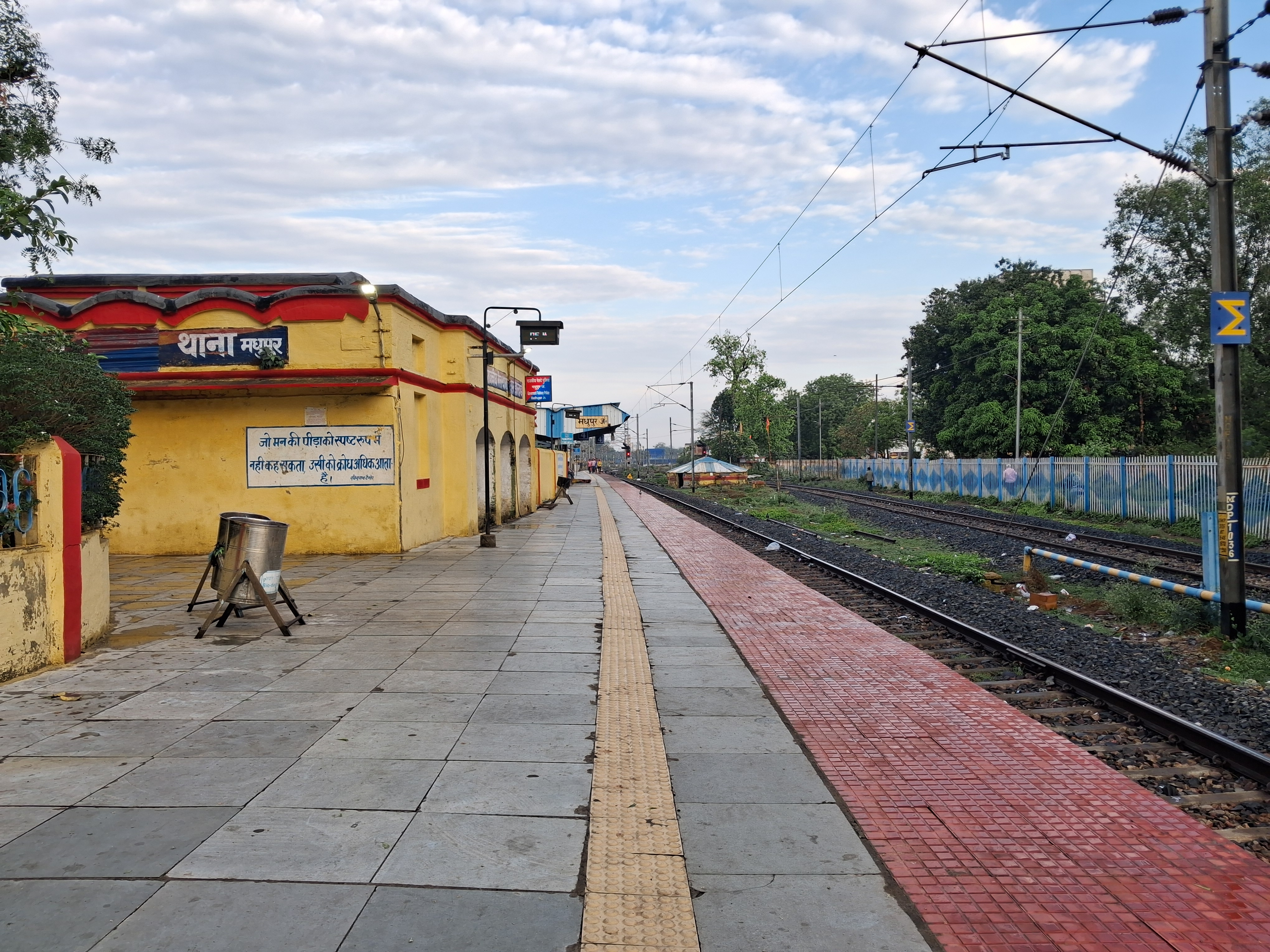

== Facilities ==
The station has been redeveloped under the Amrit Bharat Station Scheme, with significant upgrades to passenger amenities and infrastructure.

The major facilities available include waiting rooms, computerized reservation facility, reservation counters, and two-wheeler and four-wheeler parking. Vehicles are allowed to enter the station premises. The station also has toilets, refreshment rooms, tea stalls and book stalls.

Following redevelopment, the station has been equipped with modern amenities including lifts and escalators for improved accessibility, a new foot overbridge and air-conditioned retiring rooms for passengers. A new booking complex with modern ticketing counters has been developed, along with improved signage systems and passenger information displays. Circulating areas have been expanded with better traffic management and parking facilities.

Platform infrastructure has been upgraded with improved shelters, renovation works and enhanced lighting and electrical fittings. The station also includes a washing pit for maintenance and cleaning of coaches. Additional improvements include modernized station buildings and improved passenger movement facilities such as foot overbridges.

=== Platforms ===
There are four platforms. One is on the terminal line from Giridih and Koderma Junction on the Madhupur–Giridih–Koderma line and is used exclusively for the trains from Koderma & Giridih. The platforms are connected by two foot overbridges, and can now be accessed via stairs, slopes for trolleys, as well as escalators and lifts.

=== Station layout ===
G	Ticket counter	Street level
G	Exit/Entrance	Track 1 Slip line
G	Exit/Entrance	Track 2 towards → Giridih & Koderma Jn.
G	Exit/Entrance	PF 1 Island platform
PF 2	FOB, Side platform
	Track 3	Chittaranjan ← towards → Jasidih
	Track 4	for freight trains
	Track 5	Chittaranjan ← towards → Jasidih
PF 3	FOB, Island platform
PF 4	Island platform
	Track 6	Chittaranjan ← towards → Jasidih
	Track 7	for freight trains

== Trains ==
Majority of the trains stops at Madhupur Junction which runs on Asansol–Patna section of the Howrah–Delhi main line including premium trains such as Rajdhani Express.

Following are the dedicated trains starting from Madhupur running on the Howrah–Delhi main line:

S. No.	Train no.	Train name	Zonal Railway
1	12235	Madhupur–Anand Vihar Terminal Humsafar Express	NR
2	22459	Baba Baidyanathdham Deoghar Humsafar Express	NR
3	22465	Baba Baidyanathdham Deoghar Superfast Express	NR

Following are the trains to/from Madhupur running on the Madhupur–Giridih–Koderma line:

S. No.	Train no.	Train name	Zonal Railway
1	53511	Madhupur–Giridih Passenger	ER
2	53512	Giridih–Madhupur Passenger	ER
3	53513	Madhupur–Giridih Passenger	ER
4	53514	Giridih–Madhupur Passenger	ER
5	53515	Madhupur–Giridih Passenger	ER
6	53516	Giridih–Madhupur Passenger	ER
7	53517	Madhupur–Giridih Passenger	ER
8	53518	Giridih–Madhupur Passenger	ER
9	53519	Madhupur–Giridih Passenger	ER
10	53520	Giridih–Madhupur Passenger	ER
11	53369	Madhupur–Koderma Passenger	ECR
12	53370	Koderma–Madhupur Passenger	ECR

== Further expansion ==
The Ministry of Railways sanctioned a final location survey for the 7.54 km long Madhupur bypass line in February 2020, aimed at enabling trains from Jasidih to reach Giridih and Koderma without loco reversal at Madhupur Junction, thereby avoiding delays of over 30 minutes. The estimated cost of the project is ₹140 crore. The foundation stone for the bypass line was laid by Prime Minister Narendra Modi on 15 September 2024 via video conferencing from Ranchi, as part of a programme inaugurating multiple railway projects worth in Jharkhand. Once completed, the bypass is expected to reduce train detention on the Howrah–Delhi mainline and shorten travel time between Giridih and Jasidih.

== Further extension ==
As of the latest available information, no further extension beyond the currently proposed bypass alignment has been officially sanctioned.

== Nearest airports ==
The nearest airports to Madhupur Junction are:

- Deoghar Airport, Jharkhand – 26 kilometres (16 mi)
- Kazi Nazrul Islam Airport, Durgapur – 119 kilometres (74 mi)
- Gaya Airport, Bihar – 225 kilometres (140 mi)
- Birsa Munda Airport, Ranchi – 233 kilometres (145 mi)
- Lok Nayak Jayaprakash Airport, Patna – 284 kilometres (176 mi)
- Netaji Subhash Chandra Bose International Airport, Kolkata – 293 kilometres (182 mi)

== Gallery ==
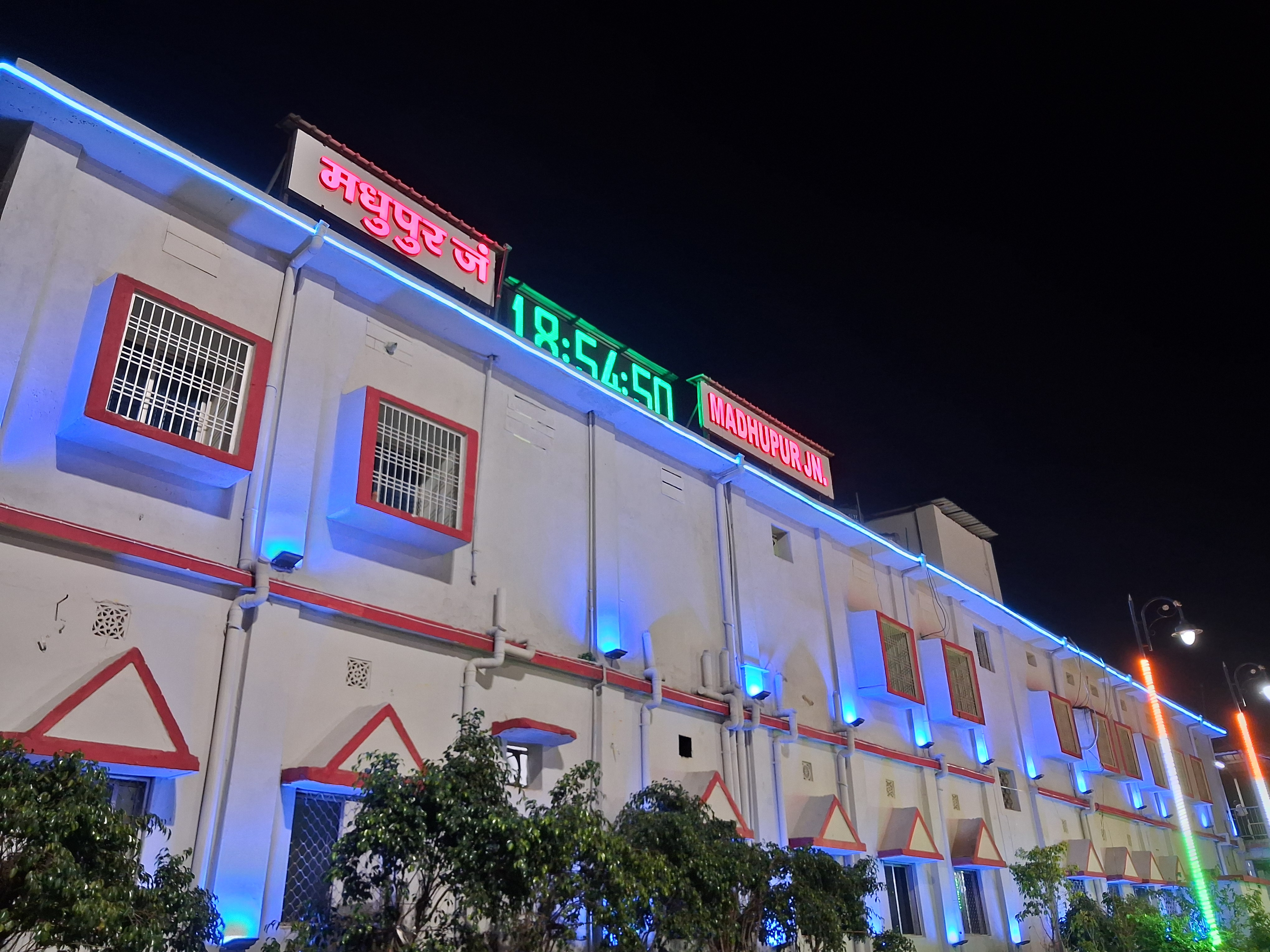
Entrance of Madhupur Junction

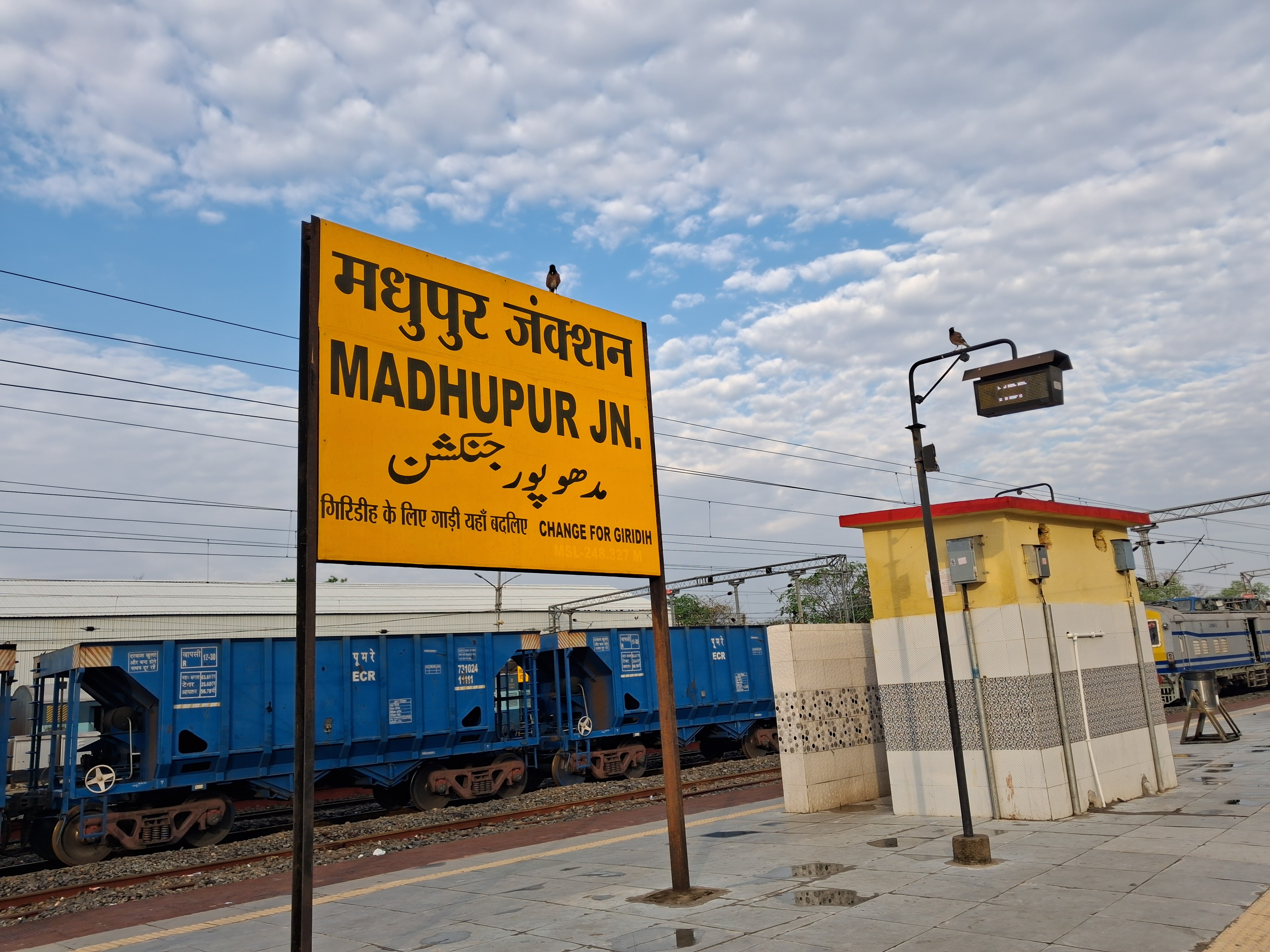
Madhupur Junction signboard

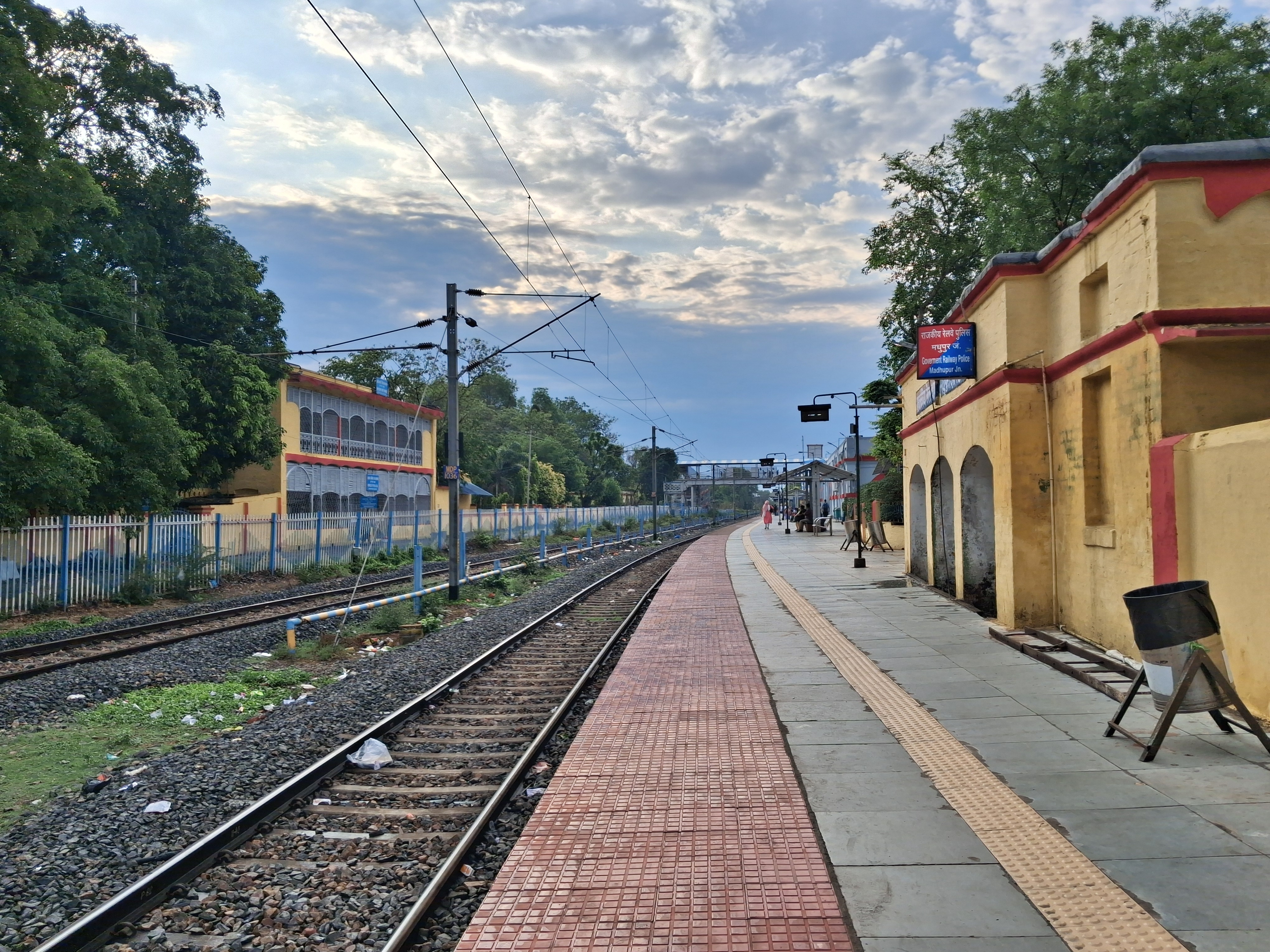
Platform No 4

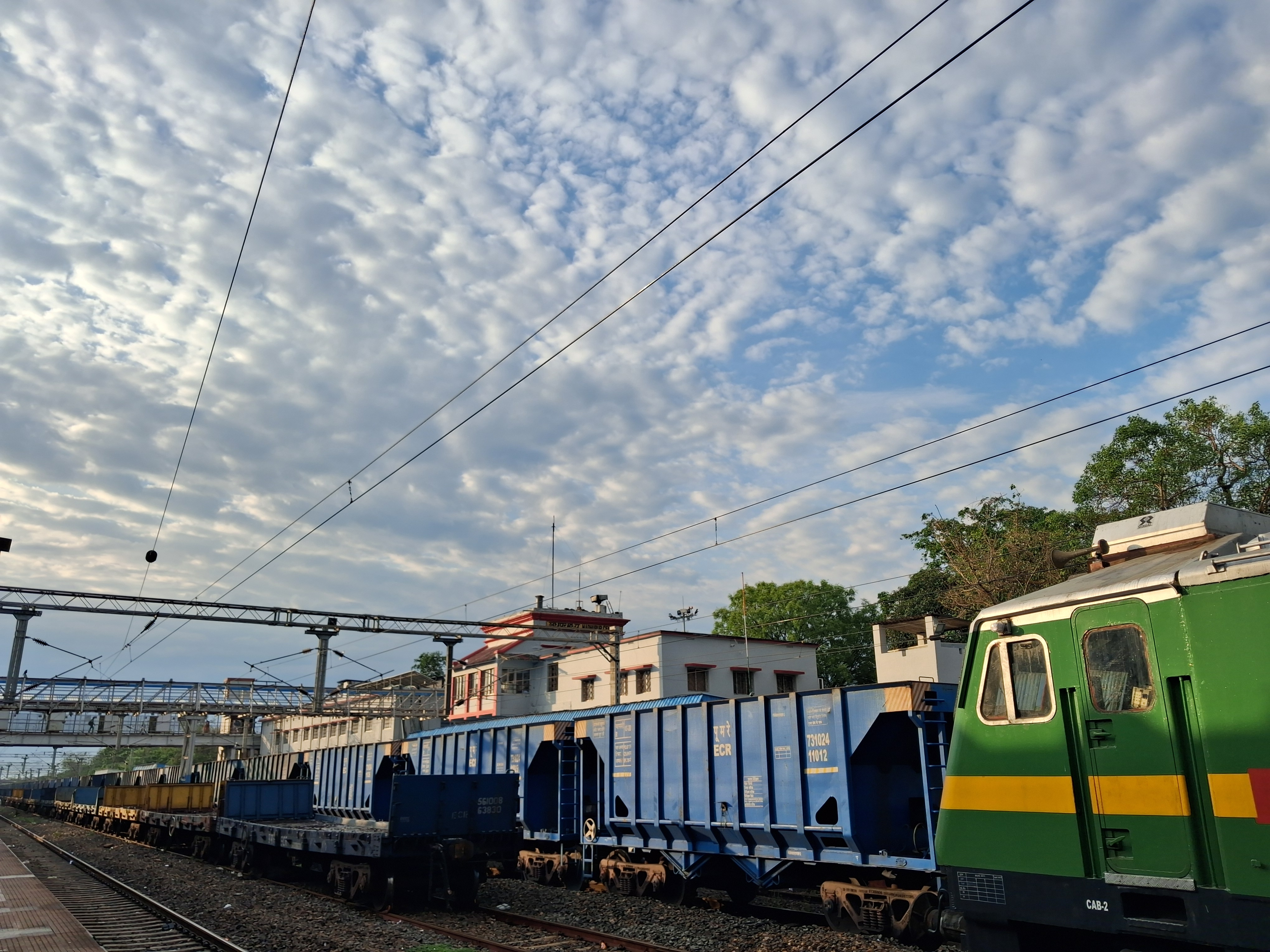
View of Madhupur Junction Central Cabin from Platform No 3

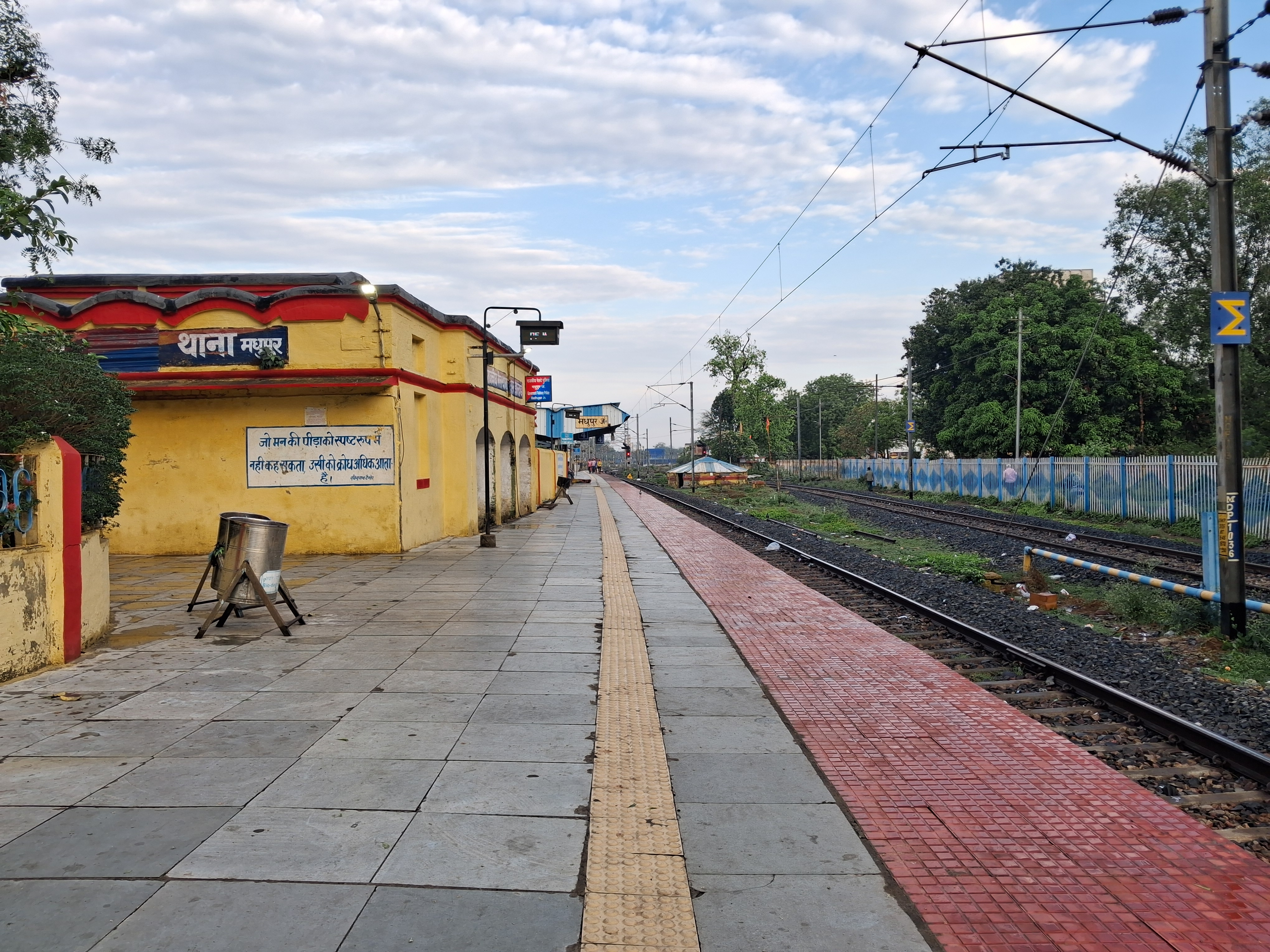
Platform No 4

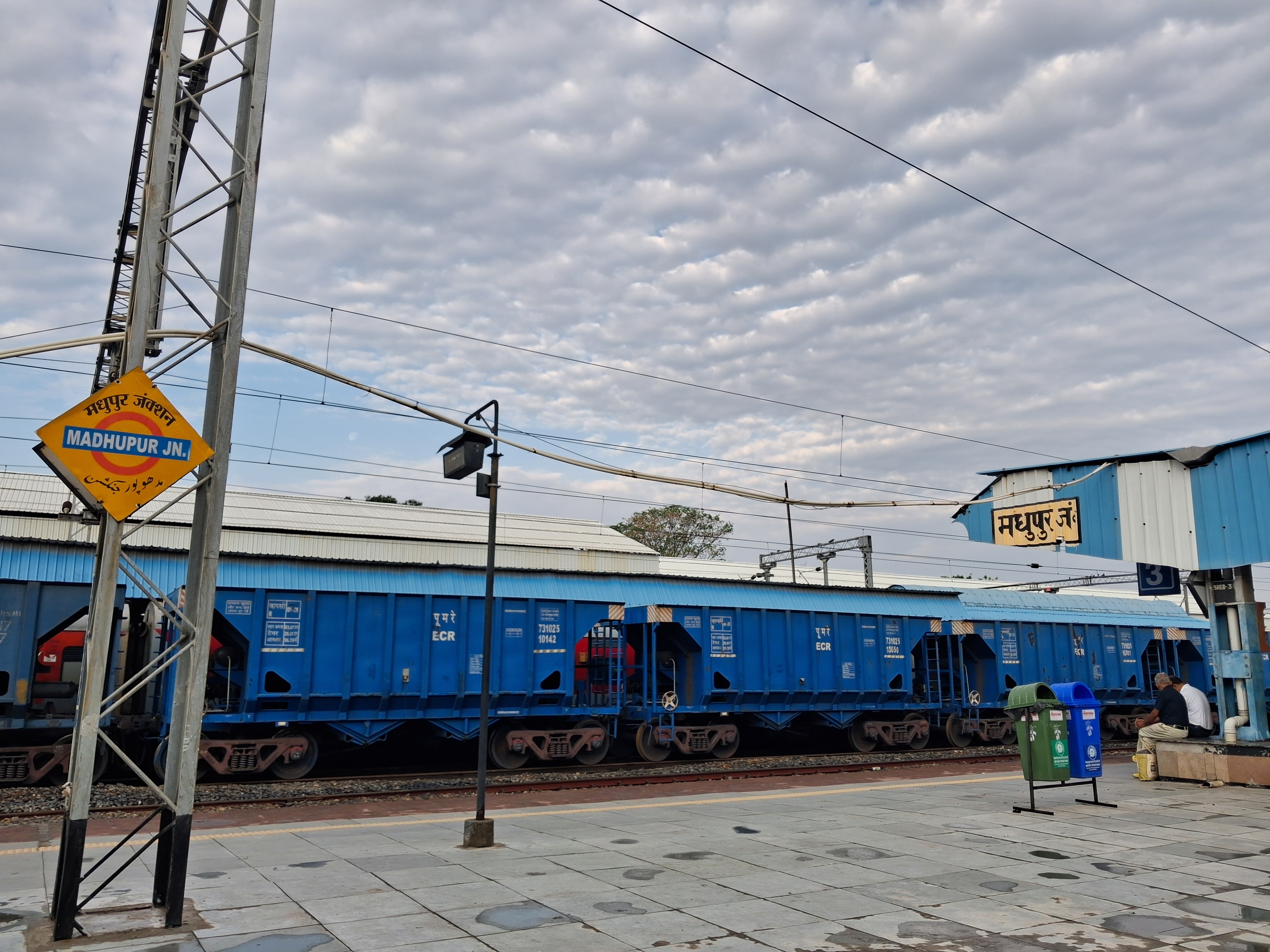
Platform No 3

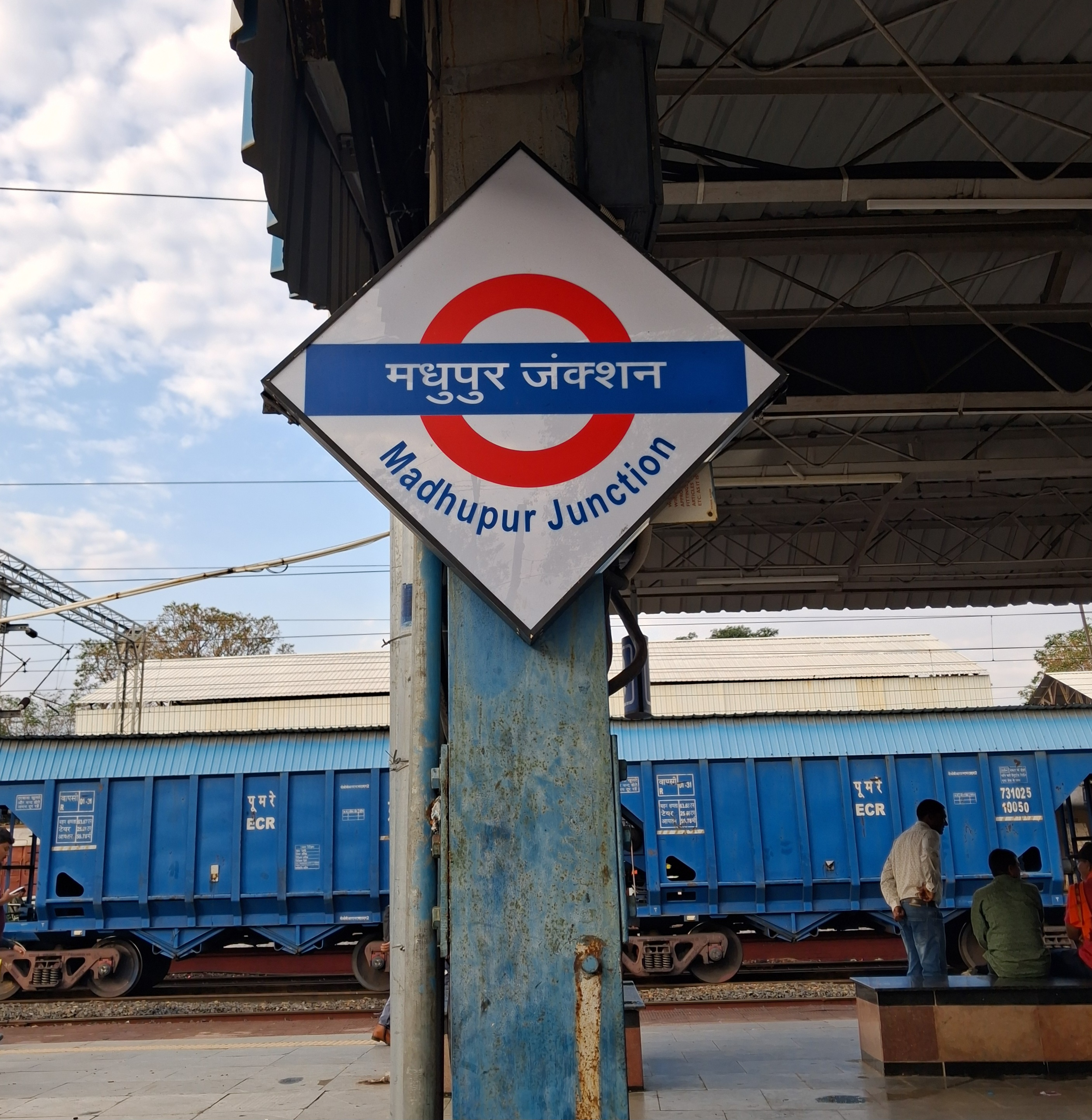
Signboard

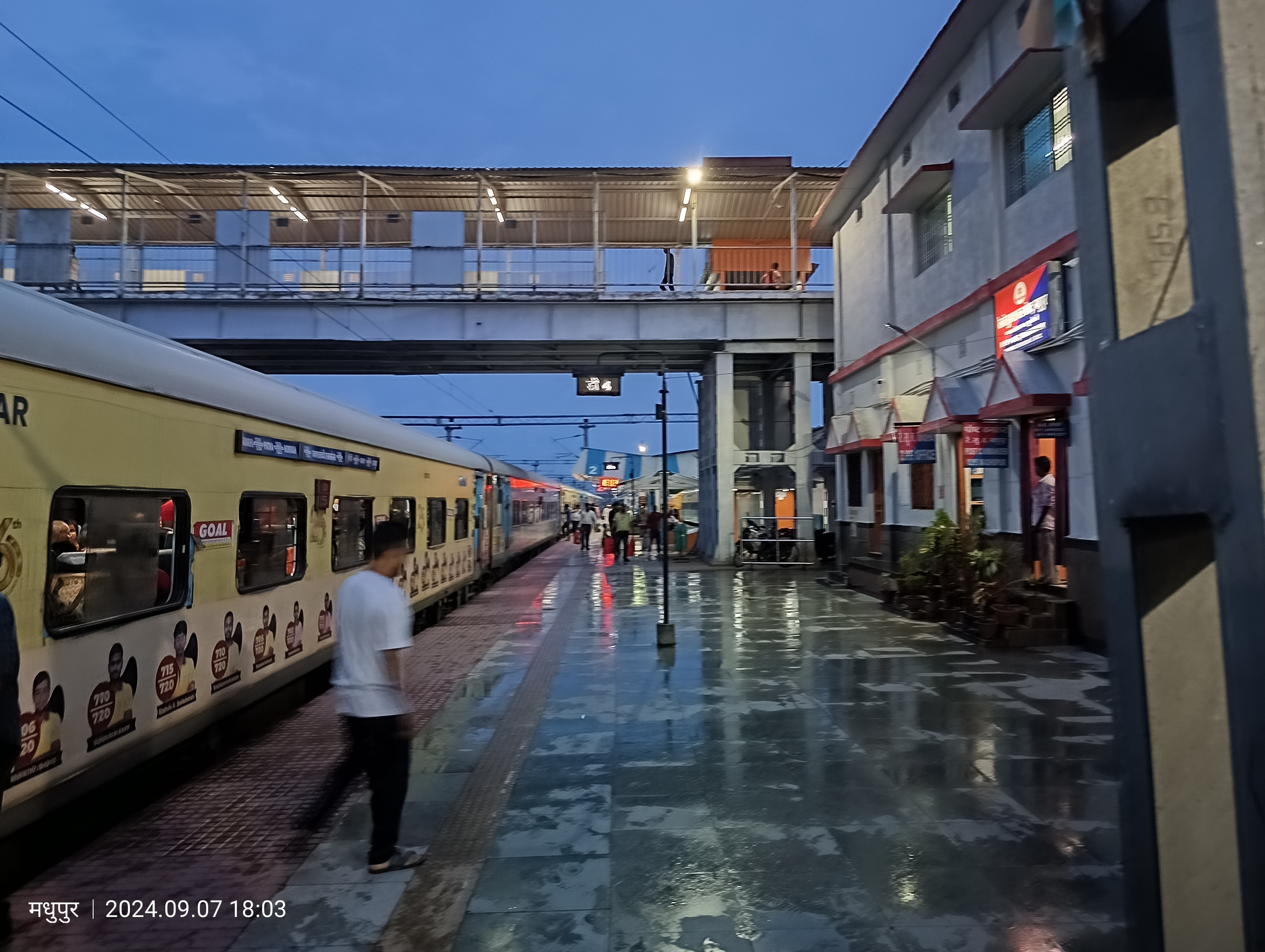
Platform No 2

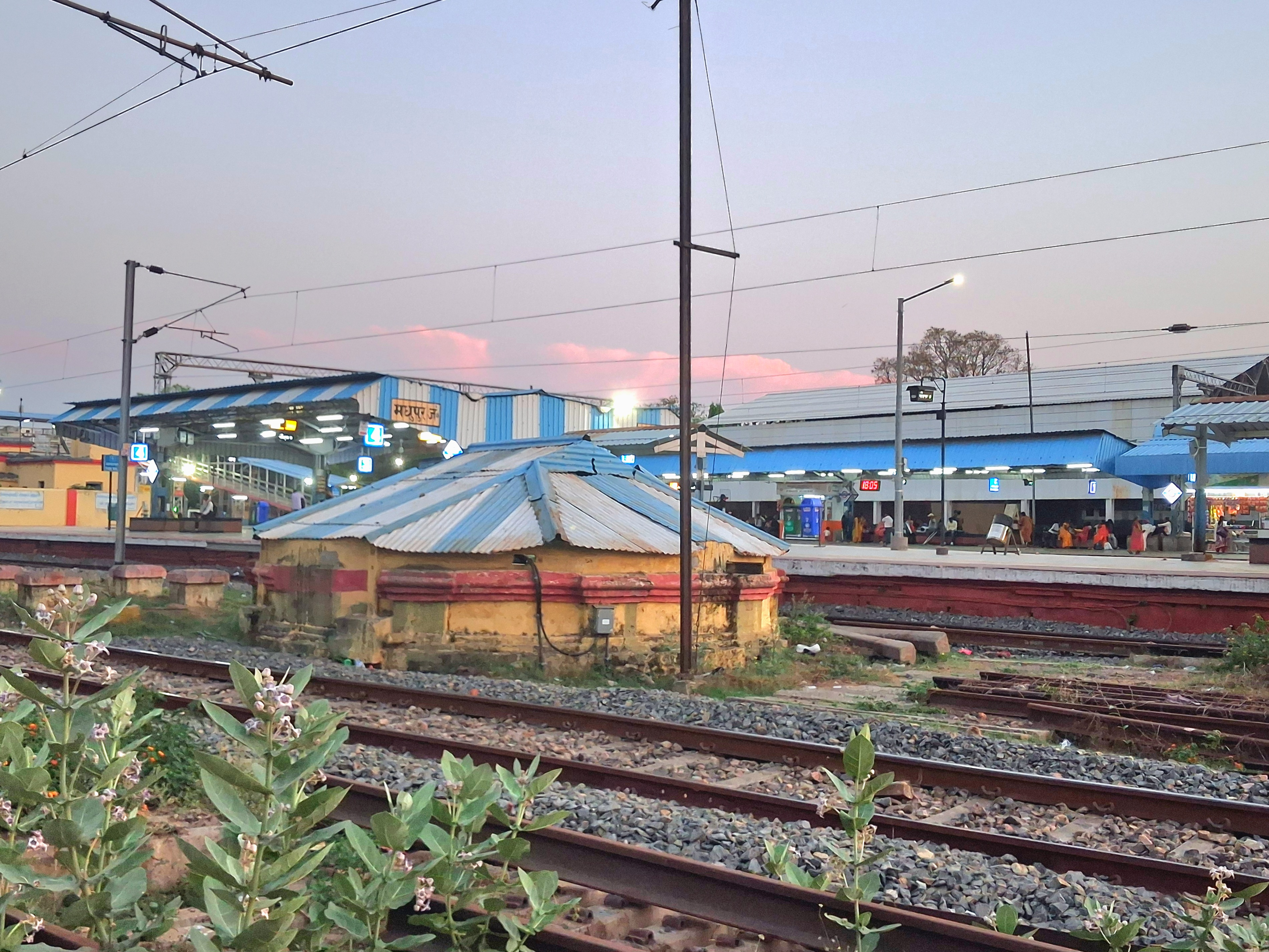
A century-old well at Madhupur Junction

== See also ==
- Eastern Railway zone
- Asansol railway division
- New Delhi–Howrah main line
- Asansol–Patna section
- Jasidih Junction railway station
- Giridih
