= Madhupur–Anand Vihar Terminal Humsafar Express =

Madhupur - Anand Vihar Terminal Humsafar Express
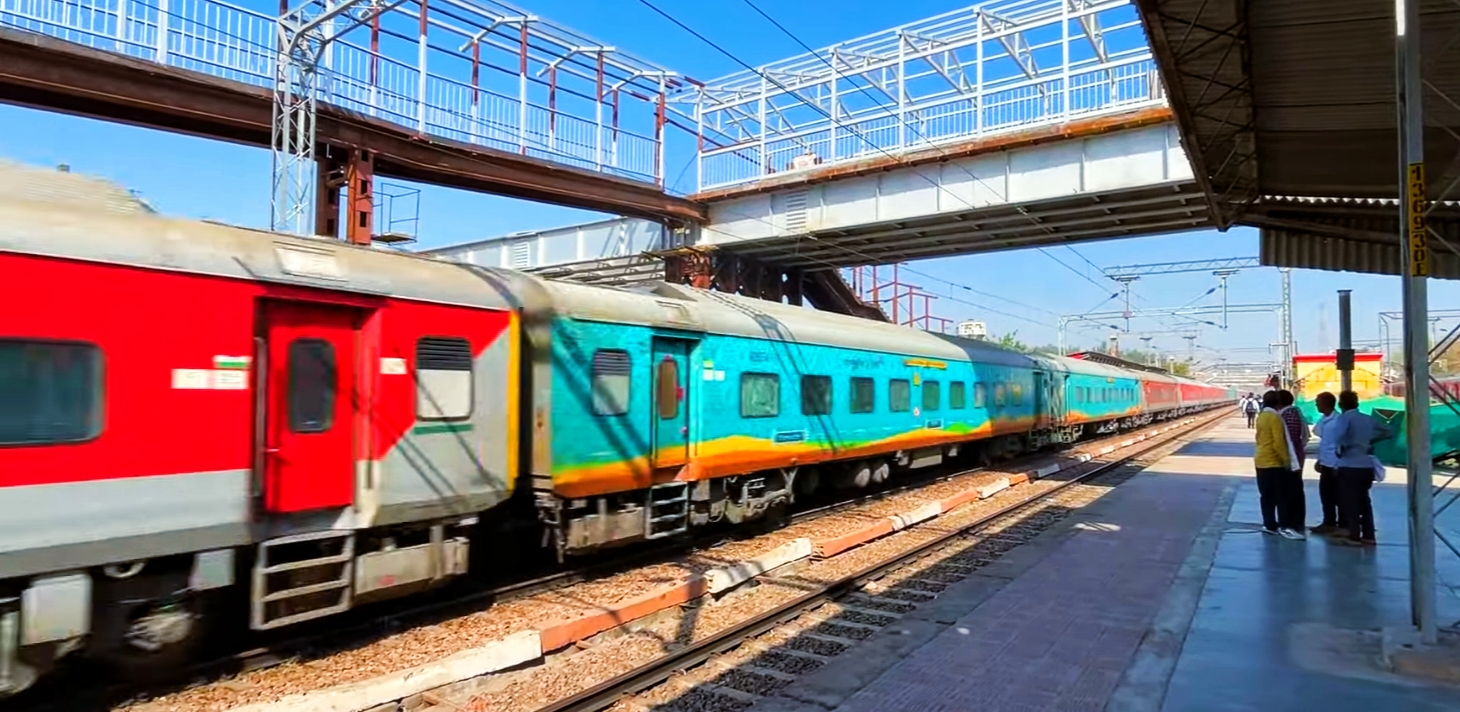
- Madhupur - Anand Vihar Terminal Humsafar Express At Khurja Junction

Overview
- Service type: Humsafar Express
- First service: 15 February 2019; 6 years ago
- Current operator: Northern Railways

Route
- Termini: Madhupur Junction (MDP); Anand Vihar Terminal (ANVT)
- Stops: 10
- Distance travelled: 1,236 km (768 mi)
- Average journey time: 17h 00m
- Service frequency: Weekly (Note: Runs one days in a week for every direction.)
- Train number: 12235 / 12236

On-board services
- Classes: AC 3 tier, AC 3 tier Economy, Sleeper Class
- Seating arrangements: Yes
- Sleeping arrangements: Yes
- Catering facilities: Available
- Observation facilities: Large windows

Technical
- Rolling stock: LHB Humsafar
- Track gauge: 1,676 mm (5 ft 6 in)
- Operating speed: 73 km/h (45 mph) Avg. Speed

The 12235/12236 Madhupur - Anand Vihar Terminal Humsafar Express is a superfast train from Humsafar Express category belonging to Northern Railway zone that runs between Madhupur Junction and Anand Vihar Terminal of Delhi.

It is currently being operated with 12235/12236 train numbers on a weekly basis.

== Coach composition ==
The trains have 3-tier AC and sleeper class type booking options. The trains are designed by Indian Railways with features of LED screen display to show information about stations, train speed etc. and will have announcement system as well, Vending machines for tea, coffee and milk, Bio toilets in compartments as well as CCTV cameras.

== Service ==
The 12235/Madhupur - Anand Vihar Terminal Humsafar Express has an average speed of 72 km/h and covers 1233 km in 17h 45m.

The 12236/Anand Vihar Terminal - Madhupur Humsafar Express has an average speed of 73 km/h and covers 1233 km in 16h 55m.

== Route and halts ==
- Madhupur Junction
- Jasidih Junction
- Jhajha
- Kiul Junction
- Mokama
- Patna Junction
- Ara Junction
- Buxar
- Pt. DD Upadhyaya Junction (Mughalsarai)
- Allahabad Junction
- Kanpur Central
- Anand Vihar Terminal

== Schedule ==
Train Number	Station Code	Departure Station	Departure Time	Departure Day	Arrival Station	Arrival Time	Arrival Day
22465	MDP	Madhupur Junction	12:15 PM	Thu	Anand Vihar Terminal	06:25 AM	Fri
22466	ANVT	Anand Vihar Terminal	12:45 PM	Wed	Madhupur Junction	05:35 AM	Thu

== Traction ==
Both trains are hauled by WAP 5 / WAP 7 locomotive of Ghaziabad loco shed on its entire journey.

== See also ==
- Humsafar Express
- Madhupur Junction railway station
- Anand Vihar Terminal railway station
