= Humsafar Express =

Series of premium AC train service by Indian Railways

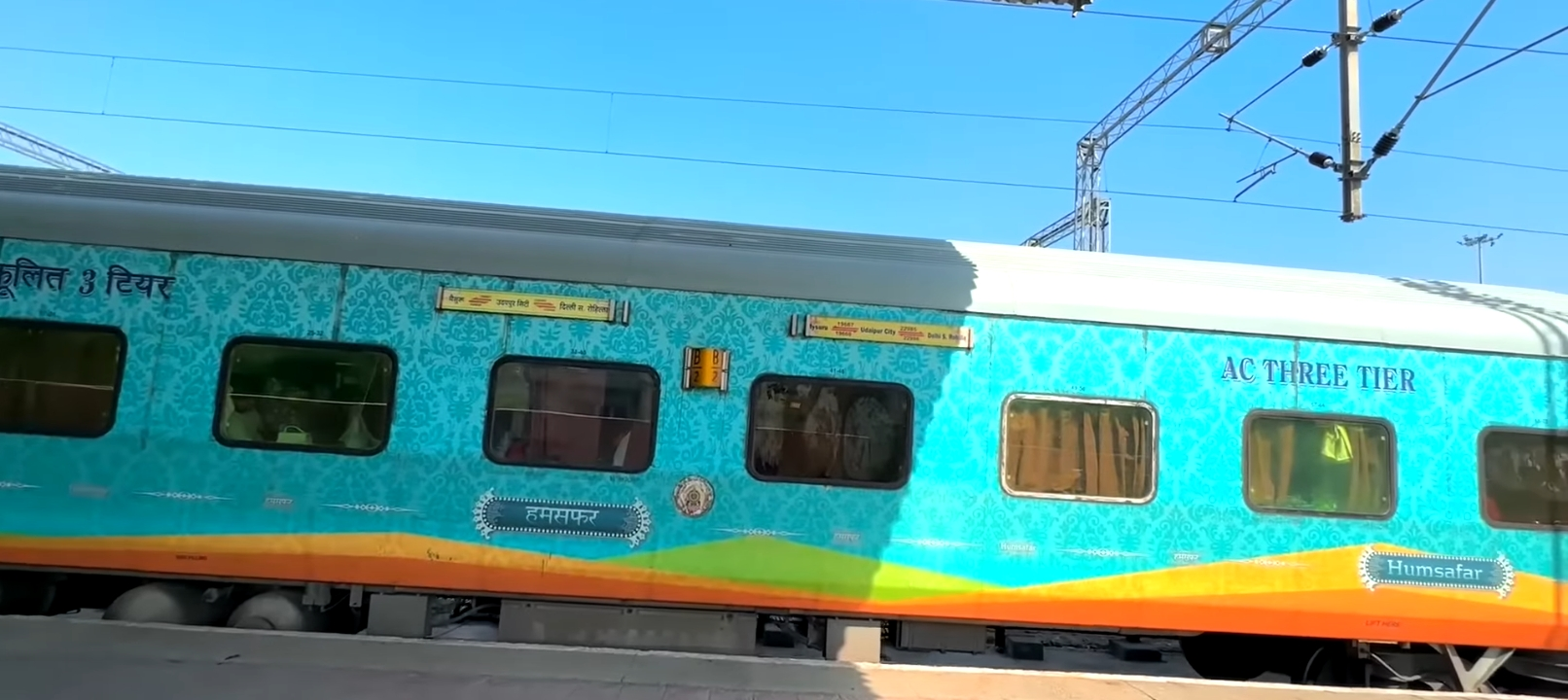
- Mysuru - Udaipur City Palace Queen Humsafar Express at Rewari Junction

Overview
- Service type: Superfast
- Status: Active
- First service: 16 December 2016; 9 years ago
- Current operators: Indian Railways and IRCTC
- Website: http://indianrail.gov.in

On-board services
- Classes: 3A, SL, 3E
- Seating arrangements: Yes
- Sleeping arrangements: Yes
- Catering facilities: On-board catering vending machines E-catering
- Observation facilities: Large windows in all carriages, operated by both state and private operators.
- Entertainment facilities: Reading lights Electric & USB outlets
- Baggage facilities: Underseat
- Other facilities: Smoke alarms CCTV cameras Baby changing table Odour-control system Passenger information system

Technical
- Rolling stock: LHB rake
- Track gauge: 5 ft 6 in (1,676 mm) broad gauge
- Operating speed: 130 km/h
- Track owner: Indian Railways

Humsafar Express is a fully premium service with AC-3 Tier and Sleeper class accommodation having all the modern facilities designed and operated by Indian Railways. "Humsafar" is an Urdu word meaning "co-passenger" The first service was inaugurated on 16 December 2016 between Gorakhpur and Anand Vihar Terminal, New Delhi. The fares of Humsafar Express at the time of launch are around 15–20% higher compared to normal AC-3 tier and Sleeper class fares.

== Features ==
The features included for its fleets are:

- In the month of September 2019, Railways decided to add Sleeper class to provide better service to middle class passengers.
- Railways has added a changing table for babies in the toilet.
- Vending machines are installed for tea, coffee and milk.
- 110 V DC electric ports and USB ports are provided for each passenger.
- Reading lights for each passenger.
- More comfortable berths than the previous 3-tier AC sleeper rakes.
- Seat-number stickers are braille-integrated.
- Each compartment has Bio-toilets fitted for proper disposal of human waste.
- The exterior of coaches has a futuristic look with the use of Vinyl sheets.
- GPS-based passenger information system at each end of the coach to display speed and station information on LED displays with voice announcements.
- Compartments are equipped with smoke alarms and CCTV cameras to enhance passenger security.
- Heating chamber and refrigerating box are installed in each coach to preserve the food that was brought from home by the passengers.
- Curtains to maintain privacy and a dustbin to maintain cleanliness is provided in each cabin.
- Each coach has three odour control systems fitted across the aisle.
- Automatic doors
- Khadi bedrolls are provided.
- It has 1.15 times the fare of AC Super fast Express

However most of these Humsafar trains run with regular 3AC coaches without these enhancements. There are only a few trains that run with Humsafar coaches.

== Traction ==
Some Humsafar Express trains run by both diesel and electric locomotives, diesel locomotives like WDP-4 , WDM-3D and WDM-3A. Electric locomotives like WAP-4 , WAP-5 or WAG-5 and most popular of all WAP-7.

== Active services ==
Sr. no.	Train name	Train no.	Zone	Frequency	Inauguration	Distance	Travel Time	Avg speed
1	Gorakhpur–Anand Vihar Terminal Humsafar Express (via Barhni)	12571/12572	NER	Four times a week	16 December 2016	839 km	13 h 50 m	61 km/h
2	Gorakhpur–Anand Vihar Terminal Humsafar Express (via Basti)	12595/12596	NER	Tri-weekly	20 December 2016	770 km	12 h 50 m	62 km/h
3	Agartala–SMVT Bengaluru Humsafar Express	12503/12504	NFR	Bi-weekly	30 December 2016	3,529 km	62 h 40 min	65.66 km/h
4	Howrah–SMVT Bengaluru Humsafar Express	22887/22888	SER	Weekly	20 January 2017	1,953 km	31h 20m	62 km/h
5	Sri Ganganagar–Tiruchirappalli Humsafar Express	22497/22498	NWR	Weekly	27 February 2017	3,116 km	58h 25m	53.2 km/h
6	Durg–Hazrat Nizamuddin Humsafar Express	22867/22868	SECR	Bi-weekly	22 April 2017	1280 km	21 h 20 m	60 km/h
7	Chennai–Ahmedabad Humsafar Express	22919/22920	WR	Weekly	4 May 2017	1,727 km	29 h, 30 min	59 km/h
8	Tirupati–Jammu Tawi Humsafar Express	22705/22706	SCoR	Weekly	15 June 2017	2,985 km	51 h 55 m	57 km/h
9	Howrah–Tirupati Humsafar Express	20889/20890	SER	Weekly	17 June 2017	1,617 km	26 h 5 m	65 km/h
10	Bhubaneswar–SMVT Bengaluru Humsafar Express	22833/22834	ECoR	Weekly	13 July 2017	1,512 km	25h 0m	60 km/h
11	Bandra Terminus–Saharsa Humsafar Express	22913/22914	WR	Weekly	13 August 2017	2,060 km	39h 00m	55 km/h
12	Udaipur City–Delhi Sarai Rohilla Rajasthan Humsafar Express	22985/22986	NWR	Weekly	24 February 2018	732 km	12 h 45 m	62 km/h
13	Udaipur City–Mysuru Palace Queen Humsafar Express	19667/19668	NWR	Weekly	26 February 2018	2,256 km	43h 45m	53 km/h
14	Champaran Humsafar Express	15705/15706	NFR	Bi-weekly	10 April 2018	1,473 km	29h 50m	49 km/h
15	Prayagraj–Anand Vihar Terminal Humsafar Express	22437/22438	NCR	Tri-weekly	9 May 2018	622 km	7h 55m	79 km/h
16	Indore–Puri Humsafar Express	20917/20918	WR	Weekly	12 May 2018	1,602 km	30 h 45 m	51 km/h
17	Bhagat Ki Kothi–Thiruchchirappalli Humsafar Express	20481/20482	NWR	Weekly	14 May 2018	2,816 km	47 h 50 m	59 km/h
18	Lingampalli–Indore Humsafar Express	20915/20916	WR	Weekly	27 May 2018	1,543 km	26 h, 15 min	59 km/h
19	Bandra Terminus–Bhagat Ki Kothi Humsafar Express	20943/20944	WR	Weekly	2 June 2018	933.4 km	17 h 05 m	55 km/h
20	Sealdah–Jammu Tawi Humsafar Express	22317/22318	ER	Weekly	3 July 2018	1,948 km	34h 15m	57 km/h
21	Tirunelveli–Gandhidham Humsafar Express	20923/20924	WR	Weekly	8 July 2018	2,400 km	45 h 10 m	54 km/h
22	Jabalpur–Santragachi Humsafar Express	20827/20828	SER	Weekly	1 August 2018	1,117 km	19 h 40 m	56 km/h
23	Santragachi–Pune Humsafar Express	20821/20822	SER	Weekly	11 August 2018	2,058 km	31 h 45 m	65 km/h
24	Firozpur –Rameswaram Humsafar Express	20497/20498	NR	Weekly	27 September 2018 Recently extended till firozpur from ajmer (07/10/2023)	3,544 km	60.5 h	57 km/h
25	Hazur Sahib Nanded–Jammu Tawi Humsafar Express	12751/12752	SCR	Weekly	5 October 2018	2,049 km	37h	55 km/h
26	Udaipur City–Patliputra Humsafar Express	19669/19670	NWR	Weekly	5 October 2018	1,565 km	32h 55m	48 km/h
27	Pune–Habibganj Humsafar Express	22171/22172	WCR	Weekly	6 October 2018	890 km	13h 30m	66 km/h
28	Santragachi–Rani Kamalapati Humsafar Express	22169/22170	WCR	Weekly	10 October 2018	1,435 km	25 h 15 m	56 km/h
29	Thiruvananthapuram North–SMVT Bengaluru Humsafar Express	16319/16320	SR	Bi-weekly	20 October 2018	826 km	16h 40m	50 km/h
30	Madhupur–Anand Vihar Terminal Humsafar Express	12235/12236	NR	Weekly	15 February 2019	1,236 km	17h 00m	73 km/h
31	Pune–Ajni Humsafar Express	22139/22140	CR	Weekly	16 February 2019	881 km	15h 30m	56 km/h
32	Patna–SMVT Bengaluru Humsafar Express	22353/22354	ECR	Weekly	2 March 2019	2,690 km	60.5 h	57 km/h
33	Pune–Nagpur Humsafar Express	22141/22142	CR	Weekly	3 March 2019	884 km	48h 15m	60 km/h
34	Bandra Terminus–Jamnagar Humsafar Express	22923/22924	WR	Tri-weekly	4 March 2019	813 km	14 h 30 m	55 km/h
35	Prayagraj–New Delhi Humsafar Express	12275/12276	NCR	Four times a week	13 September 2019	632 km	07 h 40 m	82 km/h
36	Baba Baidyanath Dham Deoghar Humsafar Express	22459/22460	NR	Weekly	14 January 2020	1,233 km	18 h	74 km/h
37	Bandra Terminus–Gorakhpur Humsafar Express	19091/19092	WR	Weekly	1 March 2021	1,977 km	36 h	55 km/h
38	Godda–New Delhi Humsafar Express	12349/12350	ER	Weekly	8 April 2021	1,323 km	22 h 45 m	58 km/h
39	Bandra Terminus–Barmer Humsafar Express	12997/12998	WR	Weekly	3 January 2024	994 km	17h 45m	56 km/h
40	Bandra Terminus–Barmer Humsafar Express	21901/21902	WR	Weekly	5 January 2024	994 km	17h 55m	55 km/h
41	Bhagalpur–Ajmer Humsafar Express	13423/13424	ER	Weekly	6 March 2025	1,749 km	33 h 30 m	52 km/h
42	Sealdah–Jalpaiguri Road Humsafar Express	13115/13116	ER	Weekly	14 June 2025	586 km	12h 20m	47.5 km/h
43	Tirupati–Srikakulam Road Humsafar Express	17439/17440	SCoR	Weekly	13 April 2026	852 km	19h 35m	44 km/h

== See also ==
- Amrit Bharat Express
- Vande Bharat Express
- Rajdhani Express
- Shatabdi Express
- Double Decker Express
- Jan Shatabdi Express
- Sampark Kranti Express
- Jan Sadharan Express
- Tejas Express
- Uday Express
- Mahamana Express
- Antyodaya Express
- Garib Rath Express
- Duronto Express
- Rajya Rani Express
- Vivek Express
- Yuva Express
