= New Giridih railway station =

Railway station in Giridih, India

NEW GIRIDIH

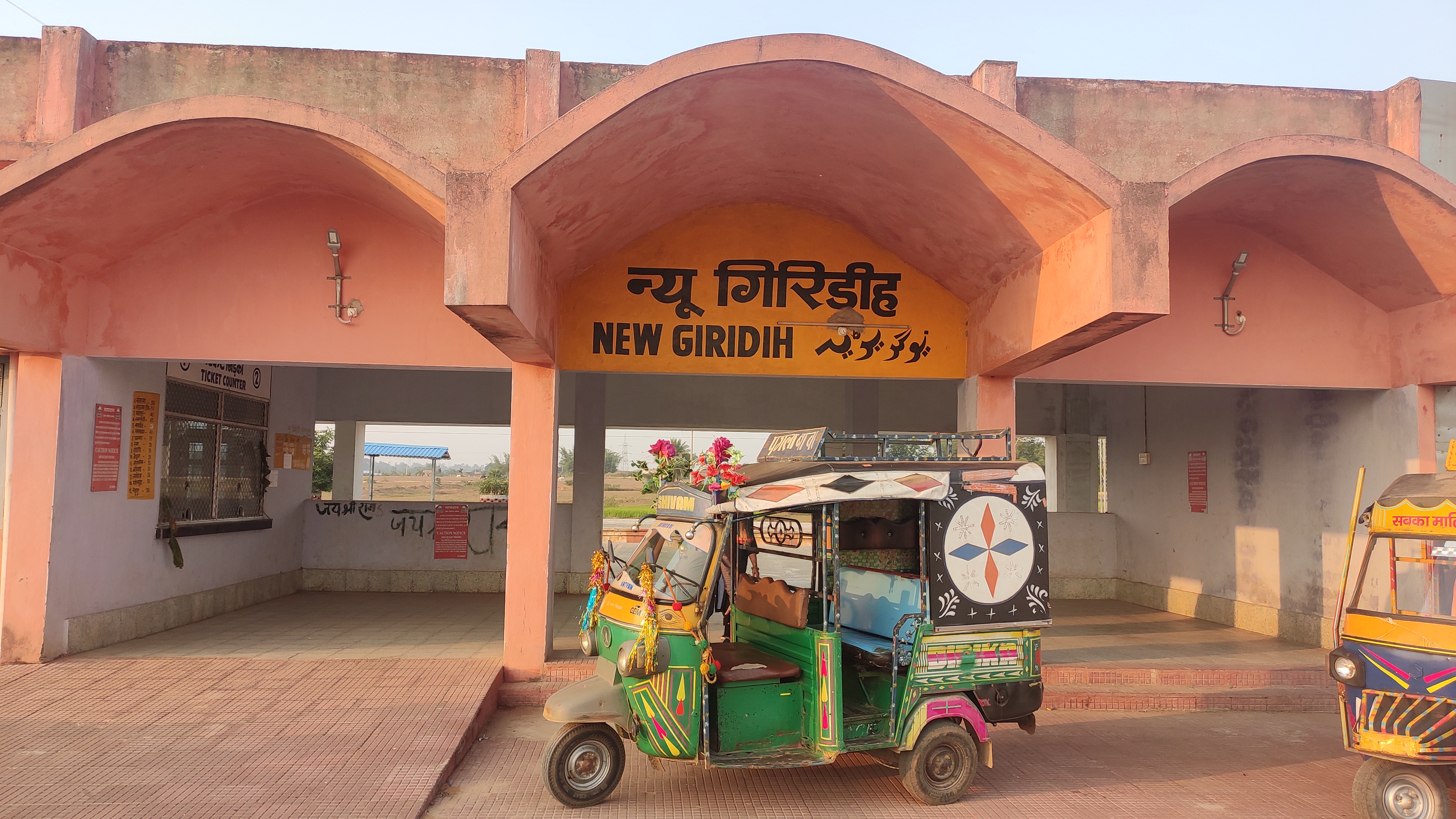
- New Giridih railway station building

General information
- Location: New Giridih Station Road, Gadi, Giridih district, Jharkhand; India
- Coordinates: 24°13′10″N 86°19′23″E
- Elevation: 334 metres (1,096 ft)
- System: Indian Railways station
- Line: Madhupur–Giridih–Koderma line
- Platforms: 3
- Tracks: 4

Construction
- Parking: Available

Other information
- Status: Functional
- Station code: NGRH
- Zone(s): East Central Railway zone
- Division(s): Dhanbad

History
- Opened: 2018; 8 years ago
- Electrified: 2019

Passengers
- 2500+ daily
Location

New Giridih railway station, station code NGRH, is a satellite railway station serving the city of Giridih in the Indian state of Jharkhand apart from the existing main Giridih railway station. It is situated nearby to the Khandoli reservoir-cum-dam in Gadi, near NH-114A.

New Giridih station is a crossing station located in the Koderma–Maheshmunda line of the Dhanbad railway division in the East Central Railway zone of Indian Railways, which is a part of a larger Madhupur–Giridih–Koderma line single-line broad-gauge rail route extending from Koderma up to Madhupur. The total length of the route is 138 kilometres (86 mi). The station has 3 platforms and offers basic amenities like waiting rooms and refreshment stalls. It is a vital transport hub connecting Giridih to major cities in the region. However, the platforms are not well sheltered, and the station lacks many facilities including sanitation and passenger shade.

== History ==
A 110 km (68 mi) track from Koderma to Maheshmunda was constructed. This extended the Madhupur–Giridih railway line to Koderma, effectively making it a Madhupur–Giridih–Koderma line. A new station was built on Maheshmunda–Koderma section named as New Giridih (NGRH) which leaves out the already existing station Giridih (GRD) on this route, also making Maheshmunda a junction station. On 16 February 2019, Eastern Railway in its press-release announced a passenger train service w.e.f. 25 February 2019 from Koderma to Madhupur via New Giridih.

== Further extension ==
There are plans from the Railway ministry to connect Parasnath with New Giridih via Madhuban, for the convenience of the Jain pilgrims visiting Shikharji. construction of which was sanctioned and the project included in the Union Budget 2018–19 at a cost of ₹902.86 Crores on a 50:50 cost sharing basis between the Government of Jharkhand and Indian Railways. The foundation stone for construction was laid in 2019. The 49-km long railway line will have two crossing stations and a couple of halts. During the financial year 2022–23, Indian Railways had allotted ₹50 Crores for the above project for early starting of the project. In a land acquisition application submitted to DLAO/Giridih by DyCE/Con/HZME office, ₹78.27 Crores were demanded for Raiyati land of 26 villages and payment for land acquisition is yet awaited for deposition of fund from Government of Jharkhand.

There are other proposals as well to connect New Giridih with Dhanbad Junction via Tundi and Govindpur, and with Jhajha via Bengabad, Chakai and Sono. The first phase of the Jhajha–New Giridih rail line involves 20 km-long Jhajha–Batia section, the foundation for which was laid in 2019 and which will be constructed at a cost of Rs 496 crore.

== Trains ==
New Giridih railway station handles trains 6 times daily. The passenger trains are run by East Central Railway zone. Following are the trains arriving and departing from New Giridih railway station.

Indian Railways operate the following trains, which stop at this station:

- 13513/14 Asansol-Hatia Express
- 53365/66 Maheshmunda-Koderma Passenger
- 14049/50 Godda-Delhi Weekly Express
- 53369/70 Madhupur-Koderma Passenger

A new express train connecting New Giridih to Ranchi was announced by Koderma MP Annpurna Devi on 6 April 2023 and Indian Railways released an official notification for the same on 23 August 2023. The inaugural run of New Giridih – Ranchi Intercity Express was flagged off by Koderma MP Annpurna Devi on 12 September 2023 and regular service commenced from 13 September 2023. As of now it is the only long-distance express train serving the city of Giridih connecting it with the state capital Ranchi, and also the only train running with a Vistadome coach in the state of Jharkhand.

There has been a long-pending demand for a direct train connecting New Giridih to Howrah and Patna.

== Nearest airports ==
The nearest airports to New Giridih railway station are:

1. Deoghar Airport, Deoghar 62 kilometres (39 mi)
2. Kazi Nazrul Islam Airport, Durgapur 143 kilometres (89 mi)
3. Birsa Munda Airport, Ranchi 197 kilometres (122 mi)
4. Gaya Airport 208 kilometres (129 mi)
5. Lok Nayak Jayaprakash Airport, Patna 281 kilometres (175 mi)
6. Netaji Subhas Chandra Bose International Airport, Kolkata 318 kilometres (198 mi)

== See also ==
- Koderma Junction railway station
