= Tirupati–Puducherry Weekly Express =

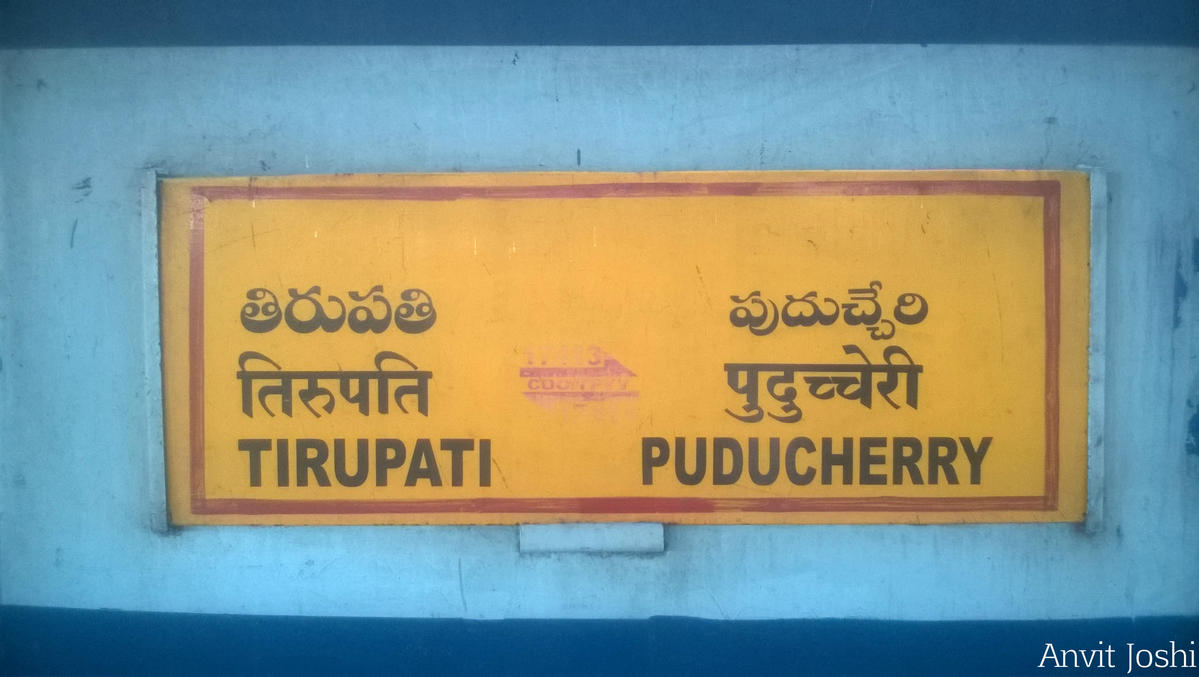

Overview
- Service type: Express
- First service: 17 September 2013; 13 years ago
- Current operator: South Coast Railway zone

Route
- Termini: Tirupati (TPTY); Puducherry (PDY)
- Stops: 9
- Distance travelled: 303 km (188 mi)
- Average journey time: 6h 45m
- Service frequency: Weekly (Note: Runs one day in a week for every direction.)
- Train number: 17413/17414

On-board services
- Classes: AC 2 tier, AC 3 tier, Sleeper class, General Unreserved
- Seating arrangements: No
- Sleeping arrangements: Yes
- Catering facilities: On-board catering E-catering
- Observation facilities: ICF Utkrisht rakes
- Entertainment facilities: No
- Baggage facilities: No
- Other facilities: Below the seats

Technical
- Rolling stock: 2
- Track gauge: 1,676 mm (5 ft 6 in)
- Operating speed: 45 km/h (28 mph), including halts
Route map
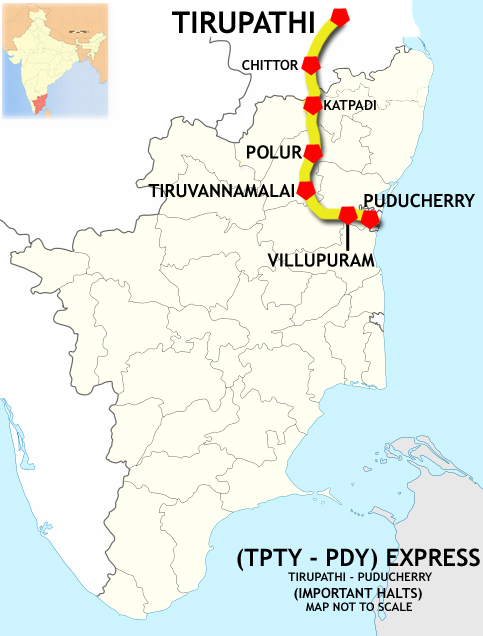

The Tirupati–Puducherry Weekly Express is an Express train belonging to South Central Railway zone that runs between Tirupati and Puducherry in India. It is currently being operated with 17413/17414 train numbers on a weekly basis.

== Service ==
The 17413/Tirupati–Puducherry Weekly Express has an average speed of 45 km/h and covers 303 km in 6h 45m. The 17414/Puducherry–Tirupati Weekly Express has an average speed of 41 km/h and covers 303 km in 7h 25m.

== Route and halts ==
The important halts of the train are:

- Tirupati
- Pakala Junction
- Chittoor
- Katpadi Junction
- Vellore Cantonment
- Arni Road
- Polur
- Tiruvannamalai
- Thirukkovilur
- Viluppuram Junction
- Puducherry

== Coach composition ==
The train has standard ICF rakes with a maximum speed of 110 km/h. The train consists of 10 coaches:

- 8 General Unreserved
- 2 Seating cum Luggage Rake
- 2 sleeper coaches

== Traction ==
Both trains are hauled by an Arakkonam Loco Shed or Erode Loco Shed-based WAP-4 electric locomotive from Tirupati to Puducherry and vice versa.

== Direction reversal ==
The train reverses its direction 1 times:

- Viluppuram Junction

== See also ==
- Tirupati railway station
- Puducherry railway station
