= Prayagraj–New Delhi Humsafar Express =

Premium express train service in India

Prayagraj Junction - New Delhi Humsafar Express
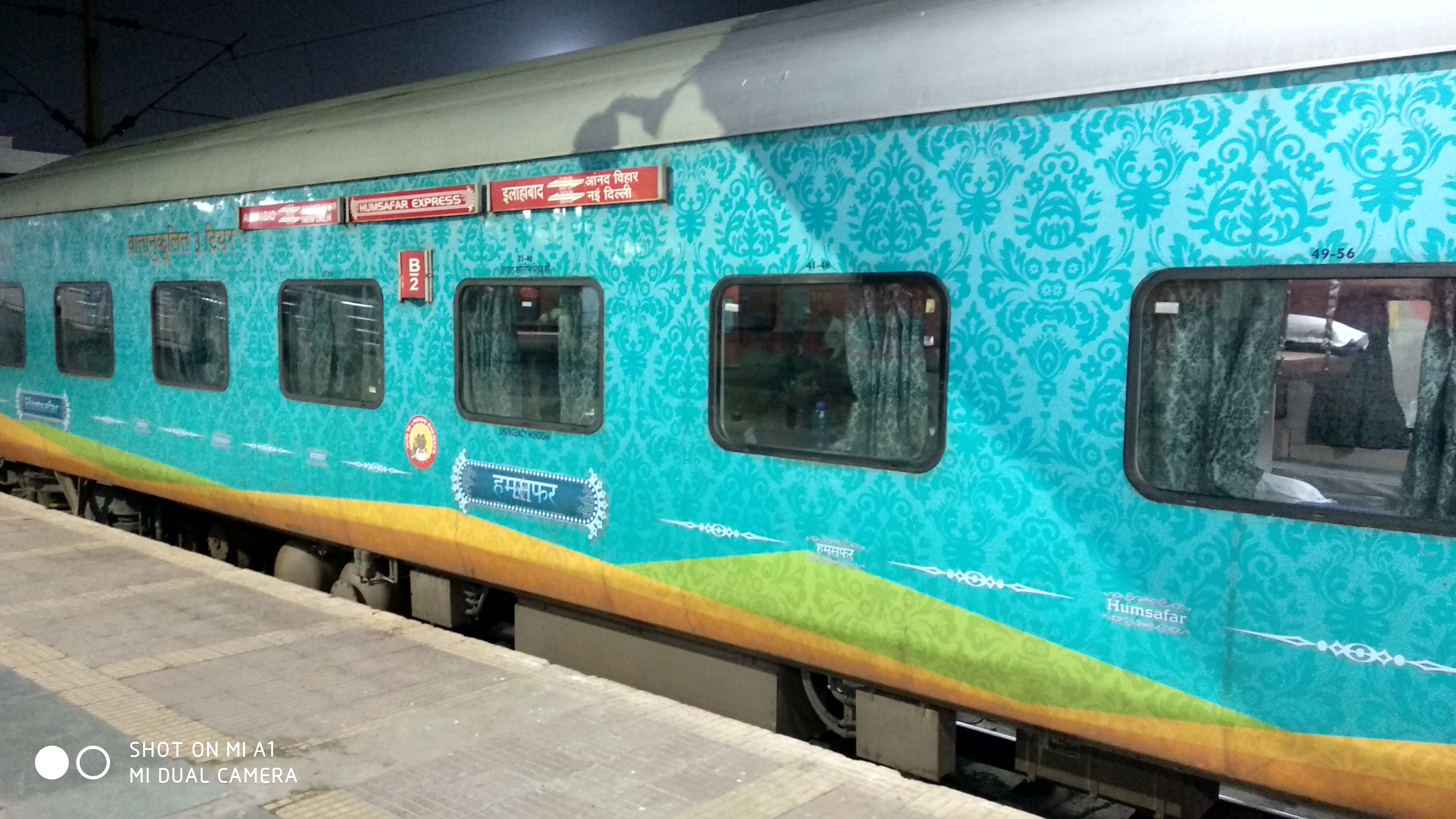
- Prayagraj New Delhi Humsafar Express

Overview
- Service type: Humsafar Express
- First service: 9 February 2010(as 12275 Duronto Express); 13 September 2019 (as 12275 Humsafar Express)
- Current operator: North Central Railways

Route
- Termini: Prayagraj Junction railway station (PRYJ); New Delhi (NDLS)
- Stops: 0
- Distance travelled: 632 km (393 mi)
- Average journey time: 07 hours 40 minutes
- Service frequency: 4 days (Sun, Tue, Thr, Fri)
- Train number: 12275 / 12276

On-board services
- Classes: AC 3 tier, Sleeper Class
- Seating arrangements: No
- Sleeping arrangements: Yes
- Catering facilities: No Pantry Car Coach attached
- Observation facilities: Large windows

Technical
- Rolling stock: LHB Humsafar
- Track gauge: 1,676 mm (5 ft 6 in)
- Operating speed: 130 km/h (81 mph) maximum, 82 km/h (51 mph) average including halts

The 12275 / 12276 Prayagraj Junction railway station - New Delhi Humsafar Express (also known as Prayagraj Humsafar Express) is a Superfast Express train of the Humsafar Express category belonging to Indian Railways - North Central Railway zone that runs between Prayagraj Junction railway station and New Delhi in India. Earlier it used to run as 12275/76 Allahabad - New Delhi Duronto Express of Duronto Express category from 9 February 2010 to 14 September 2019 before being converted to Humsafar Express.

It is operated as train number 12275 from Prayagraj Junction to New Delhi and as train number 12276 in the reverse direction serving the states of Uttar Pradesh and Delhi. It is widely recognized as the only regular Indian Railways train that operates with zero commercial halts between its origin and destination, allowing passenger boarding and deboarding only at the terminal stations.

== Coaches ==
Earlier the 12275 / 76 Allahabad - New Delhi had Duronto Express Coaches. This Train is now replaced with Prayagraj Junction railway station - New Delhi Humsafar Express with effect from 13 September 2019. The train comprises 15 3-tier AC, 4 Sleeper LHB coach along with one generator cars at each end. It has two screens in each coach displaying information about upcoming stations and passenger awareness. It is also equipped with CCTV cameras in each coach to ensure passenger safety. It is the 1st Humsafar Express which is having Sleeper Coaches since Humsafar Express is a full AC 3 Tier Train. These are state of the art coaches and are superior to the previous rake of Duronto Express which is now removed on railways exercise of upgradation and giving passengers a more convenient travel on peak routes.

Coach composition for 12275/12276 :

Loco	1	2	3	4	5	6	7	8	9	10	11	12	13	14	15	16	17	18	19	20	21
	EOG	S1	S2	S3	S4	B1	B2	B3	B4	B5	B6	B7	B8	B9	B10	B11	B12	B13	B14	B15	EOG

== Routeing and technical halts ==
The 12275 / 12276 Prayagraj Junction railway station - New Delhi Humsafar Express has one Technical Halt at Tundla Junction Where Bookings are not allowed. (The halt is only for Crew Change) between Prayagraj junction railway station and New Delhi
