= Madhupur–Giridih–Koderma line =

Railway route in India

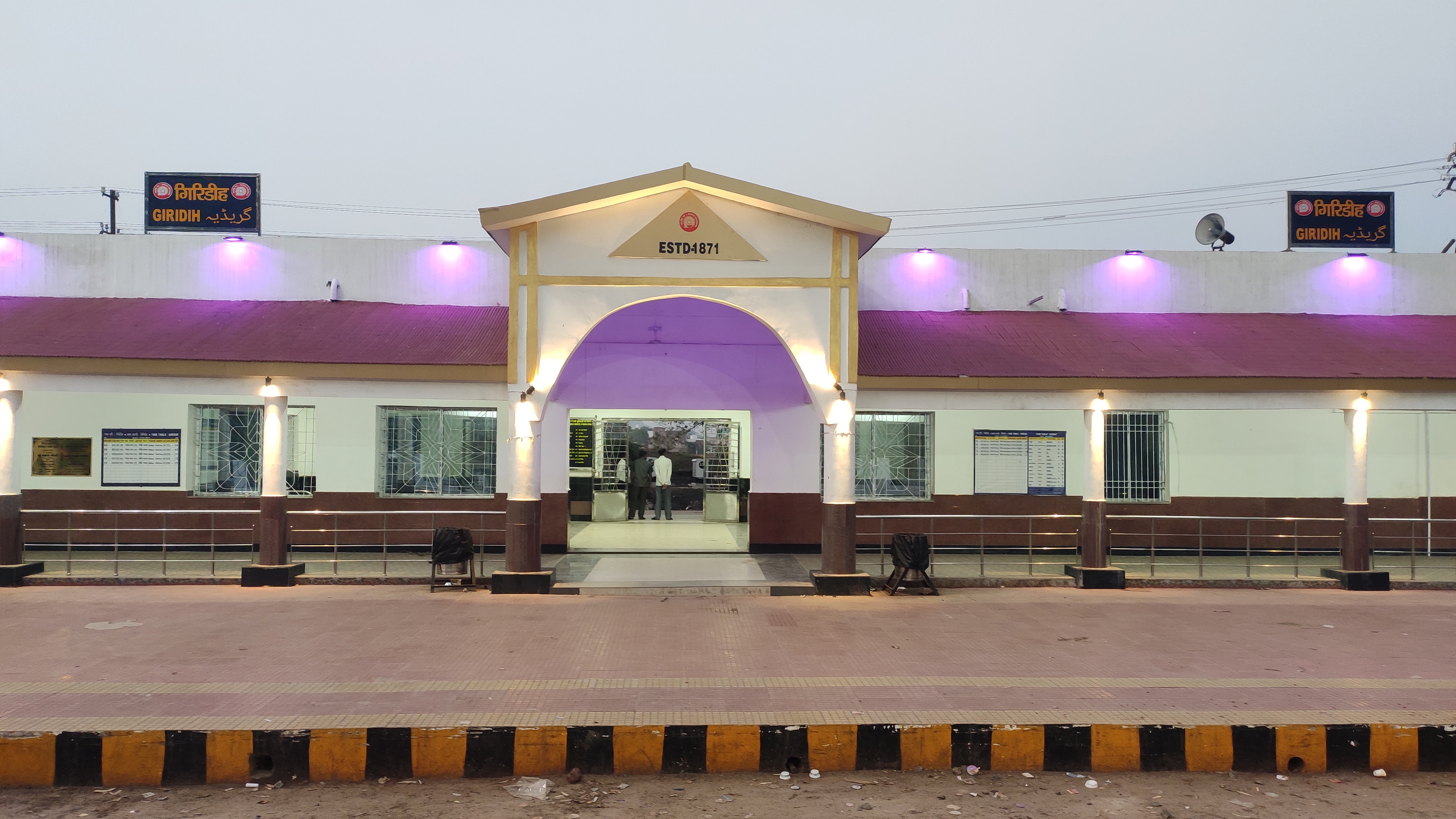
- Giridih, an important railway station on Madhupur–Giridih–Koderma line

Overview
- Status: Operational
- Owner: Indian Railways
- Locale: Jharkhand, India
- Termini: Madhupur Junction; Koderma Junction
- Stations: 21 operational

Service
- Type: Electrified
- System: Broad gauge
- Services: Koderma–Madhupur line
- Operator(s): Eastern Railway; East Central Railway

History
- Opened: 1871, 2012, 2015, 2019

Technical
- Line length: 138 km (86 mi)
- Number of tracks: 1
- Track gauge: 5 ft 6 in (1,676 mm) broad gauge
- Electrification: Yes
- Operating speed: 110 km/h

Madhupur–Giridih–Koderma line is a 138 km (86 mi)-long single 5 ft 6 in (1,676 mm) broad gauge track from Madhupur town in Deoghar district to Koderma town in Koderma district via Giridih town in Giridih district of Jharkhand state. It is an extended route of Madhupur–Giridih railway line. The Koderma–Maheshmunda section falls under Dhanbad Division of East Central Railway and Giridih–Madhupur section under Asansol Division of Eastern Railway. The construction of 110 km (68 mi) rail line from Koderma to Maheshmunda was done under supervision of Dhanbad Division of East Central Railway.

== History ==
Giridih railway station was built as a railway siding in 1871 by the British government in India (prior to the India's independence in 1947) mainly for transport of mineral reserve from the region. The contract for the railway siding was awarded in 1865 and the construction was completed in 1871. The siding is owned by Central Coalfields Limited.

A 110 km (68 mi) track from Koderma to Maheshmunda was constructed. This extended the Madhupur–Giridih railway line to Koderma, effectively making it a Madhupur–Giridih–Koderma line. A new railway station was built in Giridih named as New Giridih railway station (NGRH) which leaves out the already existing Giridih railway station (GRD) on this route, also making Maheshmunda a junction station. On 16 February 2019, Eastern Railway in its press-release announced a passenger train service w.e.f. 25 February 2019 from Koderma to Madhupur via New Giridih. Onward journey duration is of 4 hours and 5 minutes while the return journey duration is 4 hours and 25 minutes. Eastern Railway also announced another passenger train service w.e.f. 25 February 2019 from Koderma to Maheshmunda Junction through the same press-release. Onward journey duration is of 3 hours while the return journey duration is 3 hours and 10 minutes.

== Electrification ==
Madhupur–Giridih–Koderma line was completely electrified in October 2020.

== Further extension ==
There are plans from the Railway ministry to connect Parasnath with New Giridih via Madhuban, for the convenience of the Jain pilgrims visiting Shikharji. construction of which was sanctioned and the project included in the Union Budget 2018-19 at a cost of ₹902.86 Crores on a 50:50 cost sharing basis between the Government of Jharkhand and Indian Railways. The foundation stone for construction was laid in 2019. The 49-km long railway line will have two crossing stations and a couple of halts. During the financial year 2022-23, Indian Railways had allotted ₹50 Crores for the above project for early starting of the project. In a land acquisition application submitted to DLAO/Giridih by DyCE/Con/HZME office, ₹78.27 Crores were demanded for Raiyati land of 26 villages and payment for land acquisition is yet awaited for deposition of fund from Government of Jharkhand.

There are other proposals as well to connect New Giridih with Dhanbad via Tundi and Govindpur, and with Jhajha via Bengabad, Chakai and Sono. The first phase of the Jhajha–New Giridih rail line involves 20-km long Jhajha–Batia section, the foundation for which was laid in 2019 and which will be constructed at a cost of Rs 496 crore.

A final location survey for 7.54 km-long Madhupur bypass line was sanctioned in February 2020 after construction of which trains from Jasidih can run up to Giridih and Koderma without loco reversal at Madhupur. A delay of more than 30 minutes for an engine change at Madhupur will thus be avoided. The estimated cost of the linking project is Rs 281 crore.

== Description ==
Following is the list of stations that are on Madhupur–Koderma route via New Giridih.

List of stations
S.No.	Station	Station Code
1	Madhupur	MDP
2	Sugapahari TP-6/3	SGPA
3	Sugapahari Halt TP-7/11	SAPT
4	Jagadishpur	JGD
5	Krishna Ballav Sahay Halt	KBSH
6	Maheshmunda Junction	MMD
7	New Giridih	NGRH
8	Salaiya	SLIA
9	Kawar	KWAR
10	Jorasankh Halt	JASH
11	Jamua	JAUA
12	Duriyatanr Halt	DUTR
13	Rema	REMA
14	Raj Dhanwar	DNWR
15	Rakesh Bagh Halt	RHBH
16	Nawadih	NWDH
17	Nawasahi Halt	NWSI
19	Maheshpur A Cabin Halt	MHSA
20	Koderma Town	KQRT
21	Koderma Junction	KQR

== Trains ==
Single passenger train run five times a day between Madhupur Junction–Giridih. The train service on Madhupur–Giridih rail route started in 1871. The passenger trains are run by Eastern Railway zone. The trains run five times daily except Thursdays and four times on Thursday. Following are the trains arriving and departing from Giridih.

Passenger Trains
Sl.No.	TRAIN NO.	TRAIN NAME
1	53511	Madhupur–Giridih Passenger
2	53512	Giridih–Madhupur Passenger
3	53513	Madhupur–Giridih Passenger
4	53514	Giridih–Madhupur Passenger
5	53515	Madhupur–Giridih Passenger
6	53516	Giridih–Madhupur Passenger
7	53517	Madhupur–Giridih Passenger
8	53518	Giridih–Madhupur Passenger
9	53519	Madhupur–Giridih Passenger
10	53520	Giridih–Madhupur Passenger

After the construction of Koderma–Maheshmunda section in 2019, new passenger trains were started on this route which are run by East Central Railway. Following are the trains running on this route via New Giridih.

Passenger trains
Sl.No.	TRAIN NO.	TRAIN NAME
1	53365	Maheshmunda–Koderma Passenger
2	53366	Koderma–Maheshmunda Passenger
3	53369	Madhupur–Koderma Passenger
4	53370	Koderma–Madhupur Passenger

A new express train connecting New Giridih to Ranchi was announced by Koderma MP Annapurna Devi on 6 April 2023 and Indian Railways released an official notification for the same on 23 August 2023. The inaugural run of New Giridih–Ranchi Intercity Express was flagged off by Koderma MP Annapurna Devi on 12 September 2023 and regular service commenced from 13 September 2023. As of now it is the only long distance express train running on this rail line, connecting the city of Giridih with the state capital Ranchi, and also the only train running with a Vistadome coach in the state of Jharkhand.

== See also ==
- Giridih railway station
- Madhupur Junction railway station
- Koderma Junction railway station
- New Giridih railway station
