= Tirupati–Jammu Tawi Humsafar Express =

Train in India

Tirupati – Jammu Tawi Humsafar Express
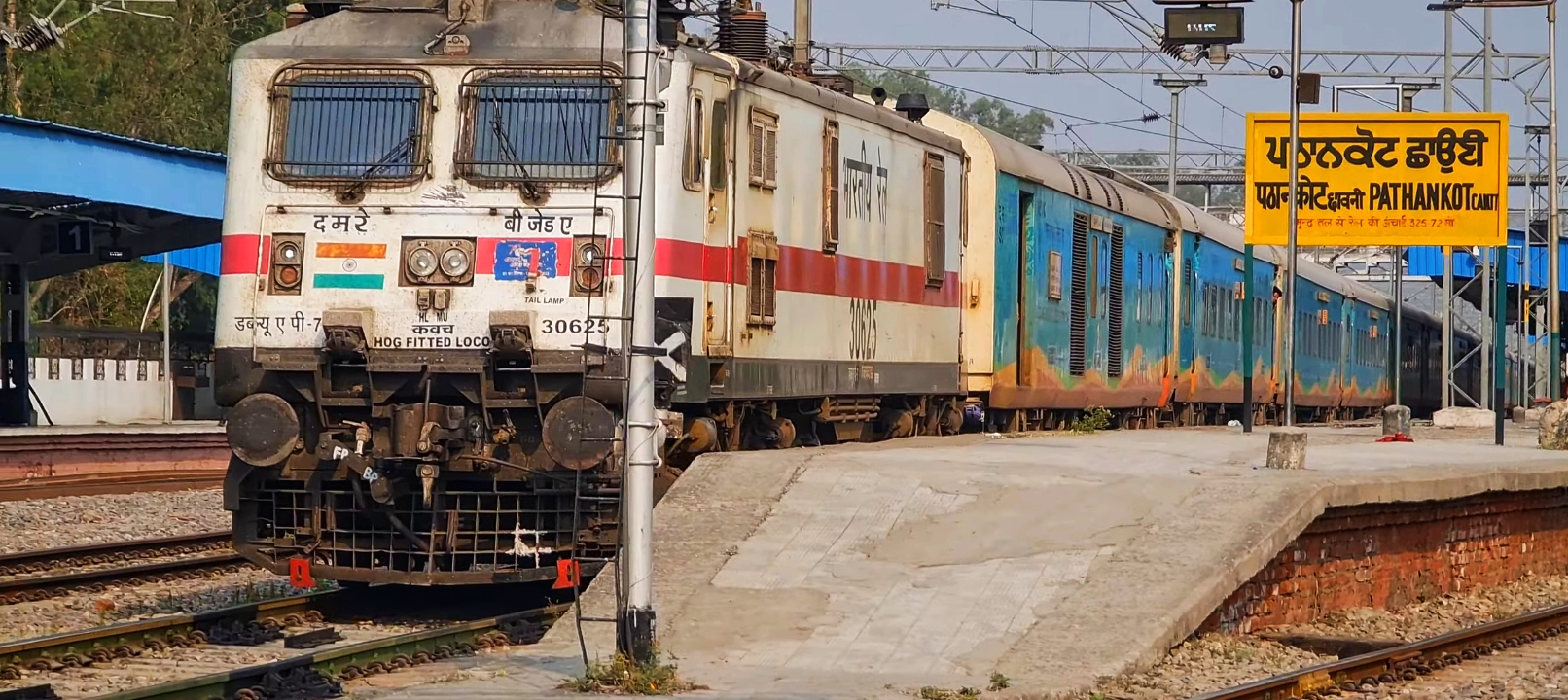
- Tirupati – Jammu Tawi Humsafar Expres At Pathankot Cantonment railway station

Overview
- Service type: Humsafar Express
- First service: 15 June 2017; 8 years ago
- Current operator: South Coast Railway

Route
- Termini: Tirupati (TPTY); Jammu Tawi (JAT)
- Stops: 12
- Distance travelled: 2,985 km (1,855 mi)
- Average journey time: 51 hours 55 minutes
- Service frequency: Weekly
- Train number: 22705 / 22706

On-board services
- Class: AC 3 tier
- Seating arrangements: No
- Sleeping arrangements: Yes
- Catering facilities: Available
- Observation facilities: Large windows
- Baggage facilities: No
- Other facilities: Below the seats

Technical
- Rolling stock: LHB Humsafar
- Track gauge: 1,676 mm (5 ft 6 in)
- Operating speed: 57 km/h (35 mph) average including halts.
Route map
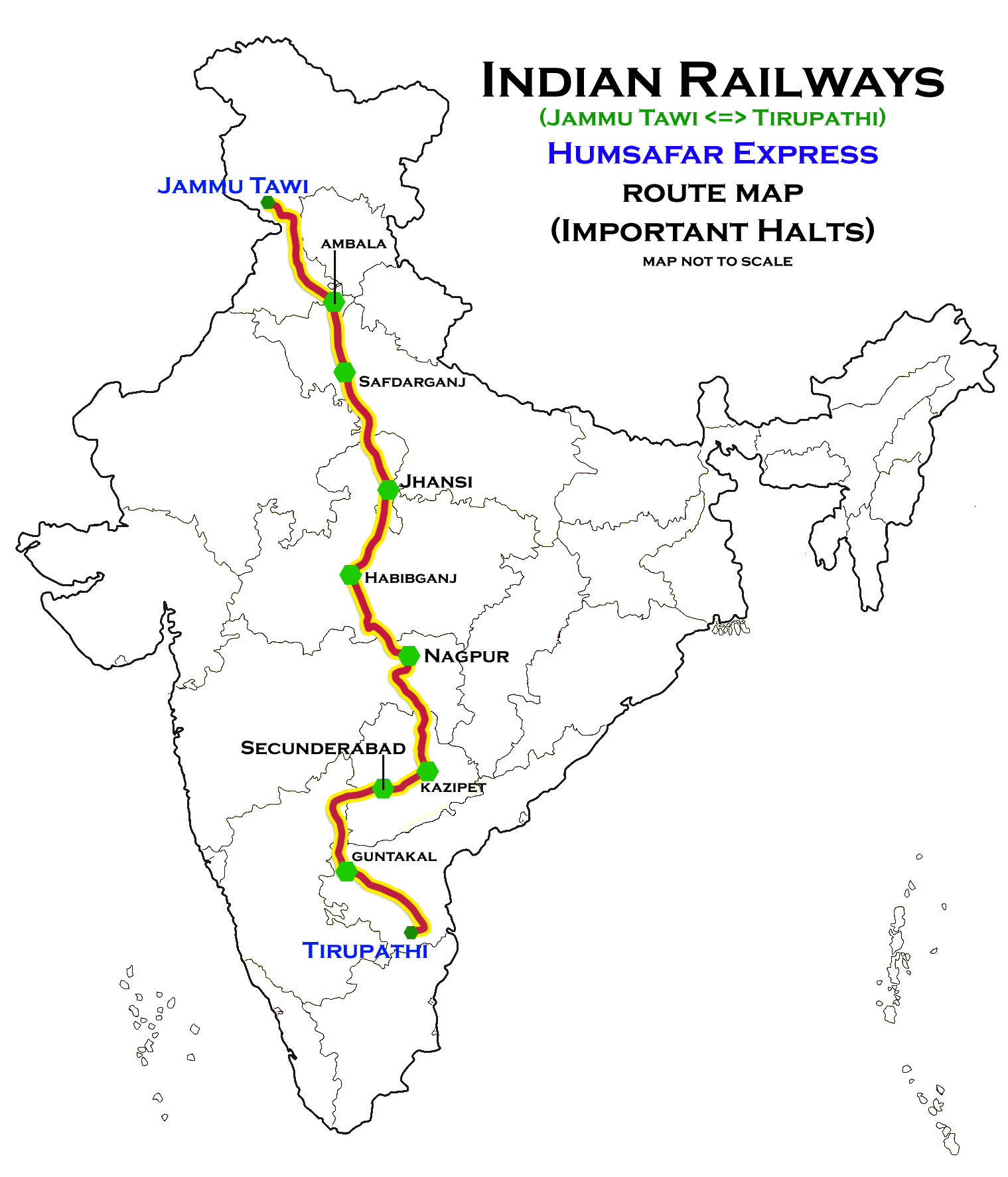

The 22705 / 22706 Tirupati–Jammu Tawi Humsafar Express is a completely 3-tier AC sleeper train of the Indian Railways connecting Tirupati in Andhra Pradesh and Jammu Tawi in Jammu and Kashmir. It is currently being operated with 22705/22706 train numbers on a weekly basis.

== Service ==
It averages 57 km/h as 22705/Tirupati–Jammu Tawi HumSafar Express starts on Tuesday and covering 2985 km in 51 hrs 50 mins & 55 km/h as 22706/Jammu Tawi–Tirupati Humsafar Express starts on Friday covering 2985 km in 53 hours 55 minutes.

== Coaches ==
The train is completely 3-tier AC LHB coach designed by Indian Railways with features of LED screen display to show information about stations and train speed. and will have announcement system as well. It also has vending machines for tea, coffee and milk, bio toilets in compartments and CCTV cameras.

=== Composition ===
This train consists of sixteen AC III tier coaches, one pantry car and two generator power car coaches.

- 13 AC III tier
- 1 pantry car
- 2 generator power car

== Route & halts ==
- Tirupati
- Guntakal Junction
- Raichur
- Secunderabad Junction
- Kazipet Junction
- Balharshah Junction
- Nagpur Junction
- Rani Kamalapati
- Jhansi Junction
- Safdarjung
- Ambala Cantonment Junction
- Jalandhar City Junction
- Jammu Tawi

== Traction ==
earlier was WAP-4 now The train is hauled by a WAP-7 electric locomotive from Lallaguda Loco Shed on its entire journey.

== See also ==
- Howrah–Tirupati Humsafar Express
- Humsafar Express
- Jammu Tawi railway station
- Tirupati railway station
