= Sogaria (Kota)–Danapur Express =

Train in India

Sogaria (Kota) - Danapur Express
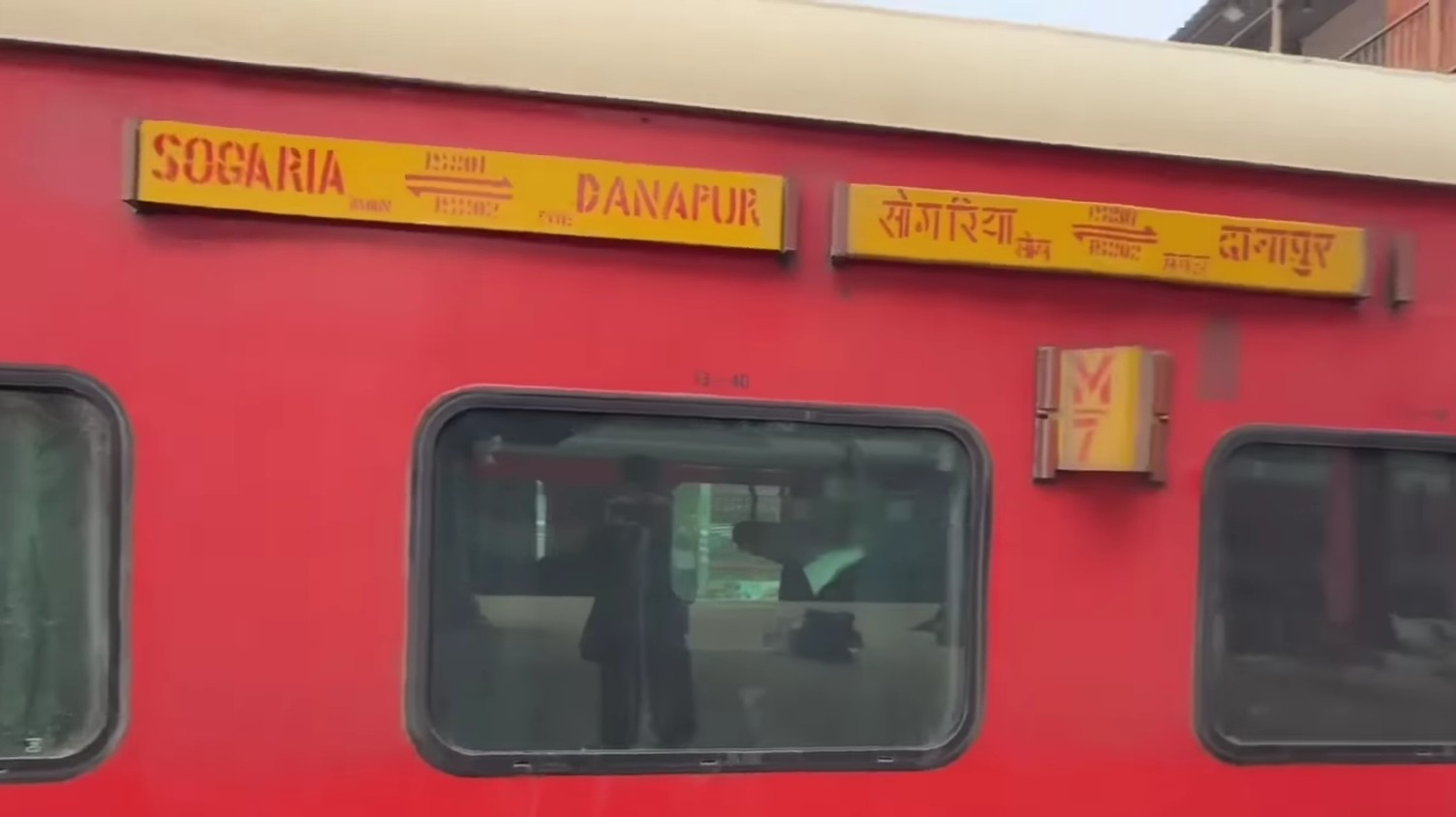

Overview
- Service type: Express
- Status: Active
- Locale: Rajasthan, Madhya Pradesh, Uttar Pradesh and Bihar
- First service: 8 December 2025; 2 months ago
- Current operator: West Central (WC)

Route
- Termini: Sogaria (SGAC); Danapur (DNR)
- Stops: 16
- Distance travelled: 1,173 km (729 mi)
- Average journey time: 21h 15m
- Service frequency: Weekly
- Train number: 19801 / 19802

On-board services
- Classes: General Unreserved, Sleeper Class, AC 2nd Class, AC 3rd Class Economy, AC 3rd Class
- Seating arrangements: Yes
- Sleeping arrangements: Yes
- Catering facilities: E Catering
- Observation facilities: Large windows
- Baggage facilities: No
- Other facilities: Below the seats

Technical
- Rolling stock: LHB coach
- Track gauge: 1,676 mm (5 ft 6 in)
- Electrification: 25 kV 50 Hz AC Overhead line
- Operating speed: 130 km/h (81 mph) maximum, 55 km/h (34 mph) average including halts.
- Track owner: Indian Railways

The 19801 / 19802 Sogaria (Kota)–Danapur Express is an Express train belonging to West Central Railway zone that runs between the city Sogaria (Kota) of Rajasthan and Danapur of Bihar in India.

It operates as train number 19801 from Sogaria (Kota) to Danapur and as train number 19802 in the reverse direction, serving the states of Bihar, Uttar Pradesh, Madhya Pradesh and Rajasthan.

== Schedule ==
• 19801/ Sogaria (Kota)–Danapur Express has an average speed of 55 km/h and covers 1676 km in 21h 15m.

• 19802/ Danapur–Sogaria (Kota) Express has an average speed of 53 km/h and covers 1676 km in 22h 15m.

== Routes and halts ==
The Important Halts of the train are :

● Sogaria (Kota)

● Baran

● Ruthiyai Junction

● Guna Junction

● Saugor

● Damoh

● Katni Murwara

● Maihar

● Satna Junction

● Manikpur Junction

● Prayagraj Chheoki Junction

● Vindhyachal

● Pt. Deen Dayal Upadhyaya Junction

● Buxar

● Ara Junction

● Danapur

== Schedule ==
• 19801 - 12:45 PM (Monday) [Sogaria (Kota)]

• 19802 - 12:45 PM (Tuesday) [Danapur]

== Coach composition ==
1. General Unreserved - 4
2. Sleeper Class - 5
3. AC 3rd Class - 2
4. AC 3rd Class Economy - 7
5. AC 2nd Class - 2

== Traction ==
As the entire route is fully electrified it is hauled by a Bhagat Ki Kothi Shed-based WAP-7 electric locomotive from Sogaria (Kota) to Danapur and vice versa.

== Rake share ==
The train has no rake Reversal or rake share.

== See also ==
Trains from Sogaria (Kota) :

No trains.

Trains from Danapur :

1. Danapur–Anand Vihar Jan Sadharan Express
2. Secunderabad–Danapur Express
3. Udhna–Danapur Express
4. Tapti Ganga Express
5. Sahibganj–Danapur Intercity Express

== Notes ==
a. Runs 1 day in a week with both directions.
