= Danapur–SMVT Bengaluru Superfast Express =

Train in India

Danapur - SMVT Bengaluru Superfast Express

Overview
- Service type: Superfast
- Status: Active
- Locale: Bihar, Uttar Pradesh, Madhya Pradesh, Maharashtra, Telangana, Andhra Pradesh, Tamil Nadu and Karnataka
- First service: 1 September 2026; 31 days ago
- Current operator: East Central Railways (ECR)

Route
- Termini: Danapur (DNR); SMVT Bengaluru (SMVB)
- Stops: 22
- Distance travelled: 2,681 km (1,666 mi)
- Average journey time: 47h 45m
- Service frequency: Daily
- Train number: 22365 / 22366

On-board services
- Classes: General Unreserved, Sleeper Class, AC 3rd Class, AC 2nd Class
- Seating arrangements: Yes
- Sleeping arrangements: Yes
- Catering facilities: On-board Catering; E-Catering
- Observation facilities: Large windows
- Baggage facilities: No
- Other facilities: Below the seats

Technical
- Rolling stock: ICF coach
- Track gauge: 1,676 mm (5 ft 6 in)
- Electrification: 25 kV 50 Hz AC overhead line
- Operating speed: 56 km/h (35 mph) average including halts
- Track owner: Indian Railways

The 22365 / 22366 Danapur–SMVT Bengaluru Superfast Express is an Superfast Express train belonging to East Central Railway zone that runs between Danapur and SMVT Bengaluru in India.

== Schedule ==
- 22365 – 2:45 PM (Daily) [Danapur]
- 22366 – 11:50 PM (Daily) [SMVT Bengaluru]

== Routes and halts ==
The important halts of the train are :

- Danapur
- Ara Junction
- Buxar
- Pt. Deen Dayal Upadhyaya Junction
- Prayagraj Chheoki Junction
- Satna Junction
- Jabalpur Junction
- Itarsi Junction
- Nagpur Junction
- Sewagram Junction
- Chandrapur
- Balharshah Junction
- Warangal
- Vijayawada Junction
- Ongole
- Gudur Junction
- Perambur
- Katpadi Junction
- Jolarpettai Junction
- Bangarapet Junction
- Whitefield
- SMVT Bengaluru

== Traction ==
As the entire route is fully electrified it is hauled by a Samastipur Loco Shed-based WAP-4 electric locomotive from Danapur to SMVT Bengaluru and vice versa.

== Rake reversal or rake share ==
No rake reversal or rake share.

== See also ==
Trains from Danapur :

1. Pune–Danapur Amrit Bharat Express
2. Danapur–Anand Vihar Jan Sadharan Express
3. Udhna–Danapur Express
4. Jogbani–Danapur Vande Bharat Express
5. Sanghamitra Superfast Express

Trains from SMVT Bengaluru :

1. SMVT Bengaluru–Alipurduar Amrit Bharat Express
2. SMVT Bengaluru–Murdeshwar Express
3. Anga Express
4. New Tinsukia–SMVT Bengaluru Superfast Express
5. SMVT Bengaluru–Radhikapur Express

== Notes ==
a. Runs daily in a week with both directions.
