= 2024 Tamil Nadu train collision =

Railway accident in West Bengal, India

Tamil Nadu train collision
- Crash location on a map of India

Details
- Date: 11 October 2024 around 20:30 IST
- Location: Near Kavaraipettai railway station, Tiruvallur district, Tamil Nadu
- Coordinates: 13.3629°N 80.1486°E
- Country: India
- Line: Gudur–Chennai section
- Operator: Indian Railways
- Owner: Government of India
- Incident type: Rear-End Collision, derailment
- Cause: Under investigation maybe sabotage of nuts and bolts removed on 51B points close to loop line

Statistics
- Trains: 2 trains: A goods train; Bagmati Express (Train No. 12577) between Darbhanga Jn. and Mysore Jn.
- Vehicles: WAP-7 locomotive
- Injured: 19+

On 11 October 2024, two trains collided near Chennai in the Indian state of Tamil Nadu. Bagmati Express, a passenger train, collided with a stationary goods train near Kavaraipettai railway station in Tiruvallur district. The accident resulted in the derailment of 13 coaches of the Bagmati Express in which at least 19 people were injured.

== Crash ==
On 11 October 2024, Bagmati Express, (Train No. 12577), a passenger train with WAP-7 was traveling from Darbhanga in Bihar to Mysore in Karnataka. The train was traveling near Kavaraipettai railway station on the Gudur–Chennai section of the Howrah-Chennai main line in Tiruvallur district, Tamil Nadu at 20:30 IST. The train rammed onto a goods train, which was stationary on an adjacent loop line. The collision resulted in the derailment of 13 coaches of the Bagmati Express, some of which caught fire. Two wagons of the goods train were also damaged. At least 19 people were injured including four people who were seriously injured in the accident.

== Aftermath ==
The injured were treated at the Stanley Medical College Hospital in Chennai. The Indian Railways cancelled two trains and diverted multiple trains. The other passengers in the train were transported to Ponneri by buses and later to Chennai Central through Electric Multiple Units of Indian Railways. A special train carried them towards the original destination on 12 October. The tracks were cleared by 14 October and traffic was restored at 9:15 IST.

== Causes ==
The train crew indicated that the train switched tracks after automatically after a sudden jolt. The Indian Railways constituted a high level committee for inquiry into the accident and the Government of India ordered the National Investigation Agency to investigate if the accident was caused due to sabotage. The Commissioner of Railway Safety began the investigation on 12 October. The General Manager of Southern Railway zone said that the train had no scheduled halt in the region and was given green signal to proceed. He also stated that the driver followed the signals and the train should have taken the main line rather than the loop line.

A spokesperson of Southern Railway said that there were no casualties due to the safety features of the LHB coaches used on the train. These coaches were designed to withstand higher impact and the coupling mechanism prevented coaches from climbing on top of each other on impact. He also said that the locomotive of the passenger train impacted the brake van of the goods train, which absorbed most of the impact.

In July 2025, Commission of Railway Safety reported that it found 'sabotage' as the cause of derailment.

== See also ==
- List of rail accidents (2020–present)
- List of railway accidents and incidents in India
- 2023 Odisha train collision
- 2024 West Bengal train collision
