= Bengaluru Cantonment railway station =

Railway station in Karnataka, India

Bengaluru Cantonment Beṅgaḷūru Daṇḍu
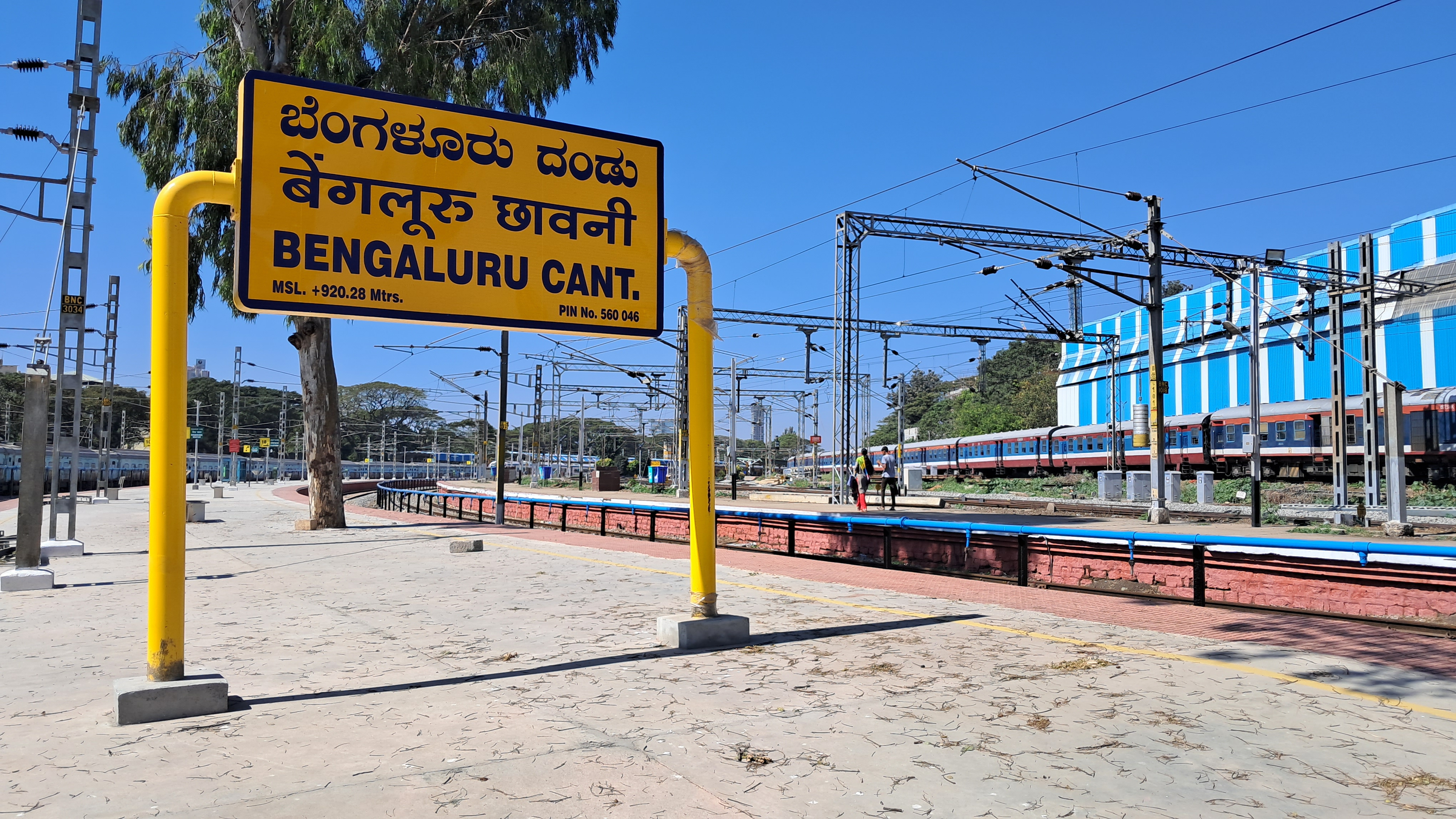
- Station Board with the DEMU Maintenance Yard

General information
- Other names: Bengaluru Cant.
- Location: Station Road, Vasanth Nagar, Bengaluru-560052, Karnataka; India
- Coordinates: 12.99°N 77.59°E
- Elevation: 929 m (3,048 ft)
- System: Indian Railways station
- Owner: Indian Railways
- Line: Chennai Central-Bengaluru line
- Platforms: 7 (1, 1A, 1B, 1C, 1D, 2 (3 is for DEMU only))
- Connections: Pink Line Cantonment Railway Station (in future); Bus, Taxi

Construction
- Structure type: At grade
- Parking: Yes

Other information
- Status: Active
- Station code: BNC
- Zone(s): South Western

Services
Preceding station	Indian Railways	Following station
Bangalore City Terminus	Chennai Central–Bangalore City line Chennai–Bangalore Express section	Krishnarajapuram towards Yelahanka Junction, Jolarpettai Junction or Chennai Central
Bangalore City Terminus	Chennai Central–Bangalore City line Jolarpettai–Bangalore DEMU/MEMU section	Baiyyappanahalli towards Yelahanka Junction or Jolarpettai Junction
Vande Bharat Express routes
Terminus	Salem Junction–Bangalore City line 20641 / 20642	Hosur towards Coimbatore Junction
Terminus	Chennai Central–Bangalore City line 20671 / 20672	Krishnarajapuram towards Madurai Junction via Tiruchchirappalli Junction
- Computerized ticketing counters Luggage checking system Parking Disabled access Food plaza Kiosks WC Taxi stand Public transportation
Location
- Location within Karnataka

Bengaluru Cantonment railway station, also known as Bengaluru Cant (station code: BNC) is one of the four important railway stations serving the city of Bengaluru and it is located in the locality of Vasanth Nagar and adjoins Fraser Town, Benson Town and Shivajinagar. The Station started operations in 1864, with the launch of the Bengaluru Cantonment – Jolarpettai train services by the Madras Railway. The train line was broad-gauge and 149 km long, connecting the Bengaluru Cantonment with Vellore district. A total of 119 passenger trains start/end/pass through Bengaluru Cantonment railway station. Total 499 stations are directly connected to Bengaluru Cantonment railway station via these 269 passenger trains.

== Facilities ==
Amenities available at the station include Passenger Reservation Centre (PRS), Waiting halls, AC VIP lounge, enquiry counters, essential stalls, Food plaza, ATM along with the other basic facilities. Hand trolley facility are provided to porters for carrying luggage of passengers with no change in fare charged by the porters.

Considering the need of medical services at the station by Bengaluru Division of the South Western Railway opened a clinic in February, 2014 which would provide free emergency medical services for the train travellers.

In the future, the Namma Metro's Pink Line will connect the Cantonment Railway station between Kalena Agrahara and Nagawara. A skywalk is proposed to connect the metro station with the railway station.

=== Station Layout ===
This station consists of 7 platforms and 8 tracks which are connected by foot overbridge for passengers to board the express trains at the respective platforms. These platforms are built to accumulate 24-coach express trains.

G	North Entrance Street level	Exit/Entrance & ticket counter
P	Platform 3	Towards → Kolar; Next Station: Bengaluru East
P	FOB, Island platform | P2 & P3 Doors will open on the right | P2 & P3 – Express & DEMU Lines
P	Platform 2	Towards → Jolarpettai Junction / MGR Chennai Central; Next Station: Krishnarajapuram
P	Platform 1	Towards ← KSR Bengaluru / Mysore Junction
P	FOB, Island platform | P1 & P-1A Doors will open on the left | P1 & P-1A – Express Lines
P	Platform 1A	Towards → Baiyyappanahalli; Next Station: Bengaluru East
P	Platform 1B	Towards → Baiyyappanahalli; Next Station: Hosur / Krishnarajapuram
P	Island platform | P-1B Doors will open on the right | P-1C Doors will open on the left Platforms 1B and 1C are dedicated for Vande Bharat Express trains and also for MEMU trains
P	Platform 1C	Towards → Baiyyappanahalli; Next Station: Hosur / Krishnarajapuram
P	Platform 1D	Towards → Baiyyappanahalli; Next Station: Bengaluru East
P	Island platform | P-1D doors will open on the right | P-1E Not in Operation
P	Platform 1E	Side Line (Not in Operation)
G	South Entrance Street level	Exit/Entrance & ticket counter

== Expansion ==
Bengaluru Cantonment station got a face lift with the remodelled entrance and ticketing counter behind the platform 2 which was opened to public in January 2011 by K Muniyappa, Union minister of state for railways.

== Trains ==
Chennai–Bangalore Double Decker Express has a stop at Bengaluru Cantonment railway station. Following is the table of list of trains passing through Bangalore Cantonment station every day. earlier Hatia Bangalore Cantonment express & Bhubaneswar Bangalore Cantonment express used to operate from here, later the terminal has been changed from Cantonment railway station to Sir M Visveswaraya Terminal, Bangalore.

Trains at Bangalore Cantonment railway station
Train no.	Train name	Train type	Source	Destination
20642	Vande Bharat Express	Express	Bangalore Cantonment (BNC)	Coimbatore Junction (CBE)
20672	Vande Bharat Express	Express	Bangalore Cantonment (BNC)	Madurai Junction (MDU)
12578	Bagmati Express	Express	Mysore Junction (MYS)	Darbhanga Junction (DBG)
12577	Bagmati Express	Express	Darbhanga Junction (DBG)	Mysore Junction (MYS)
06347	Bangalore Express	Express	Ernakulam Junction (ERS)	Bangalore City (SBC)
06506	Bangalore Express	Express	Hindupur (HUP)	Bangalore City (SBC)
16525	Bangalore Express	Express	Kanyakumari (CAPE)	Bangalore City (SBC)
12785	Ashokapuram Express	Express	Kacheguda (KCG)	Ashokapuram (AP)
06235	Bangalore Express	Express	Mysore Junction (MYS)	Chennai Central (MAS)
06234	Bangalore Express	Express	Rameswaram (RMM)	Mysore Junction (MYS)
16322	Bangalore Express	Express	Trivandrum Central (TVC)	Bangalore City (SBC)
76508	BWT-BNC DEMU Express	Express	Bangarapet Junction (BWT)	Bangalore City (SBC)

== See also ==
- Bangalore East railway station
- Bangalore City railway station
- Yeshvantapur railway station
