= Patliputra–Sir M. Visvesvaraya Terminal Superfast Express =

Indian superfast train

Patliputra – SMVT Bengaluru Weekly Superfast Express

Overview
- Service type: Superfast
- First service: 8 November 2013; 12 years ago
- Current operator: East Central Railway zone

Route
- Termini: Patliputra Junction (PPTA); Sir M. Visvesvaraya Terminal (SMVB)
- Stops: 28
- Distance travelled: 2,711 km (1,685 mi)
- Average journey time: 48h 40m
- Service frequency: Weekly
- Train number: 22351/22352

On-board services
- Classes: AC 1st Class, AC 2 Tier, AC 3 Tier, AC 3 Tier Economy, Sleeper class, General Unreserved
- Seating arrangements: No
- Sleeping arrangements: Yes
- Catering facilities: E-catering
- Observation facilities: LHB coach
- Entertainment facilities: No
- Baggage facilities: No
- Other facilities: Below the seats

Technical
- Rolling stock: 2
- Track gauge: 1,676 mm (5 ft 6 in)
- Operating speed: 56 km/h (35 mph), including halts
Route map
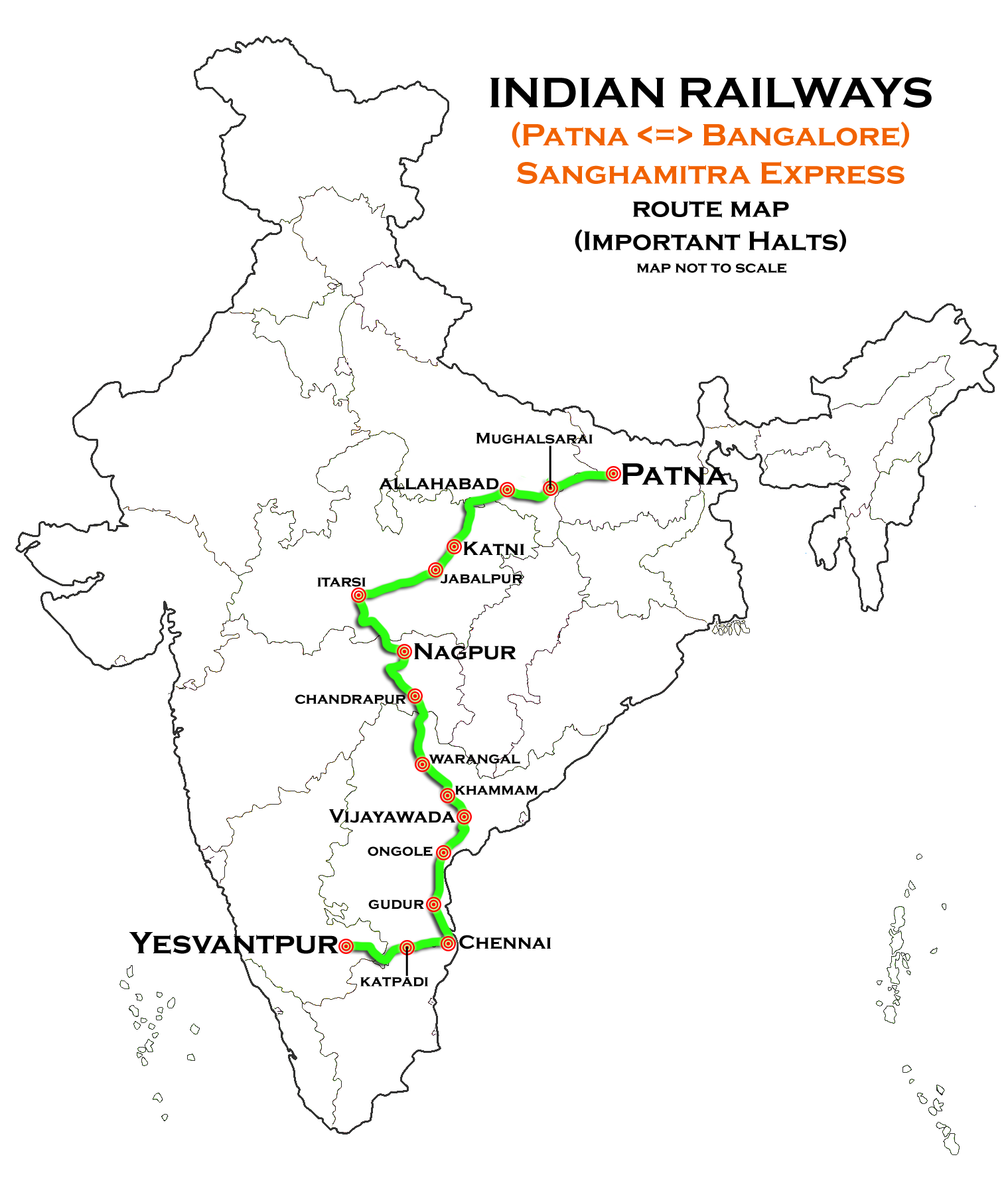

The Patliputra–SMVT Bengaluru Weekly Superfast Express is a Superfast train belonging to East Central Railway zone that runs between Patliputra Junction in Patna, Bihar and Sir M. Visvesvaraya Terminal, Bengaluru in Bangalore, Karnataka. It is currently being operated with 22351/22352 train numbers on a weekly basis. It runs with LHB coach with effect from 27 December 2019.

== Service ==
The 22351/Patliputra–SMVT Bengaluru Weekly Express has an average speed of 56 km/h and covers 2711 km in 48h 40m. The 22352/SMVT Bengaluru–Patliputra Weekly Express has an average speed of 56 km/h and covers 2711 km in 48h 40m.

== Route and halts ==
The important halts of the train are:

- Patliputra Junction
- Danapur
- Pt. Deen Dayal Upadhyaya Junction (Mughal Sarai)
- Prayagraj Chheoki Junction
- Satna Junction
- Katni Junction
- Jabalpur Junction
- Itarsi Junction
- Nagpur Junction
- Balharshah Junction
- khammam
- Vijayawada Junction
- Ongole
- Gudur Junction
- Chennai Central
- Arakkonam Junction
- Krishnarajapuram
- Sir M. Visvesvaraya Terminal, Bengaluru

== Coach composition ==
The train has highly refurbished LHB coach with a maximum speed of 110 km/h. The train consists of 22 coaches:

- 1 AC First Class
- 2 AC II Tier
- 6 AC III Tier
- 1 AC III Tier Economy
- 6 Sleeper coaches
- 1 Pantry Car
- 3 General Unreserved
- 2 End-on Generator

== Traction ==
Both trains are hauled by an Itarsi Loco Shed-based WDP-4D diesel locomotive from Patna to Itarsi. From Itarsi the train is hauled by an Itarsi Loco Shed-based WAP-4 electric locomotive until Chennai. From Chennai the train is hauled by an Itarsi Loco Shed-based WAP-4 electric locomotive until Yesvantpur, and vice versa.

== Direction reversal ==
The train reverses its direction once:

- Chennai Central

== Schedule ==
Train number	Station code	Departure station	Departure time	Departure day	Arrival station	Arrival time	Arrival day
22351	PPTA	Patliputra (Patna)	20:15	Friday	(Bangalore)	17:30	Sunday
22352	YPR	Sir Mokshagundam Vishveshwaraya Terminal (Bangalore)	13:30	Monday	Patliputra (Patna)	10:25	Wednesday

== See also ==
- Patliputra Junction railway station
- Yesvantpur Junction railway station
- Sanghamithra Express
