= Sahibganj–Danapur Intercity Express =

Sahibganj - Danapur Intercity Express
Overview
- Service type: Express
- Current operator: East Central Railway zone

Route
- Termini: Sahebganj; Danapur
- Stops: 29
- Distance travelled: 305 km (190 mi)
- Average journey time: 8 hours 55 mins
- Service frequency: Except Sunday
- Train number: 13235 / 13236

On-board services
- Classes: AC Chair Car -1 coach and Second Seating (2S) - 20 Coaches
- Seating arrangements: Yes
- Sleeping arrangements: Yes
- Catering facilities: No onboard catering but E-catering available
- Observation facilities: Rake Sharing with 13233 / 13234 Rajgriha Express

Technical
- Rolling stock: Standard Indian Railways ICF Coaches
- Track gauge: 1,676 mm (5 ft 6 in)
- Electrification: Electrified Runs with DDU/WAP 4
- Operating speed: 35.5 km/h (22 mph)

The 13235 / 36 Sahibganj - Danapur Intercity Express is an Express train belonging to Indian Railways East Central Railway zone that runs between Sahibganj Junction railway station and Danapur in India.

It operates as train number 13235 from Sahebganj to Danapur and as train number 13236 in the reverse direction serving the states of Jharkhand & Bihar.

== Coaches ==
The 13235 / 36 Sahibganj - Danapur Intercity Express has one AC chair car, twenty general unreserved & two SLR (seating with luggage rake) coaches. It does not carry a pantry car coach.

As is customary with most train services in India, coach composition may be amended at the discretion of Indian Railways depending on demand.

== Service ==
The 13235 Sahebganj - Danapur Intercity Express covers the distance of 305 km (190 mi) in 9 hours 10 mins (33 km/h) and in 8 hours 00 mins as the 13236 Danapur - Sahebganj Intercity Express (38 km/h).

As the average speed of the train is lower than 55 km/h (34 mph), as per railway rules, its fare doesn't includes a Superfast surcharge.

== Routing ==
The 13235 / 36 Sahibganj - Danapur Intercity Express runs from Sahebganj via Bhagalpur Junction, Jamalpur Junction, Kiul Junction to Danapur.

== Traction ==
As the route was electrified in May 2019, a Mughalsarai Junction based WAP-4 diesel locomotive pulls the train to its destination.
