= Phulwari Sharif railway station =

Railway station in Patna, Bihar, India

PHULWARI SHARIF
- Indian Railways logo

General information
- Location: Phulwari Sharif, Patna, Bihar-801505; India
- Coordinates: 25.5866°N 85.0803°E
- Elevation: 58 metres (190 ft)
- System: Indian Railways station
- Owner: Indian Railways
- Operator: East Central Railway
- Lines: Howrah–Delhi main line Patna–Sonepur–Hajipur section
- Platforms: 3
- Tracks: 5 1,676 mm (5 ft 6 in)

Construction
- Structure type: Standard (on-ground station)
- Parking: Available

Other information
- Status: Active
- Station code: PWS
- Zone(s): East Central Railway
- Division(s): Danapur

History
- Former names: East Indian Railways

Services
East Central Railway
Preceding station	Indian Railways	Following station
Patliputra Junction towards ?	Sonepur–Patna Towards Ganga Rail–Road Bridge (Sonepur)	Sachivalaya Halt towards ?
Danapur towards ?	Patna–Mughalsarai section Towards Patna JN.	Sachivalaya Halt towards ?
Location
- Location within India Location within Bihar Location within Patna
- Interactive map of Phulwari Sharif

Phulwari Sharif Railway Station (station code: PWS), is a railway station serving the locality of Phulwari Sharif in the Patna district, of the Indian state of Bihar. The Phulwari Sharif railway station, is well connected to most of the major cities in India by the railway network, which lies in between Howrah–Delhi main line which serves it with numerous trains. Phulwari Sharif is well connected to Patna, Delhi, Mumbai, Kolkata, Varanasi, Kanpur, Guwahati and other cities.

== Facilities ==
The major facilities available are Waiting rooms, retiring room, computerized reservation facility, Reservation Counter, Vehicle parking etc. The vehicles are allowed to enter the station premises. There are refreshment rooms vegetarian and non vegetarian, tea stall, book stall, post and telegraphic office and Government Railway police(G.R.P) office. Automatic ticket vending machines have been installed to reduce the queue for train tickets on the station.

=== Platforms ===
There are three platforms at Phulwari Sharif railway station. The platforms are interconnected with three pedestrian footbridges.
