= Kavaraipettai railway station =

Railway Junction in Tiruvallur, India

General information
- Location: Kavaraipettai, Tamil Nadu
- Coordinates: 13.3629°N 80.1486°E
- Elevation: 16 metres (52 ft)
- System: rail station
- Owner: Indian Railways
- Operator: Southern Railway zone
- Line: Chennai–Gudur
- Platforms: 3 side platforms

Construction
- Parking: Available
- Accessible: Yes

Other information
- Status: Functional
- Station code: KVP
- Zone(s): Southern Railway zone
- Division(s): Chennai
Location
- Location within Tamil Nadu
- Interactive map

Kavaraipettai railway station (station code: KVP) is a railway station located in Tiruvallur district in the Indian state of Tamil Nadu. It is located on the Gudur–Chennai section of the Howrah-Chennai main line and comes under the jurisdiction of Chennai railway division of Southern Railway zone. It is classified as a SG-3 station (annual revenue less than 100 million rupees and less than 10 million passengers handled).
