= MGR Chennai Central–Shivamogga Town Superfast Express =

Train in India

Overview
- Service type: Superfast
- Locale: Tamil Nadu & Karnataka
- Current operator: Southern Railway

Route
- Termini: MGR Chennai Central (MAS); Shivamogga Town (SMET)
- Stops: 14
- Distance travelled: 631 km (392 mi)
- Average journey time: 12 hrs 50 mins
- Service frequency: Weekly
- Train number: 12691 / 12692

On-board services
- Classes: AC First, AC 2 Tier, AC 3 Tier, Sleeper Class, General Unreserved
- Seating arrangements: Yes
- Sleeping arrangements: Yes
- Catering facilities: Available
- Observation facilities: Large windows
- Baggage facilities: No
- Other facilities: Below the seats

Technical
- Rolling stock: LHB coach
- Track gauge: Broad Gauge
- Operating speed: 50 km/h (31 mph) average including halts

The 12691 / 12692 MGR Chennai Central–Shivamogga Town Superfast Express is an Express train belonging to Indian Railways Southern Railway zone that runs between MGR Chennai Central and Shivamogga Town in India.

It operates as train number 12691 from MGR Chennai Central to Shivamogga Town and as train number 12692 in the reverse direction, serving the states of Tamil Nadu & Karnataka .

== Service ==
12691 MGR Chennai Central–Shivamogga Town Superfast Express covers the distance of 631 km (392 mi) in 12 hours 50 mins (50 km/h) and in 12 hours 50 mins as the 12692 Shivamogga Town–MGR Chennai Central Superfast Express (49 km/h).

The average speed of the train is 55 km/h (34 mph).

== Route & halts ==
The 12691 / 12692 MGR Chennai Central–Shivamogga Town Superfast Express runs from MGR Chennai Central via Arakkonam Junction, Sholinghur, Katpadi Junction, Jolarpettai Junction, Bangarapet Junction, Krishnarajapuram, SMVT Bengaluru, Tumkuru, Arsikere, Birur to Shivamogga Town .

== Coach composition ==
The train has standard LHB rakes with a maximum speed of 130 km/h.

- 1 AC First Class
- 3 AC II Tier
- 3 AC III Tier
- 11 Sleeper coaches
- 2 General
- 1 PC Pantry car
- 2 End On Generator van

Loco	1	2	3	4	5	6	7	8	9	10	11	12	13	14	15	16	17	18	19	20	21	22	23
	EOG	GEN	H1	A1	A2	A3	B1	B2	S1	S2	S3	PC	S4	S5	S6	S7	S8	S9	S10	S11	GEN	EOG	MT

== Traction ==
As the route is electrified, a Royapuram Loco Shed or Krishnarajapuram Loco Shed-based WAP-7 electric locomotive pulls the train to its destination.

== Rake sharing ==
The train shares its rake with 12669/12670 Ganga Kaveri Express.
