= Sanghamitra Superfast Express =

Train in India

Overview
- Service type: Superfast Express
- Locale: Karnataka, Tamil Nadu, Andhra Pradesh, Telangana, Maharashtra, Madhya Pradesh, Uttar Pradesh & Bihar
- First service: 1 July 1988; 38 years ago
- Current operator: South Western Railway

Route
- Termini: SMVT Bengaluru (SMVB); Danapur (DNR)
- Stops: 33
- Distance travelled: 2,681 km (1,666 mi)
- Average journey time: 46 hours 25 minutes
- Service frequency: Daily
- Train number: 12295 / 12296

On-board services
- Classes: AC First Class, AC 2 Tier, AC 3 Tier, Sleeper Class, General Unreserved.
- Seating arrangements: Yes
- Sleeping arrangements: Yes
- Catering facilities: Available
- Observation facilities: Large windows
- Baggage facilities: Available
- Other facilities: Below the seats

Technical
- Rolling stock: LHB coach
- Track gauge: 1,676 mm (5 ft 6 in); Broad Gauge
- Operating speed: 58 km/h (36 mph) average including halts.
Route map
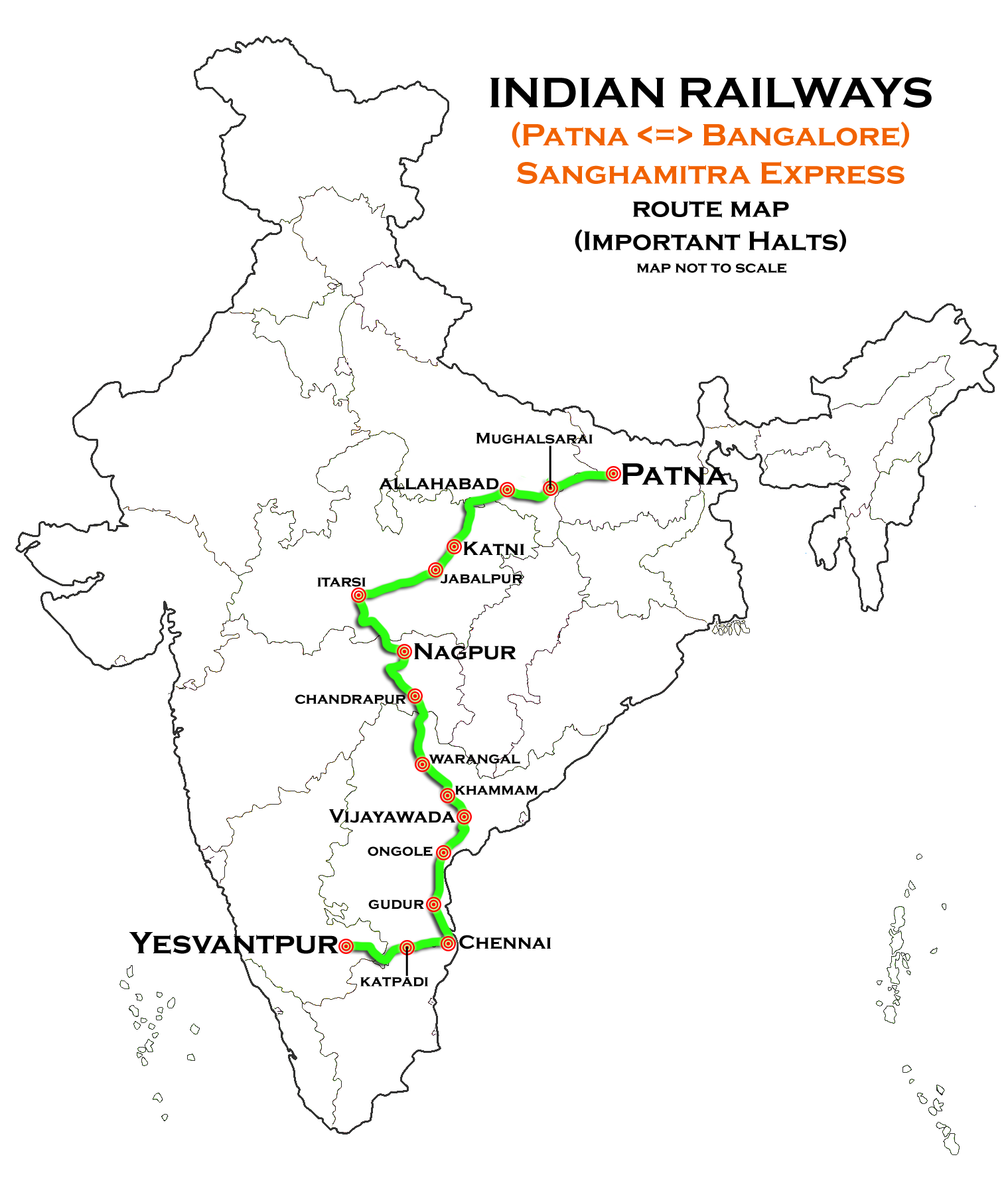

The 12295 / 12296 Sanghamitra Superfast Express is a Superfast Express train that runs daily between the Sir M. Visvesvaraya Terminal in Bengaluru, Karnataka and Danapur railway station in Patna, Bihar.

This is the one and only daily train from Patna which connects Patna with Chennai and Bengaluru. It initially ran between Chennai Central to Patna, but in 2001 it was extended to Yeswanthpur in Karnataka and ran between Yeswantpur to Patna via Chennai Central.

It marks as the longest-running daily train of the South Western Railway Division. This train takes a total of 43 hours and 45 minutes to cover the 2681 km distance. Trains numbered 12295UP and 12296DN belong to the Superfast category of Indian Railways.

In April 2024, railways started monitoring reserved compartments to prevent unauthorised occupancy. A stop at Bayappanahalli was proposed in 2018.

== Relevance ==
This train was named in honour of Sanghamitra, the daughter of Emperor Ashoka, ruler of Patliputra, the present city of Patna, and the Mauryan Empire. This train is the longest daily superfast train of South Western Railway zone.

== History ==
This train used to run from Chennai Central every Tuesday and Thursday at 13:30. Then, in early 2001, the train's route was extended to the Yesvantpur Junction departing at 7:00 on Tuesdays and Thursdays and running under the codes 6595/6596.

By 2013, the Patliputra–Yesvantpur Superfast Express route was created and ran on Fridays. It departed from Pataliputra and went to Yeswanthpur. This train, however, ran daily between the Krantivira Sangolli Rayanna Bengaluru City and Patna.

== Traction ==
Earlier it was hauled by WDP-4B, since The route is fully electrified, it is hauled by a Royapuram Loco Shed / Krishnarajapuram Loco Shed / Gomoh Loco Shed based WAP-7 and WAP-4 electric locomotive from SMVT Bangaluru to Danapur.

== Timings ==
- This train leaves SMVT Bengaluru daily at 9:20 AM, reaching Danapur at 7:40 AM on the third day.
- The train leaves Danapur daily at 20:15 to reach SMVT Bengaluru at 16:00 on the third day.

== Route and halts ==
- SMVT Bangaluru
- Krishnarajapuram
- Bangarapet Junction
- Jolarpettai Junction
- Katpadi Junction
- Arakkonam Junction
- Perambur
- Gudur Junction
- Nellore
- Ongole
- Vijayawada Junction
- khammam
- Warangal
- Ramagundam
- Balharshah Junction
- Sewagram Junction
- Nagpur Junction
- Itarsi Junction
- Jabalpur Junction
- Katni Junction
- Satna Junction
- Prayagraj Chheoki Junction
- Mirzapur
- Pt. Deen Dayal Upadhyaya Junction
- Buxar
- Ara Junction
- Danapur

== Coach composition ==
The train has 1 AC First Cum AC Two Tier, 2 AC 2-Tier, 6 AC 3-Tier, 7 Sleeper class, 3 Second class, 2 Head-on Generator cars, 1 Pantry car and a HCP (High Capacity Parcel Van) (total of 23 LHB coach).

Loco	1	2	3	4	5	6	7	8	9	10	11	12	13	14	15	16	17	18	19	20	21	22	23
	HOG	SLR	GS	GS	S1	S2	S3	S4	S5	S6	S7	PC	B1	B2	B3	B4	B5	B6	A1	A2	HA1	GS	EOG

== See also ==
- Ganga Kaveri Express
- Secunderabad–Danapur Express
- Udhna–Danapur Express
- Akal Takth Express
