= Ganga Kaveri Express =

Train in India

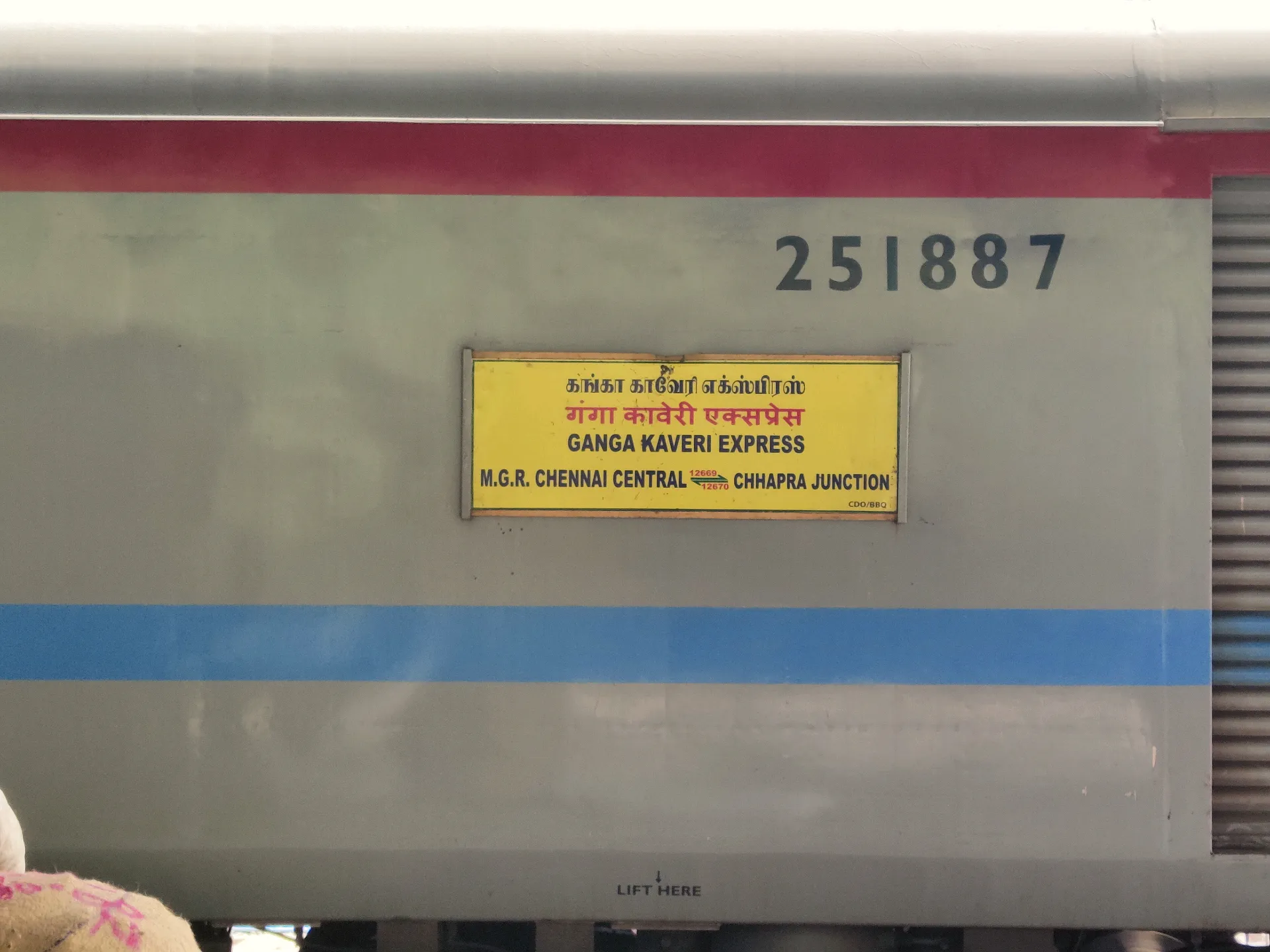
- Ganga Kaveri Express train board

Overview
- Service type: Express
- Locale: Tamil Nadu, Andhra Pradesh, Telangana, Maharashtra, Madhya Pradesh, Uttar Pradesh & Bihar
- First service: 16 February 1977; 49 years ago
- Current operator: Southern Railway

Route
- Termini: MGR Chennai Central (MAS); Chhapra Junction (CPR)
- Stops: 22
- Distance travelled: 2,343 km (1,456 mi)
- Average journey time: 40 hrs
- Service frequency: Bi-weekly
- Train number: 12669 / 12670

On-board services
- Classes: AC First Class, AC 2 Tier, AC 3 Tier, Sleeper Class, General Unreserved.
- Seating arrangements: Yes
- Sleeping arrangements: Yes
- Catering facilities: Available
- Observation facilities: Large windows
- Baggage facilities: Available
- Other facilities: Below the seats

Technical
- Rolling stock: LHB coach
- Track gauge: 1,676 mm (5 ft 6 in)
- Operating speed: 55 km/h (34 mph) average including halts.
Route map
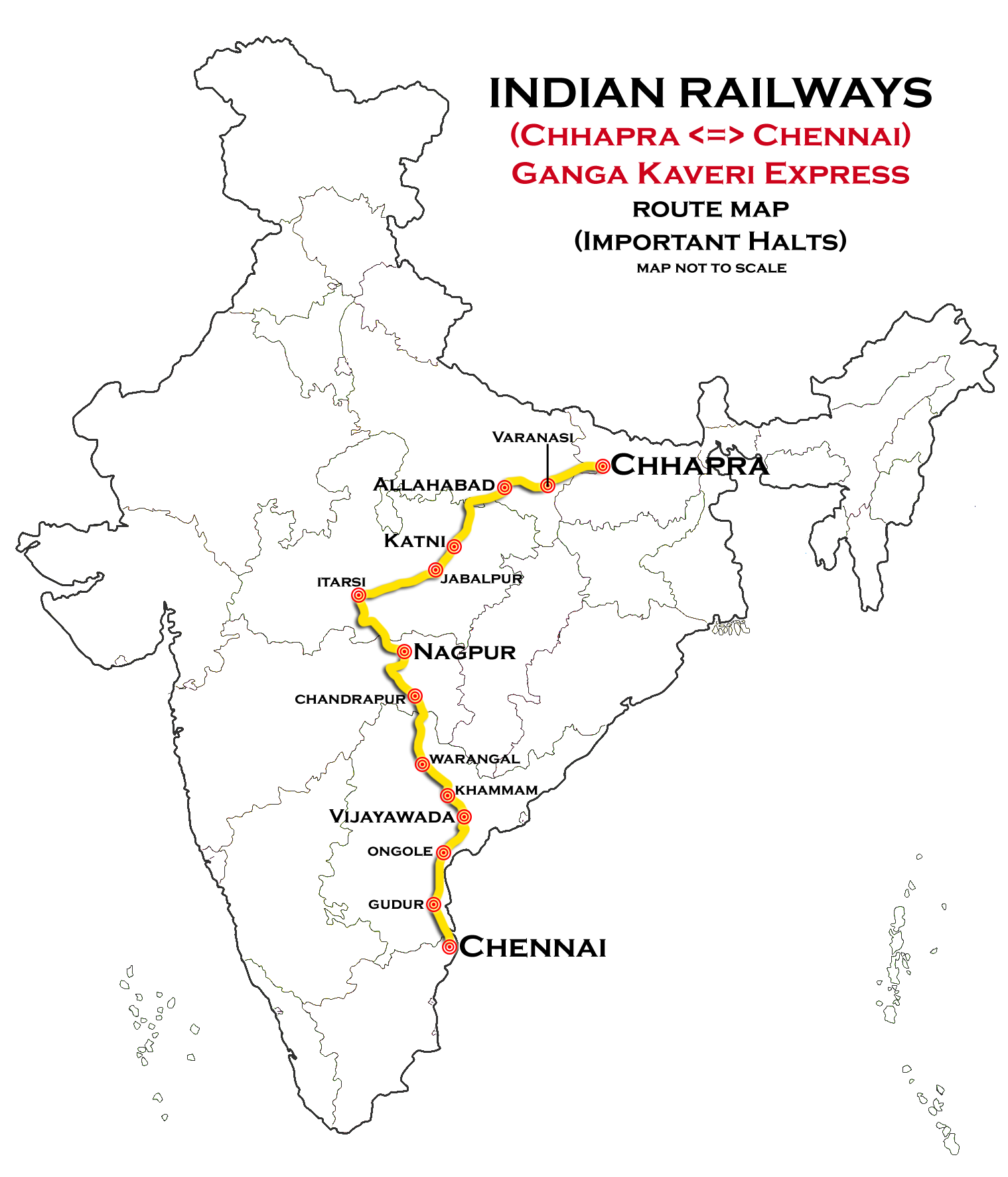

The 12669/12670 Ganga Kaveri Express is a bi-weekly Express train operated by Indian Railways, connecting Chennai in Southern India to Chhapra in Bihar via Vijayawada and Varanasi.

== Overview ==
Started on 16 February 1977 by Kamalpati Tripathi, originally running between Madras (now Chennai) and Varanasi, terminating at Chennai Beach Station. It used the platform previously used by the MG Ganga Kaveri Express to Rameswaram through the Kaveri river basin.

- Name Origin: Named after two Indian rivers: the Ganga, flowing through the holy city of Varanasi, and the Kaveri River, flowing through the southern states of Karnataka and Tamil Nadu.
- Early Service: Train number 139/140 began as a Superfast service between Madras Beach and Varanasi.
- Reclassification: Later reclassified as an Express, renamed Madras–Varanasi Express, shortened to terminate at Madras Central, with AC sleeper coaches introduced and the Green and Yellow rakes withdrawn.
- Reintroduction: In the 1990s, Jaffer Sharief reinstated it as the Ganga Kaveri Express to serve South Indian tourists visiting Varanasi.
- Extension: Extended to Chhapra in December 2006, despite concerns from Varanasi passengers about reduced seat availability.
- Criticism & Requests: Name criticized because the train does not start in Tiruchirappalli or Mysore, near the Kaveri River.
- Popularity: Highly preferred by tourists and senior citizens performing religious rites; remains the only direct train from Chennai to Varanasi.

=== Rake and coach history ===
Originally, the train operated with ICF-designed rakes that included Green and Yellow colored coaches for long-distance Superfast service. After its reclassification as an Express train, these rakes were withdrawn and air-conditioned sleeper coaches were introduced. The coaches upgraded to modern LHB rakes to improve passenger comfort and safety.

== Schedule ==
12669 / 12670 Puratchi Thalaivar Dr. MGR Chennai Central–Chhapra Gangakaveri Express Schedule
Train Type	Superfast
Distance	2342 km (12669) / 2342 km (12670)
Average Speed	~60 km/h
Journey Time (MAS → CPR)	~39 hrs 55 min
Journey Time (CPR → MAS)	~39 hrs 10 min
Classes Available	1A, 2A, 3A, 3E, SL, GEN, PWD
Operating Days	12669: Mon & Sat / 12670: Mon & Sat
Operator	Southern Railway

== Route and halts ==
12669 Puratchi Thalaivar Dr. MGR Chennai Central–Chhapra Gangakaveri Express and 12670 Chhapra–Puratchi Thalaivar Dr. MGR Chennai Central Gangakaveri Express Schedule
Sr.	12669 MAS–CPR				12670 CPR–MAS			
Sr.	Station	Day	Arr.	Dep.	Station	Day	Arr.	Dep.
1	MGR Chennai Central	1	—	17:40	Chhapra Junction	1	—	21:00
2	Gudur Junction	1	19:23	19:25	Ballia	1	22:05	22:10
3	Ongole	1	21:33	21:35	Ghazipur City	1	23:10	23:15
4	Vijayawada Junction	1	23:45	23:55	Varanasi Junction	2	01:10	01:20
5	Khammam	2	01:34	01:35	Bhadohi	2	01:56	01:58
6	Warangal	2	02:49	02:51	Prayagraj Junction	2	04:05	04:30
7	Sirpur Kaghaznagar	2	05:19	05:20	Satna	2	06:55	07:00
8	Balharshah	2	06:55	07:00	Katni	2	08:15	08:20
9	Chandrapur	2	07:15	07:17	Jabalpur	2	10:00	10:10
10	Sevagram	2	09:00	09:02	Pipariya	2	11:58	12:00
11	Nagpur Junction	2	10:25	10:30	Itarsi Junction	2	13:25	13:35
12	Betul	2	12:58	13:00	Betul	2	15:08	15:10
13	Itarsi Junction	2	15:35	15:45	Nagpur Junction	2	18:15	18:20
14	Pipariya	2	16:33	16:35	Sevagram	2	19:18	19:20
15	Jabalpur	2	18:40	18:50	Chandrapur	2	21:05	21:07
16	Katni	2	20:03	20:05	Balharshah	2	22:05	22:10
17	Satna	2	21:15	21:20	Sirpur Kaghaznagar	2	22:59	23:00
18	Prayagraj Junction (Train Reversal)	3	01:45	02:10	Warangal	3	01:23	01:25
19	Bhadohi	3	03:46	03:48	Khammam	3	03:04	03:05
20	Varanasi Junction	3	05:10	05:20	Vijayawada Junction	3	05:10	05:20
21	Ghazipur City	3	06:35	06:40	Ongole	3	07:23	07:25
22	Ballia	3	07:35	07:40	Gudur Junction	3	09:43	09:45
23	Chhapra Junction	3	09:35	—	MGR Chennai Central	3	12:10	—

== Rake sharing ==
The train shares its rake with 12691/12692 MGR Chennai Central-Shivamogga Town Superfast Express.

== Coach composition ==
Category	Coaches	Total
Sleeper cum Luggage Rake (SLRD)	SLRD1, SLRD2	2
General Unreserved (GEN)	GEN1, GEN2, GEN3, GEN4	4
Sleeper Class (SL)	S1, S2, S3, S4, S5, S6	6
Pantry Car (PC)	PC	1
AC 3 Economy (3E)	M1, M2	2
AC 3 Tier (3A)	B1, B2, B3, B4	4
AC 2 Tier (2A)	A1, A2	2
AC First Class (1A)	H1	1
Total Coaches		22

- Primary Maintenance – Basin Bridge Train Care Centre (BBQ) in Chennai
- Secondary Maintenance - Chhapra Coaching Depot

== See also ==
- Tamil Nadu Express
- Sanghamithra Express
- Bagmati Express
- Manikarnika Express
- Indian Railways – Travel Coach types and their seating / berths
