= Coimbatore–Bengaluru Cantonment Vande Bharat Express =

Mini Vande Bharat Express train route in India

Coimbatore Junction – Bengaluru Cantonment Vande Bharat Express
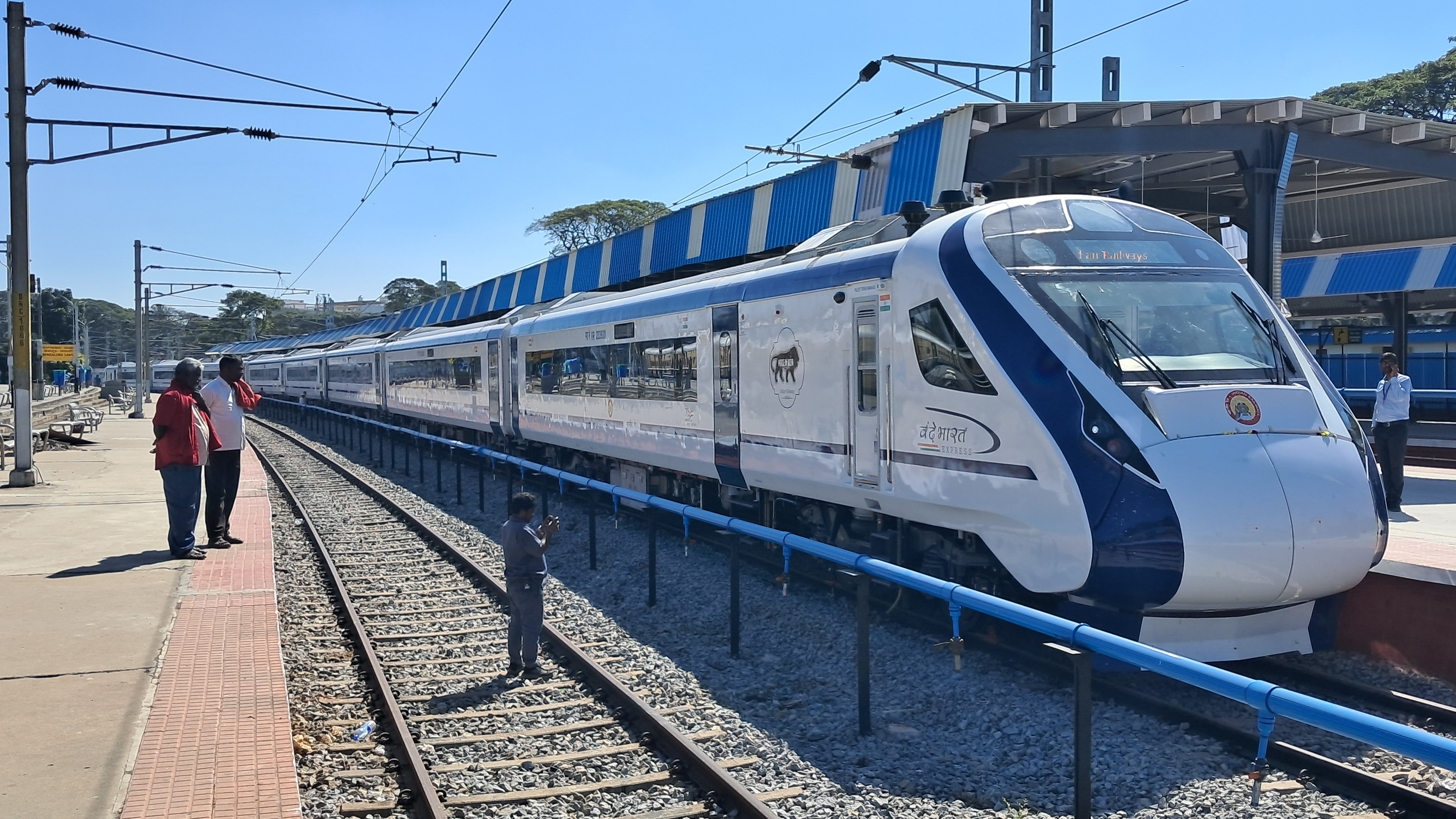
- This Vande Bharat Express at Bengaluru Cantonment

Overview
- Service type: Vande Bharat Express
- Locale: Tamil Nadu and Karnataka
- First service: 30 December 2023 (Inaugural); 01 January 2024; 2 years ago (Commercial)
- Current operator: Southern Railways (SR)

Route
- Termini: Coimbatore Junction (CBE); Bangalore Cantonment (BNC)
- Stops: 5
- Distance travelled: 374 km (232 mi)
- Average journey time: 06 hrs 30 mins
- Service frequency: Six days a week (Except Thursday)
- Train number: 20642 / 20641
- Lines used: Jolarpettai-Shoranur line (Coimbatore Jn to Salem Jn); Salem-Bangalore line (Salem Jn to Belandur Road); Chennai-Bengaluru City line (Belandur Road to Bengaluru Cantt.)

On-board services
- Classes: AC Chair Car, AC Executive Chair Car
- Seating arrangements: Airline style; Rotatable seats
- Sleeping arrangements: No
- Catering facilities: On board Catering
- Observation facilities: Large windows in all coaches
- Entertainment facilities: On-board WiFi; Infotainment System; Electric outlets; Reading light; Seat Pockets; Bottle Holder; Tray Table
- Baggage facilities: Overhead racks
- Other facilities: Kavach

Technical
- Rolling stock: Mini Vande Bharat 2.0
- Track gauge: Indian gauge 1,676 mm (5 ft 6 in) broad gauge
- Electrification: 25 kV 50 Hz AC Overhead line
- Operating speed: 58 km/h (36 mph) (Avg.)
- Average length: 192 metres (630 ft) (08 coaches)
- Track owner: Indian Railways
- Rake maintenance: Coimbatore Jn (CBE)

The 20642/20641 Coimbatore - Bengaluru Cantonment Vande Bharat Express is India's 39th Vande Bharat Express train, connecting Coimbatore in Tamil Nadu and Bangalore in Karnataka. The train was inaugurated on by Prime Minister Narendra Modi via video conferencing from Ayodhya Dham Junction on 30 December 2023 and started scheduled commercial service from 1 January 2024.

== Overview ==
The train is the 39th Vande Bharat express and connects Coimbatore in Tamil Nadu and Bangalore in Karnataka. The train is run by Southern Railway zone of Indian Railways. This train underwent trial runs on the last week of December. The train was inaugurated on by Prime Minister Narendra Modi via video conferencing from Ayodhya Dham Junction on 30 December 2023 and started scheduled commercial service from 1 January 2024.

== Rakes ==
It is the thirty-seventh second generation and twenty-third mini (eight-car) Vande Bharat train-set which was designed and manufactured by the Integral Coach Factory at Perambur, Chennai under the Make in India Initiative.

== Service ==
The 20642/20641 Coimbatore Jn - Bengaluru Cantt Vande Bharat Express operates six days a week except Thursdays, covering a distance of 374 km (232 mi) in a travel time of 6 hours with an average speed of 58 km/h (36 mph). The service has 5 intermediate stops. The Maximum Permissible Speed is 130 km/h (81 mph).

== See also ==
- Vande Bharat Express
- Tejas Express
- Gatimaan Express
- KSR Bengaluru–Coimbatore Uday Express
- Coimbatore Junction railway station
- Bangalore Cantonment railway station
