= Ahmedabad–Saharsa Express =

Train in India

Ahmedabad - Saharsa Express
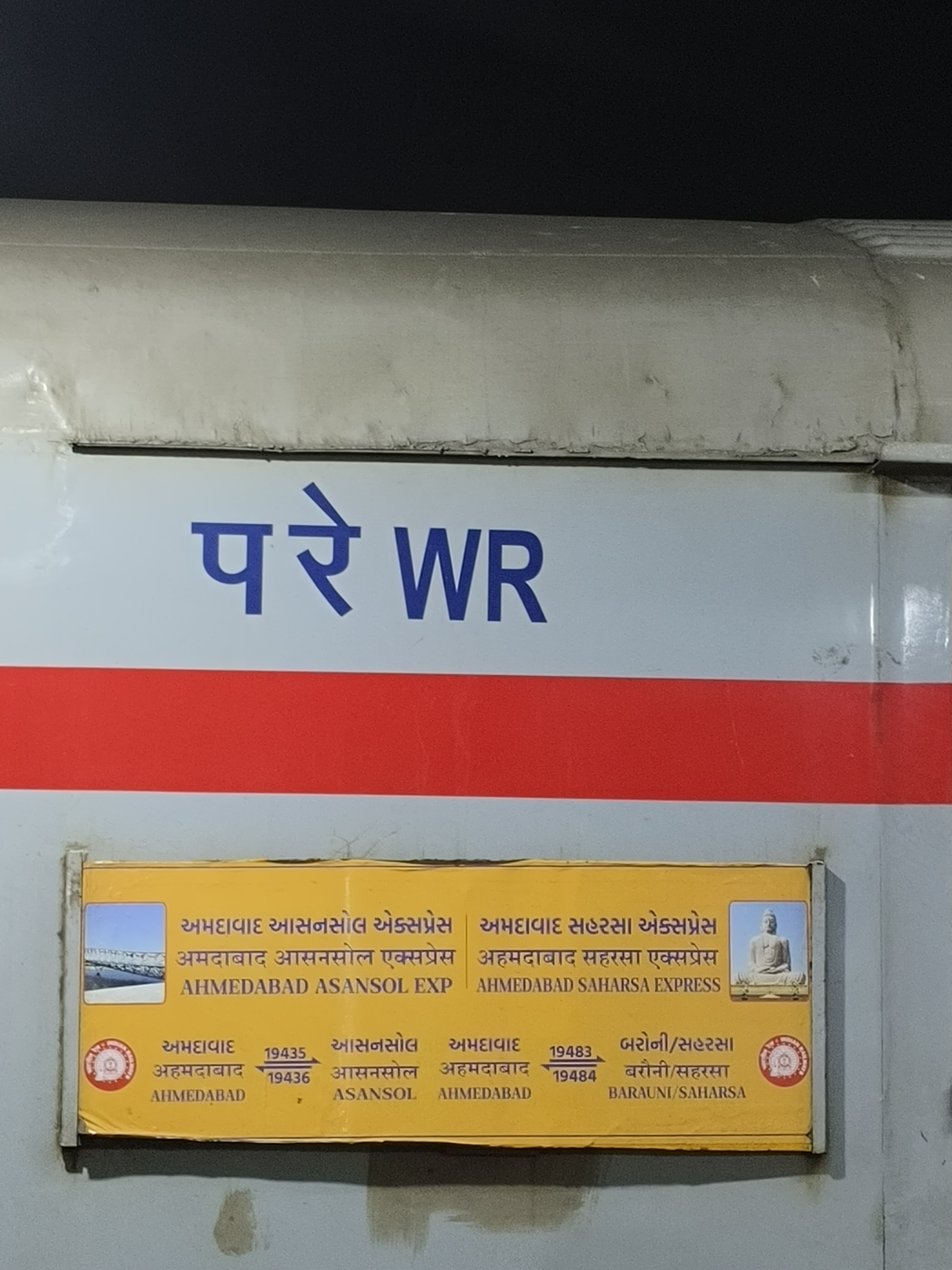
- ADI -SHC - ADI Standing at MFP

Overview
- Service type: Superfast
- First service: 1 May 1989; 37 years ago
- Current operator: Western Railway Secondary maintenance - Saharsa

Route
- Termini: Ahmedabad (ADI); Saharsa (SHC)
- Stops: 29
- Distance travelled: 2,168 km (1,347 mi)
- Service frequency: 6 Days in a Week
- Train number: 19483 / 19484

On-board services
- Classes: AC 2 Tier, AC 3 Tier, AC 3 Tier Economy, Sleeper Class, General Unreserved
- Seating arrangements: Yes
- Sleeping arrangements: Yes
- Catering facilities: Available
- Observation facilities: Large windows
- Baggage facilities: Available
- Other facilities: Below the seats

Technical
- Rolling stock: LHB coach
- Track gauge: 1,676 mm (5 ft 6 in)
- Operating speed: 52 km/h (32 mph) average including halts.

The 19483 / 19484 Ahmedabad–Saharsa Express is an express train that runs between Ahmedabad Junction in Gujarat and Saharsa Junction in Bihar, passing through key stations such as Muzaffarpur, Patliputra, Vadodara, and Surat.

== History ==
Ahmedabad–Saharsa Express, popularly known as the Ahmedabad–Saharsa Sahara Express, was initially introduced as a special train service in 2019 to improve long-distance rail connectivity between Ahmedabad in Gujarat and Bihar. The train operated via Surat, Muzaffarpur Junction, and Patliputra Junction, catering primarily to migrant passengers travelling between western and eastern India.

On 25 January 2021, the service was regularised by Indian Railways. Following regularisation, the train was allotted permanent train numbers 19483 (Ahmedabad–Barauni Express) and 19484 (Barauni–Ahmedabad Express), with regular operations commencing from 1 March 2021.

In 2025, the train’s route was further extended from Barauni Junction to Saharsa Junction via Khagaria, significantly enhancing rail connectivity to the Kosi region of Bihar. With this extension, the service began directly linking Ahmedabad with Saharsa, benefiting passengers from north-eastern Bihar and surrounding areas.

== Schedule ==
19483 / 19484 Ahmedabad–Saharsa Express Schedule
Train Type	Mail/Express
Distance	2270 km (19483) / 2270 km (19484)
Average Speed	~49 km/h
Journey Time (Ahmedabad–Saharsa)	~46 hrs 25 min
Journey Time (Saharsa–Ahmedabad)	~45 hrs 20 min
Classes Available	2A, 3A, 3E, SL, GEN, PWD
Operating Days	6 Days in a Week
Operator	Western Railway

== Route ==
Ahmedabad – Saharsa - Ahmedabad Express
19483 ADI → SHC				19484 SHC → ADI			
Station	Arr.	Dep.	Dist. (km)	Station	Arr.	Dep.	Dist. (km)
Ahmedabad Junction	—	00:35	0	Saharsa Junction	—	16:40	0
Nadiad Junction	01:14	01:16	46	S Bhakhtiyarpur	16:56	16:58	17
Anand Junction	01:30	01:32	64	Mansi Junction	17:51	17:53	45
Vadodara Junction	02:25	02:30	98	Khagaria Junction	18:03	18:05	53
Surat	04:38	04:43	228	Begusarai	18:53	18:55	94
Nandurbar	08:05	08:10	388	Barauni Junction	19:25	19:35	109
Dondaicha	08:44	08:45	422	Samastipur Junction	20:20	20:25	160
Amalner	09:43	09:45	483	Muzaffarpur Junction	22:05	22:10	212
Bhusaval Junction	11:30	11:35	562	Hajipur Junction	23:05	23:10	266
Burhanpur	12:29	12:30	617	Danapur	00:35	00:40	292
Khandwa Junction	13:43	13:45	686	Ara	01:08	01:10	331
Khirkiya	14:35	14:37	762	Buxar	02:00	02:02	400
Itarsi Junction	16:00	16:10	868	Pt. Deen Dayal Upadhyaya Junction	04:53	05:00	490
Rani Kamalapati	17:47	17:52	954	Prayagraj Chheoki	06:55	07:00	634
Lalitpur	20:53	20:55	1161	Chitrakot	09:22	09:24	757
Tikamgarh	21:36	21:38	1213	Banda Junction	10:25	10:30	825
Khargapur	22:22	22:24	1249	Mahoba	11:18	11:20	879
Maharaja Chhatrasal Station Chhatarpur	22:50	22:52	1296	Khajuraho (Train reversal)	12:35	13:00	943
Khajuraho (Train reversal)	00:10	00:35	1327	Maharaja Chhatrasal Station Chhatarpur	13:55	13:57	974
Mahoba	01:50	01:52	1391	Khargapur	14:32	14:34	1021
Banda Junction	02:50	02:55	1445	Tikamgarh	15:00	15:02	1057
Chitrakot	04:00	04:02	1513	Lalitpur	16:05	16:07	1109
Prayagraj Chheoki	07:18	07:20	1636	Rani Kamalapati	20:15	20:20	1316
Pt. Deen Dayal Upadhyaya Junction	09:53	10:00	1780	Itarsi Junction	21:50	22:00	1402
Buxar	11:07	11:09	1870	Khirkiya	23:05	23:07	1508
Ara	12:08	12:10	1939	Khandwa Junction	00:30	00:32	1584
Danapur	12:45	12:50	1978	Burhanpur	01:20	01:21	1653
Hajipur Junction	14:15	14:20	2004	Bhusaval Junction	02:25	02:30	1707
Muzaffarpur Junction	15:40	15:45	2058	Amalner	04:07	04:10	1787
Samastipur Junction	17:05	17:10	2110	Dondaicha	04:58	05:00	1848
Barauni Junction	18:30	18:40	2161	Nandurbar	05:35	05:40	1882
Begusarai	18:56	18:58	2176	Surat	08:07	08:10	2042
Khagaria Junction	20:18	20:20	2217	Vadodara Junction	09:43	09:48	2172
Mansi Junction	20:43	20:45	2225	Anand Junction	10:20	10:22	2206
S Bhakhtiyarpur	21:28	21:30	2253	Nadiad Junction	10:39	10:41	2224
Saharsa Junction	23:00	—	2270	Ahmedabad Junction	12:00	—	2270

== Rake sharing ==
It has rake sharing with

- 19435/19436 Ahmedabad-Asansol Weekly Express

== Coach composition ==
Category	Coaches	Total
Luggage/Parcel Rake (LPR)	LPR	1
General Unreserved (GEN)	GEN1, GEN2, GEN3, GEN4	4
AC 2 Tier (2A)	A1, A2	2
AC 3 Tier (3A)	B1, B2, B3, B4, B5	5
AC 3 Economy (3E)	M1, M2	2
Pantry Car (PC)	PC	1
Sleeper Class (SL)	S1, S2, S3, S4, S5, S6	6
Sleeper cum Luggage Rake (SLRD) (Divyangjan)	SLRD	1
Total Coaches		22

- Primary Maintenance – Ahmedabad CD
- Secondary Maintenance - Saharsa CD
