= Madurai Junction–Bengaluru Cantonment Vande Bharat Express =

Vande Bharat Express train route in India

Madurai Junction - Bengaluru Cantonment Vande Bharat Express
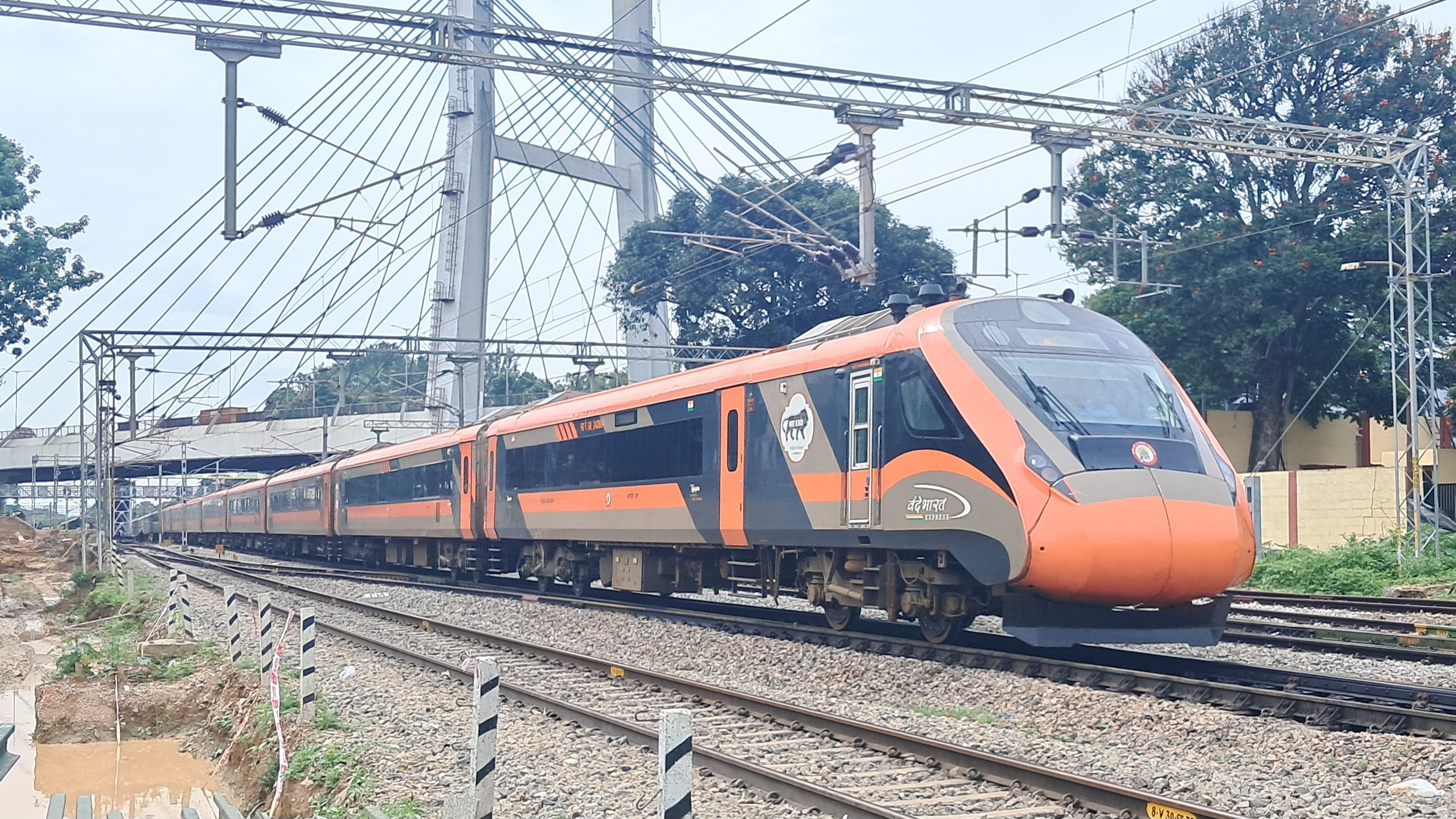
- This Vande Bharat Express departing from Krishnarajapuram and heading towards Madurai Jn.

Overview
- Service type: Vande Bharat Express
- Locale: Tamil Nadu and Karnataka
- First service: 31 August 2024 (Inaugural); 02 September 2024; 21 months ago (Commercial)
- Current operator: Southern Railways (SR)

Route
- Termini: Madurai Junction (MDU); Bengaluru Cantonment (BNC)
- Stops: 6
- Distance travelled: 573 km (356 mi)
- Average journey time: 07 hrs 45 mins
- Service frequency: Six days a week (Note: Except Tuesdays)
- Train number: 20671 / 20672
- Line used: (TBC)

On-board services
- Classes: AC Chair Car, AC Executive Chair Car
- Seating arrangements: Airline style; Rotatable seats
- Sleeping arrangements: No
- Catering facilities: On board Catering
- Observation facilities: Large windows in all coaches
- Entertainment facilities: On-board WiFi; Infotainment System; Electric outlets; Reading light; Seat Pockets; Bottle Holder; Tray Table
- Baggage facilities: Overhead racks
- Other facilities: Kavach

Technical
- Rolling stock: Mini Vande Bharat 2.0 (Last service: Sept 10 2025); Vande Bharat 2.0 (First service: Sept 11 2025)
- Track gauge: Indian gauge 1,676 mm (5 ft 6 in) broad gauge
- Electrification: 25 kV 50 Hz AC Overhead line
- Operating speed: 74 km/h (46 mph) (Avg.)
- Average length: 192 metres (630 ft) (08 coaches)
- Track owner: Indian Railways
- Rake maintenance: Madurai Jn (MDU)

The 20671/20672 Madurai Junction - Bengaluru Cantonment Vande Bharat Express is India's 53rd Vande Bharat Express train, connecting the Temple city of Madurai in Tamil Nadu with the Silicon City of Bangalore in Karnataka. This express train was initially slated to be inaugurated on 20 June 2024, but has been postponed due to administrative reasons. Later, it was inaugurated on 31 August 2024 by Prime Minister Narendra Modi via video conferencing from New Delhi.

== History ==
During the trial run for this express, it was scheduled to take place on June 17, 2024, where it would depart from Madurai in the morning and terminate at SMVT Bengaluru in the afternoon. This trainset (Rake number 61) would depart from SMVT Bengaluru post noon and would reach Madurai in the night as Madurai SMVT Bangalore Vandebharat Express but during inaugural run and at regular commercial run, it has been provided a new destination at Bangalore Cantonment along with additional stoppage at Namakkal.

== Overview ==
This express train is operated by Indian Railways, connecting Madurai Junction, Dindigul Jn, Trichy Jn, Karur Jn, Namakkal, Salem Jn, Krishnarajapuram and Bengaluru Cantonment. It is currently operated with train numbers 20671/20672 on 6 days a week basis.

== Rakes ==
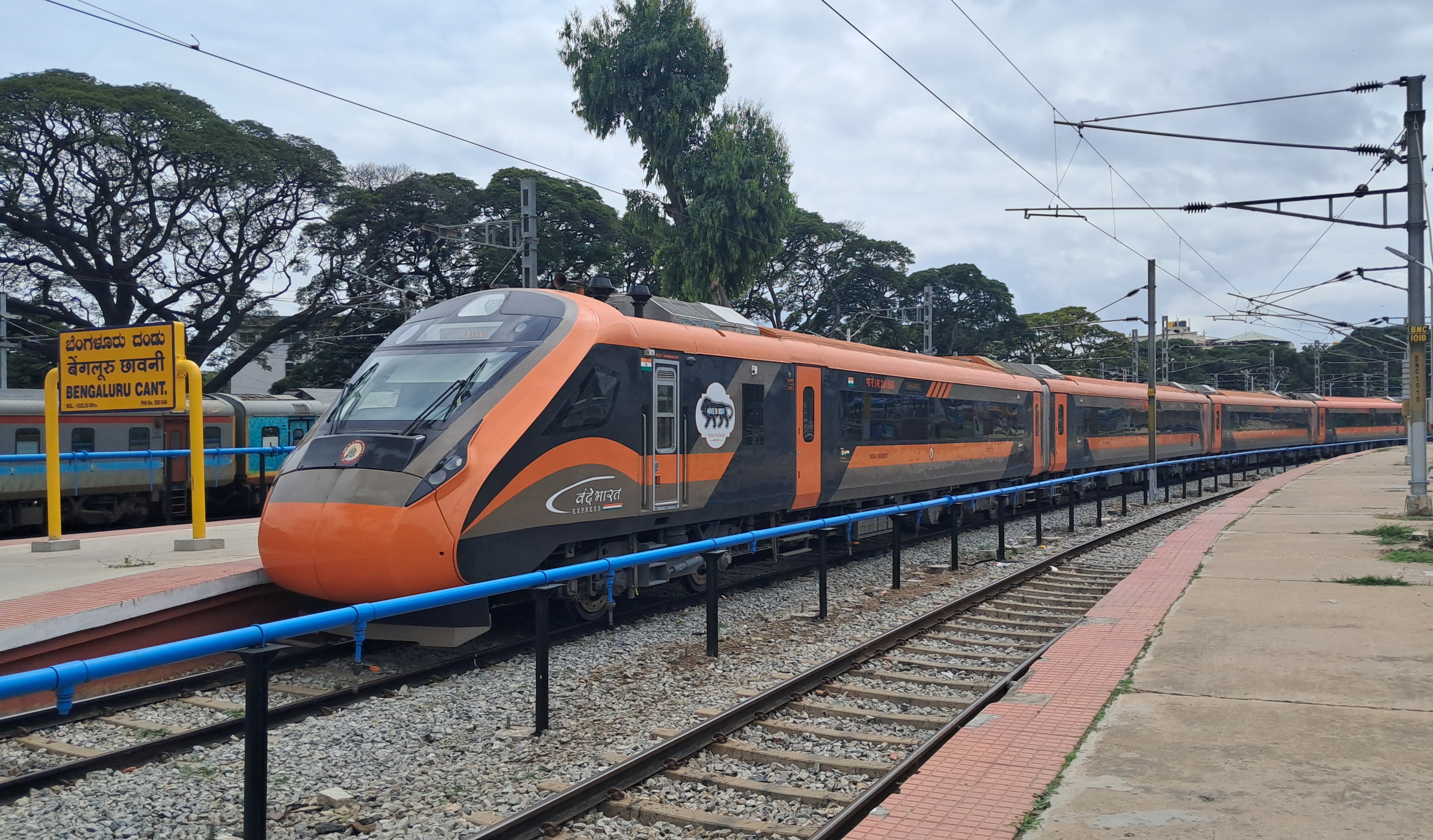
Formerly running 08-Coach Mini VB rake departing from Bengaluru Cantonment railway station

It was the fifty-first 2nd Generation and thirty-fifth Mini Vande Bharat 2.0 Express train which was designed and manufactured by the Integral Coach Factory at Perambur, Chennai under the Make in India Initiative.

=== Coach augmentation ===
As of September 2025, this express train was augmented with 8 additional AC coaches and is currently running with Vande Bharat 2.0 trainset (formerly used by Mangaluru–Trivandrum VB train), in order to meet the surge in passenger demand on this popular route.

== Service ==
The 20671/20672 Madurai Jn - Bengaluru Cantt Vande Bharat Express operates six days a week except Tuesdays, covering a distance of 573 km (356 mi) in a travel time of 7 hours with an average speed of 74 km/h (46 mph). The service has 6 intermediate stops. The Maximum Permissible Speed is 130 km/h (81 mph).

== See also ==
- Vande Bharat Express
- Tejas Express
- Gatimaan Express
- Madurai Junction railway station
- Bengaluru Cantonment railway station
