= Bhagalpur–Danapur Intercity Express =

Train in India

Bhagalpur-Danapur Intercity Express
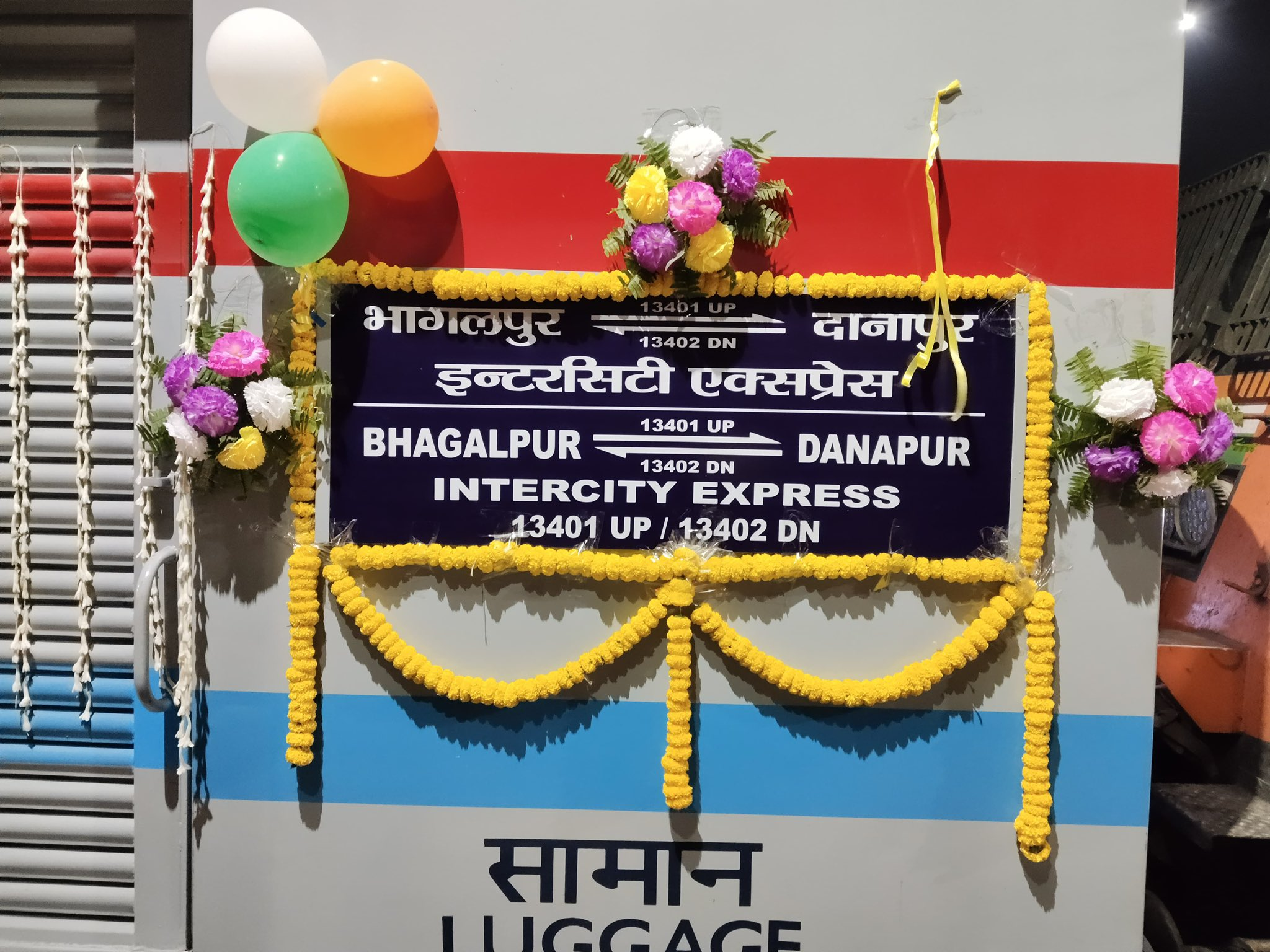

Overview
- Service type: Express
- First service: 28 June 1998; 27 years ago
- Current operator: Eastern Railway

Route
- Termini: Bhagalpur (BGP); Danapur (DNR)
- Stops: 25
- Distance travelled: 231 km (144 mi)
- Average journey time: 7 hours 10 minutes
- Service frequency: Daily
- Train number: 13401 / 13402

On-board services
- Classes: AC 3 Tier, AC Chair Car, Second Class Seating, General Unreserved
- Seating arrangements: Yes
- Sleeping arrangements: Yes
- Auto-rack arrangements: Overhead racks
- Catering facilities: On-board catering, E-catering
- Observation facilities: Large windows
- Baggage facilities: No
- Other facilities: Below the seats

Technical
- Rolling stock: LHB coach
- Track gauge: 1,676 mm (5 ft 6 in)
- Operating speed: 34 km/h (21 mph) average including halts.

The 13401 / 13402 Bhagalpur-Danapur Intercity Express is an express train belonging to Indian Railways Eastern Railway zone that runs between Bhagalpur Junction and Danapur in India.

It operates as train number 13401 from Bhagalpur Junction to Danapur and as train number 13402 in the reverse direction serving the states of Bihar.

== Coaches ==
The 13401 / 02 Bhagalpur - Danapur Intercity Express has one AC chair car, 14 general unreserved & two SLR (seating with luggage rake) coaches . It does not carry a pantry car coach.

As is customary with most train services in India, coach composition may be amended at the discretion of Indian Railways depending on demand.

== Service ==
The 13401 Bhagalpur Junction - Danapur Intercity Express covers the distance of 231 km (144 mi) in 7 hours 05 mins (33 km/h) and in 6 hours 10 mins as the 13402 Danapur - Bhagalpur Junction Intercity Express (38 km/h).

As the average speed of the train is lower than 55 km/h (34 mph), as per railway rules, its fare doesn't includes a Superfast surcharge.

== Routing ==
The 13401 / 02 Bhagalpur - Danapur Intercity Express runs from Bhagalpur Junction via Jamalpur Junction, Kiul Junction to Danapur.

== Traction ==
As the route is fully electrified, a Samastipur Loco Shed or DDU Loco Shed-based WAP-4 electric locomotive pulls the train to its destination.
