= Tatanagar–Buxar Express =

Train in India

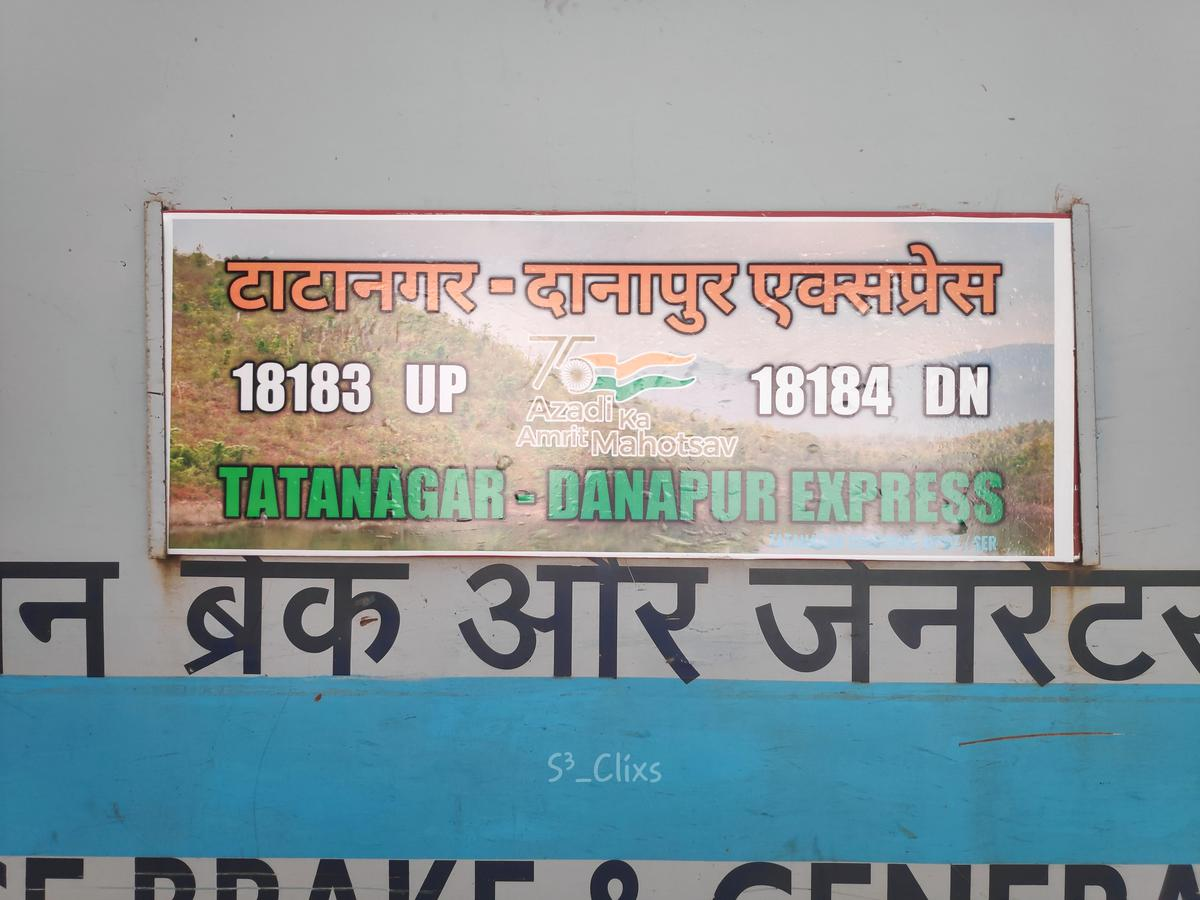

Overview
- Service type: Express
- Status: Active
- First service: 9 July 1984; 42 years ago (extended to Buxar)
- Current operator: South Eastern Railway

Route
- Termini: Tatanagar (TATA); Buxar (BXR)
- Stops: 35
- Distance travelled: 614 km (382 mi)
- Average journey time: 14hrs 50mins as 18183 14hrs 30mins as 18184
- Service frequency: Daily (Note: Runs seven days in a week for every direction)
- Train number: 18183 / 18184

On-board services
- Classes: AC Three Tier, AC Three Tier Economy, AC Chair Car, Second Sitting, General Unreserved
- Seating arrangements: Yes
- Sleeping arrangements: Yes
- Catering facilities: On-board catering E-catering is available at ARA, PNBE, KIUL, JAJ, JSME, MDP, ASN, PRR & TATA.
- Observation facilities: Large windows
- Baggage facilities: Available

Technical
- Rolling stock: LHB coach
- Track gauge: 1,676 mm (5 ft 6 in)
- Operating speed: 44 km/h (27 mph) average including halts

The 18183 / 18184 Tatanagar–Buxar Express is an Express train belonging to South Eastern Railway zone that runs between Tatanagar Junction and Buxar in India. It is currently being operated with 18183/18184 train numbers on daily basis.

== History ==
Starting on 12 September 2023, a train was extended to Ara from its previous origin point in Danapur. Subsequently on 8 March 2024, The train was extended to Buxar. Additionally, the train received its LHB coach on 25 January 2022.

== Service ==
The 18183/Tatanagar–Buxar Super Express has an average speed of 42 km/h and covers 614 km in 14h 35m. The 18184/Buxar–Tatanagar Super Express has an average speed of 44 km/h and covers 614 km in 13h 50m.

== Coach composition ==
The train has 2 LHB rakes with a max speed of 130 kmph. The train consists of 20 coaches:

- 2 AC Three Tier
- 3 AC Three Tier Economy
- 2 AC Chair Car
- 5 Reserved Second Sitting
- 6 Unreserved Second Sitting
- 1 Seating cum Luggage Rake
- 1 Generator Car

Loco	1	2	3	4	5	6	7	8	9	10	11	12	13	14	15	16	17	18	19	20
	SLRD	C1	C2	B1	B2	M1	M2	M3	D1	D2	D3	D4	D5	GS	GS	GS	GS	GS	GS	EOG

== Traction ==
Both trains are hauled by a Tatanagar Loco Shed based WAP-7 electric locomotive from Tatanagar to Asansol Junction. From Asansol Junction both trains are hauled by a Gomoh Loco Shed or Samastipur Loco Shed based WAP-7 electric locomotive up to Buxar and vice versa.

== Direction reversal ==
The train reverses its direction once:

- Asansol Junction

== See also ==
- Tatanagar Junction railway station
- Buxar railway station
