= Ahmedabad–Asansol Weekly Express =

Train in India

Overview
- Service type: Express
- Status: Operational
- Locale: Gujarat, Maharashtra, Madhya Pradesh, Uttar Pradesh, Bihar, Jharkhand, West Bengal
- First service: September 26, 2021; 4 years ago
- Current operator: Western Railway zone

Route
- Termini: Ahmedabad Junction (ADI); Asansol Junction (ASN)
- Stops: 28
- Distance travelled: 2,326 km (1,445 mi)
- Average journey time: 40 hours 10 minutes
- Service frequency: Weekly
- Train number: 19435/36

On-board services
- Classes: 2A, 3A, 3E, SL, GEN, PC
- Seating arrangements: Yes
- Sleeping arrangements: Yes
- Catering facilities: Pantry car, on-board catering, e-catering
- Observation facilities: Large windows in AC coaches
- Baggage facilities: Available

Technical
- Rolling stock: LHB coaches
- Track gauge: 1,676 mm (5 ft 6 in)
- Operating speed: Maximum: 110 km/h (68 mph); Average: 53 km/h (33 mph)

The Ahmedabad–Asansol Weekly Express is a weekly Express train operated by the Western Railway zone of Indian Railways. It connects Ahmedabad Junction (ADI) in Gujarat with Asansol Junction (ASN) in West Bengal, covering a distance of approximately 2,325 km (1,445 mi) in about 40 hours and 10 minutes. The train operates with train numbers 19435 (Ahmedabad to Asansol) and 19436 (Asansol to Ahmedabad) and was inaugurated on 26 September 2021.

== History ==
The Ahmedabad–Asansol Weekly Express was introduced to enhance connectivity between Ahmedabad, a major economic hub in western India, and Asansol, a key industrial and railway junction in eastern India. The train was launched to cater to the growing demand for direct travel options between Gujarat and the coal and steel belt of West Bengal. Linen services were restored on 4 August 2022, and from 21 December 2023, two sleeper coaches were replaced with Third AC Economy (3E) coaches to accommodate more passengers.

== Route ==
The train traverses seven states — Gujarat, Maharashtra, Madhya Pradesh, Uttar Pradesh, Bihar, Jharkhand, and West Bengal —covering 2,325 km (1,445 mi) with 28 halts across 396 intermediate stations. Major stops include:

- Vadodara Junction (BRC) (5-minute halt)
- Ratlam Junction (RTM)
- Kota Junction (KOTA)
- Khajuraho Junction (KURJ) (25-minute halt)
- Patna Junction (PNBE)
- Jasidih Junction (JSME)
- Chittaranjan (CRJ)

The route connects key cultural and industrial centers, including the UNESCO World Heritage Site of Khajuraho and the industrial hub of Asansol.

== Schedule ==
- 19435 (Ahmedabad to Asansol): Departs Ahmedabad Junction at 00:35 IST on Thursdays and arrives at Asansol Junction at 20:45 IST on Fridays.
- 19436 (Asansol to Ahmedabad): Departs Asansol Junction at 19:45 IST on Sundays and arrives at Ahmedabad Junction at 11:50 IST on Tuesdays.

== Coach composition ==
The train operates with 21 LHB coaches:

- 1 Second AC (2A)
- 4 Third AC (3A)
- 2 Third AC Economy (3E)
- 10 Sleeper (SL)
- 3 General unreserved (GEN)
- 1 Pantry car (PC)
- 1 Brake van
- 1 Power car
- 1 End-on-generator (EOG)

The rake is shared with train numbers 19483/84 Ahmedabad–Saharsa Express and undergoes primary maintenance at Kankaria (KKF) and secondary maintenance at Asansol (ASN).

== Loco reversal ==
The train has a loco Reversal at Khajuraho.

== Operations ==
The train is hauled by a Vadodara Loco Shed WAP-7 locomotive from Ahmedabad to Asansol and vice versa, ensuring high-speed and reliable performance.

== Cultural impact ==
The train serves as a vital link for communities in Gujarat and West Bengal, facilitating travel for business, family visits, and tourism. It connects Ahmedabad, known for its Sabarmati Ashram and textile industry, with Asansol, a hub for coal mining and steel production. The route also supports pilgrims visiting Khajuraho and Patna, enhancing regional tourism.
