= Rajgriha Express =

Train in India

Koderma-Danapur Intercity Express
Overview
- Service type: Express
- Locale: Bihar and Jharkhand
- First service: 15 February 2002; 24 years ago
- Current operator: East Central Railway

Route
- Termini: Koderma (KQR); Danapur (DNR)
- Stops: 12
- Distance travelled: 259 km (161 mi)
- Average journey time: 7 hrs 5 mins
- Service frequency: Daily
- Train number: 13233 / 13234

On-board services
- Classes: AC Chair Car, Second Class Seating, General Unreserved, AC Three Tier
- Seating arrangements: Yes
- Sleeping arrangements: Yes
- Auto-rack arrangements: Overhead racks
- Catering facilities: E-catering only
- Observation facilities: Large windows
- Baggage facilities: No
- Other facilities: Below the seats

Technical
- Rolling stock: LHB coach
- Track gauge: 1,676 mm (5 ft 6 in)
- Operating speed: 37 km/h (23 mph) average including halts.

The 13233 / 13234 Koderma-Danapur Intercity Express also known as Rajgriha Express is a daily Express train of Indian Railways, running between Koderma, Jharkhand, and Danapur, near Patna, Bihar, via Rajgir, Bihar Sharif and Bakhtiyarpur Junction.

It earlier ran between Rajgir and Danapur and was extended to Koderma on 12th September, 2025.
