= Danapur railway station =

Railway station in Patna, Bihar, India

DANAPUR

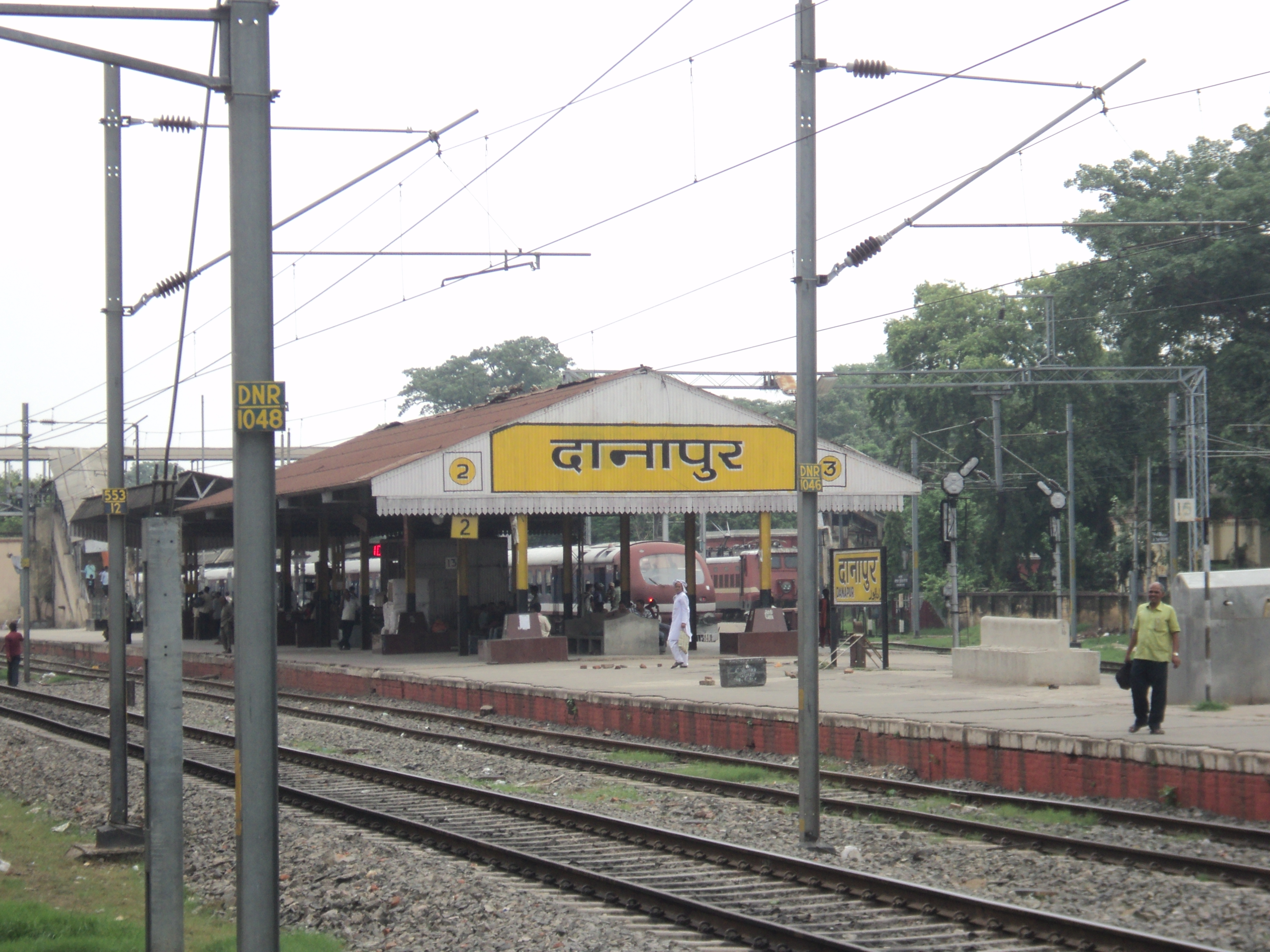
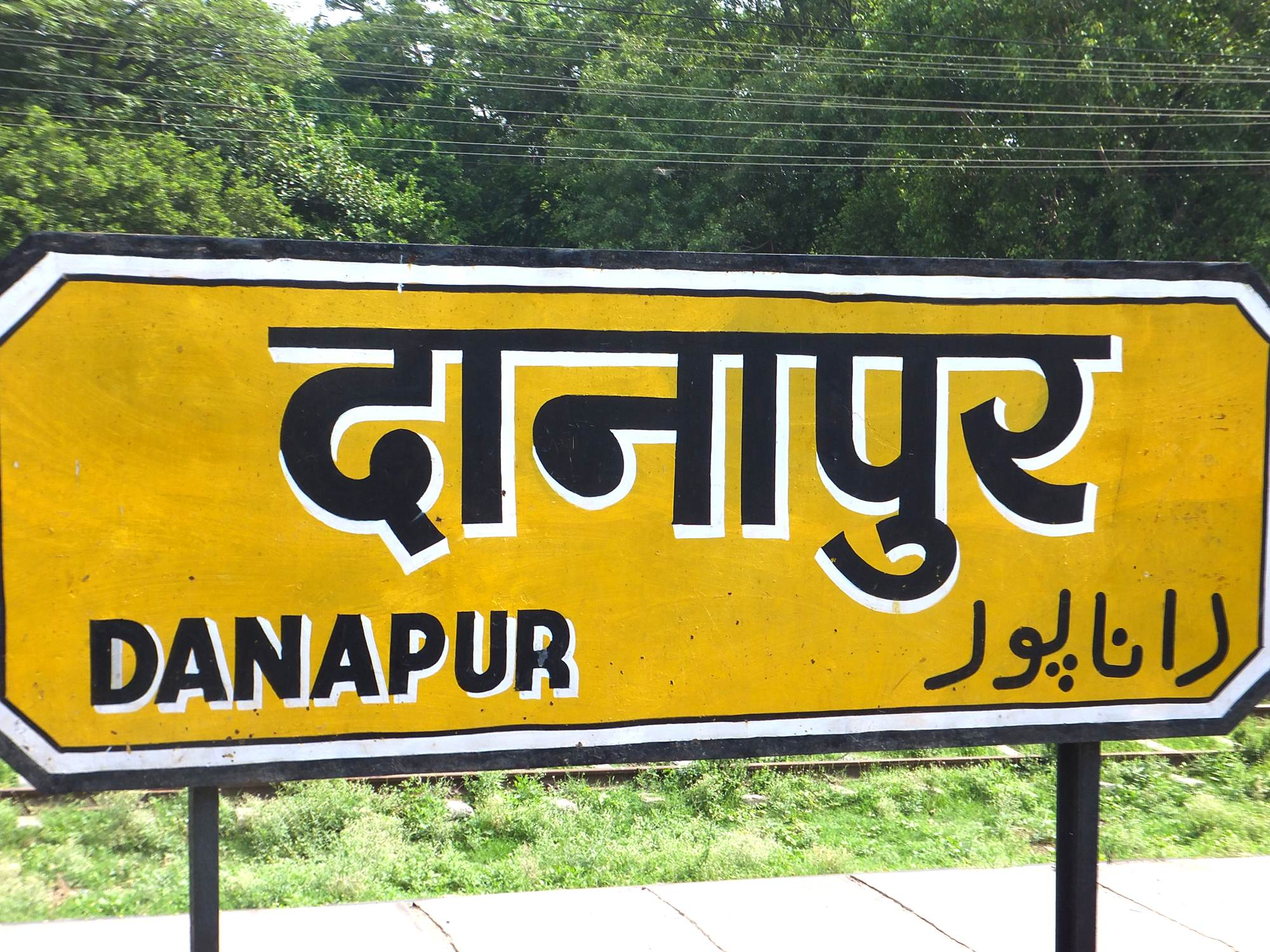
- View of the platform with the station nameboard

General information
- Location: Khagaul, Danapur, Patna district, Bihar; India
- Coordinates: 25°34′56″N 85°2′36″E
- Elevation: 58 metres (190 ft)
- System: Indian Railways station
- Owner: Indian Railways
- Operator: East Central Railways
- Lines: Howrah–Delhi main line (Patna–Pandit Deen Dayal Upadhyaya section); Patna–Sonepur–Hajipur section
- Platforms: 6+1(Under Construction)
- Tracks: 10

Construction
- Structure type: Standard (on-ground station)
- Parking: Available
- Accessible: Available

Other information
- Status: Functional; Wifi Enabled
- Station code: DNR
- Zone(s): East Central Railway
- Division(s): Danapur

History
- Opened: 1860; 166 years ago
- Electrified: 14 September 2000; 26 years ago
- Former names: Dinapur Railway Station

Passengers
- 2018: 16,305 (Daily)
Services
Preceding station	Indian Railways	Following station
East Central Railway zone
Neora towards Mughalsarai Junction or New Delhi	Howrah–Delhi main line Patna–Mughalsarai section	Phulwari Sharif towards Patna Junction or Howrah Junction
Terminus	Patna–Sonepur–Hajipur section	Patliputra Junction across Ganga Rail–Road Bridge towards Sonpur Junction or Hajipur Junction
Route map
Location
- Location within India Location within Bihar Location within Patna
- Interactive map of Danapur

Danapur Railway Station or Danapur Junction, station code DNR, is a large railway station and the headquarters of Danapur railway division of East Central Railway. Danapur is connected to metropolitan areas of India by the Delhi–Kolkata main line via Mughalsarai–Patna route. It is in Khagaul city about 6 km from Danapur Cantonment, in Patna district in the Indian state of Bihar.

Due to its location on the Howrah–Patna–Mughalsarai main line, many Patna and Barauni-bound express trains coming from Howrah and Sealdah stop here. It lies between Neora to the west and Phulwari Sharif to the east. Another line branches north-eastwards from Danapur and joins Patna–Sonepur line at Patliputra Junction.

There are refreshment rooms, vegetarian and non-vegetarian food stall, tea stall, book stall, post and telegraphic office, telephone booth, Government Railway Police (GRP) office and Railway Protection Force (RPF) barracks.

Recently Danapur station has been redesigned with street art motifs on its façade, dedicated to the famous mathematician born in Bihar, Aryabhata.

== History ==
Danapur (formerly Dinapur) railway station was built in the 1860s. Old Patna station (now Patna Sahib station) in Patna City and the then Bankipore station on the Howrah-Delhi line (near the site of the present Patna Junction built much later) were also built at this time.

== Electrification ==
Danapur station was electrified in March 2000 and passed the CRS inspection on 14 September 2000. Sector-wise electrification was as follows: Fatuha – Danapur between 1999–2000 and Danapur – Dildarnagar between 2001 and 2002.

== Facilities ==
The major facilities available are waiting room, free wifi from railwire, computerized reservation facility and vehicle parking. The vehicles are allowed to enter the station premises. The station also has STD/ISD/PCO telephone booth, toilets, tea stall and book stall. The Danapur station was given a new look in 2012.

=== Platforms ===
There are 6 platforms at Danapur. The platforms are interconnected with three foot overbridge (FOB). Newly developed platform is not in sequence. It is situated in line of platform No 1 towards Patna Jn.

== Construction ==
East Central Railway is constructing a new platform (number 6), at an estimated cost of Rs 2.33 crore, on the southern end of the station. The work is in progress with a provision to accommodate 24 coach load combination of mail and express trains at the new platform. Under the new development plan, the railways has also decided to connect platform number 6 to platform numbers 2, 3, 4 and 5 by building a new spacious foot over bridge (FOB) at a cost of Rs 5.2 crore.

A new 92metre-long and 6metre-wide FOB is also proposed. This will connect platform #1A to the new platform (number 6), to facilitate passengers’ easy movement within the station premises. The railways is also constructing a new platform shed with 48 metre in length and 12 metre in width on platform numbers 4 and 5 to provide comforts to passengers.

The EC-Railways would also build an air conditioned waiting hall at Danapur at an estimated cost of Rs 1.57 crore.

The station has already provision for one pair of escalators and two lifts in the years to come.

== Major Trains ==
Danapur is the Major railway station serving several express and mail trains.

Major trains originating and halting at Danapur railway station are as follows:

Train Nº	Name
26301 / 26302	Jogbani–Danapur Vande Bharat Express
12423 / 12424	Dibrugarh - New Delhi Rajdhani Express
12309 / 12310	Rajendra Nagar–New Delhi Tejas Rajdhani Express
13235 / 13236	Sahibganj–Danapur Intercity Express
13247 / 13248	Kamakhya–Arrah Junction Capital Express
13245 / 13246	New Jalpaiguri-Arrah Junction Capital Express
18183 / 18184	Danapur–Tatanagar Super Express
15645 / 15646	Lokmanya Tilak Terminus–Dibrugarh Express
15589 / 15590	Muzaffarpur–Hadapsar (Pune) AC Express
12520 / 12519	Lokmanya Tilak Terminus–Agartala AC Express
15483 / 15484	Alipurduar - Delhi Junction Mahananda Express
12505 / 12506	Kamakhya–Anand Vihar Terminal North East Express
15647 / 15648	Lokmanya Tilak Terminus–Guwahati Express
19669 / 19670	Udaipur City–Patliputra Humsafar Express
16602 / 16601	Erode–Jogbani Amrit Bharat Express
11015 / 11016	Mumbai LTT–Saharsa Amrit Bharat Express
22361 / 22362	Rajendra Nagar Terminal–New Delhi Amrit Bharat Express
15293 / 15294	Muzaffarpur–Charlapalli Amrit Bharat Express
12436 / 12435	Jaynagar–Anand Vihar Garib Rath Express
22405 / 22406	Bhagalpur–Anand Vihar Terminal Garib Rath Express
19435 / 19436	Ahmedabad-Asansol Weekly Express
13005 / 13006	Howrah - Amritsar Mail
12303 / 12304	Howrah - New Delhi Poorva Express
12333 / 12334	Howrah - Prayagraj Vibhuti Express
12331 / 12332	Howrah - Jammu Tawi Himgiri Superfast Express
15733 / 15734	Farakka Express (via Sultanpur)
15743 / 15744	Farakka Express (via Ayodhya Cantt)
12577 / 12578	Mysore - Darbhanga Bhagmati Express
13233 / 13234	Danapur–Rajgir Rajgriha Express
03483 / 03484	Malda Town–Danapur Special Fare Special
53231 / 53232	Tilaiya–Danapur Passenger
63219 / 63220	Danapur–Raghunathpur MEMU
12791 / 12792	Secunderabad–Danapur Express
13401 / 13402	Bhagalpur–Danapur Intercity Express
13257 / 13258	Danapur–Anand Vihar Jan Sadharan Express
19063 / 19064	Udhna–Danapur Bi-Weekly Express
63217 / 63218	Mokama–Danapur MEMU
63339 / 63340	Rajgir–Danapur MEMU
12295 / 12296	KSR Bengaluru Sanghamitra Express
12149 / 12150	Danapur–Pune Superfast Express
13226/13225	Danapur - Jaynagar InterCity Express

== Nearest airports ==
The nearest airports to Danapur Station are

- Lok Nayak Jayaprakash Airport, Patna 5 kilometres (3.1 mi)
- Gaya Airport 104 kilometres (65 mi)
- Birsa Munda Airport, Ranchi 230 kilometres (140 mi)
- Netaji Subhash Chandra Bose International Airport, Kolkata 600 kilometres (370 mi)

== See also ==
- Ara Junction railway station
- Patliputra Junction railway station
- Phulwari Sharif railway station
- Rajendra Nagar Terminal railway station
