= Bhagmati Express =

Train in India

Bagmati Superfast Express

Overview
- Service type: Superfast
- Locale: Karnataka, Tamil Nadu, Andhra Pradesh, Telangana, Maharashtra, Madhya Pradesh, Uttar Pradesh & Bihar
- First service: 23 February 2007; 19 years ago
- Current operator: East Central Railway

Route
- Termini: Darbhanga (DBG); Mysuru Junction (MYS)
- Stops: 37
- Distance travelled: 3,036 km (1,886 mi)
- Average journey time: 53 hrs 30 min
- Service frequency: Weekly
- Train number: 12577 / 12578

On-board services
- Classes: AC First Class, AC 2 Tier, AC 3 Tier, AC 3 Tier Economy, Sleeper Class, General Unreserved
- Seating arrangements: Yes
- Sleeping arrangements: Yes
- Catering facilities: Available
- Observation facilities: Large windows
- Baggage facilities: Available
- Other facilities: Below the seats

Technical
- Rolling stock: LHB coach
- Track gauge: 1,676 mm (5 ft 6 in); Broad Gauge
- Operating speed: 57 km/h (35 mph) average including halts.
Route map
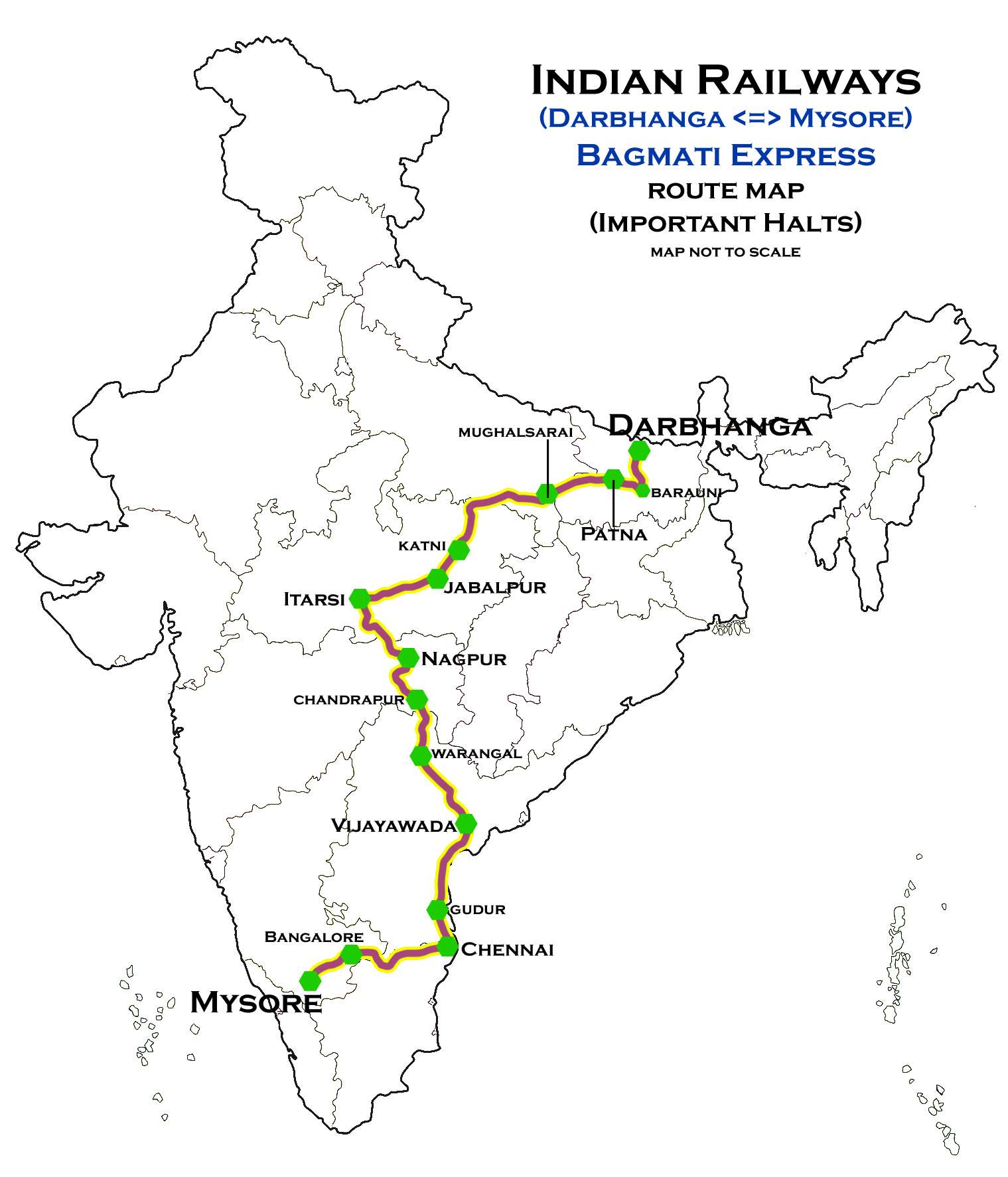
- Bagmati Express (Darbhanga–Mysore) route map

The 12577 / 12578 Bagmati Superfast Express is a weekly superfast express train from Darbhanga in Bihar to Mysore in Karnataka. A 3036 km long route and it is operating by Indian Railways–East Central Railway zone. It is the only direct train from Mysuru and darbhanga.

This train is named after the Bagmati River which originates in Nepal and flows through Darbhanga.

== Overview ==
Bagmati Express is one of the most important train for the passengers of Bihar. Inaugural Run was Fri 23 Feb 2007 from Darbhanga Junction. It connects the Indian states of Bihar, Uttar Pradesh, Madhya Pradesh, Maharashtra, Telangana, Andhra Pradesh, Tamil Nadu, Karnataka.

== Coach composition ==
The coach composition of the 12577 / 12578 train is:

- 1 AC I Tier
- 2 AC II Tier
- 6 AC III Tier
- 1 AC III Tier Economy
- 6 Sleeper coaches
- 3 General Unreserved
- 1 Pantry car
- 2 End On Generator cars (EOG)

== Route and halts ==
It runs, from Darbhanga via Samastipur Junction, Barauni Junction, Mokama Junction, Patna Junction, Danapur, Ara Junction, Buxar, Pt. Deen Dayal Upadhyay Junction, Prayagraj Chheoki, Satna Junction, Katni Junction, Jabalpur Junction, Itarsi Junction, Nagpur Junction, Balharshah Junction, Warangal, Vijayawada Junction, Ongole,Gudur Junction, Chennai Central, Arakkonam Junction, Katpadi Junction, KSR Bengaluru City to Mysore.

== Traction ==
Earlier it was hauled by a WDP-4D diesel locomotive. Now it is hauled by a Gomoh Loco Shed or Samastipur Loco Shed-based WAP-7 and WAP-4 electric locomotive from Darbhanga to Mysuru and vice versa.

== Accident ==
On 11 October 2024, two trains collided near Chennai in the Indian state of Tamil Nadu. Bagmati Express, a passenger train, Train no. 12578, collided with a stationary goods train near Kavaraipettai railway station in Tiruvallur district. The accident resulted in a fire break out in 2 coaches, the derailment of 13 coaches of the Bagmati Express in which at least 19 people were injured.

The probe into the accident revealed a possibility of a sabotage, where components of the track interlocking system were forcefully removed. The initial investigation revealed that components like nuts and bolts, signalling gears and switch point connecting rods were tampered with.

The investigation team, which consisted of seven officials including four senior section engineers submitted a joint observation report on October 12, 2024. The report did not find any conclusive findings that led to the accident.

== See also ==
- Ganga Kaveri Express
