= Danapur–Anand Vihar Jan Sadharan Express =

Train in India

Danapur – Anand Vihar Terminal Jan Sadharan Express

Overview
- Service type: Jan Sadharan Express
- Locale: Bihar, Uttar Pradesh & Delhi
- Current operator: East Central Railways

Route
- Termini: Danapur (DNR); Anand Vihar Terminal (ANVT)
- Stops: 6
- Distance travelled: 990 km (615 mi)
- Average journey time: 18 hours 40 minutes
- Service frequency: Daily
- Train number: 13257 / 13258

On-board services
- Class: General Unreserved (Deen Dayalu)
- Seating arrangements: Yes
- Sleeping arrangements: No
- Catering facilities: No
- Observation facilities: Large windows

Technical
- Rolling stock: LHB coach
- Track gauge: 1,676 mm (5 ft 6 in)
- Operating speed: 110 km/h (68 mph) maximum, 60.92 km/h (38 mph) average including halts
Route map
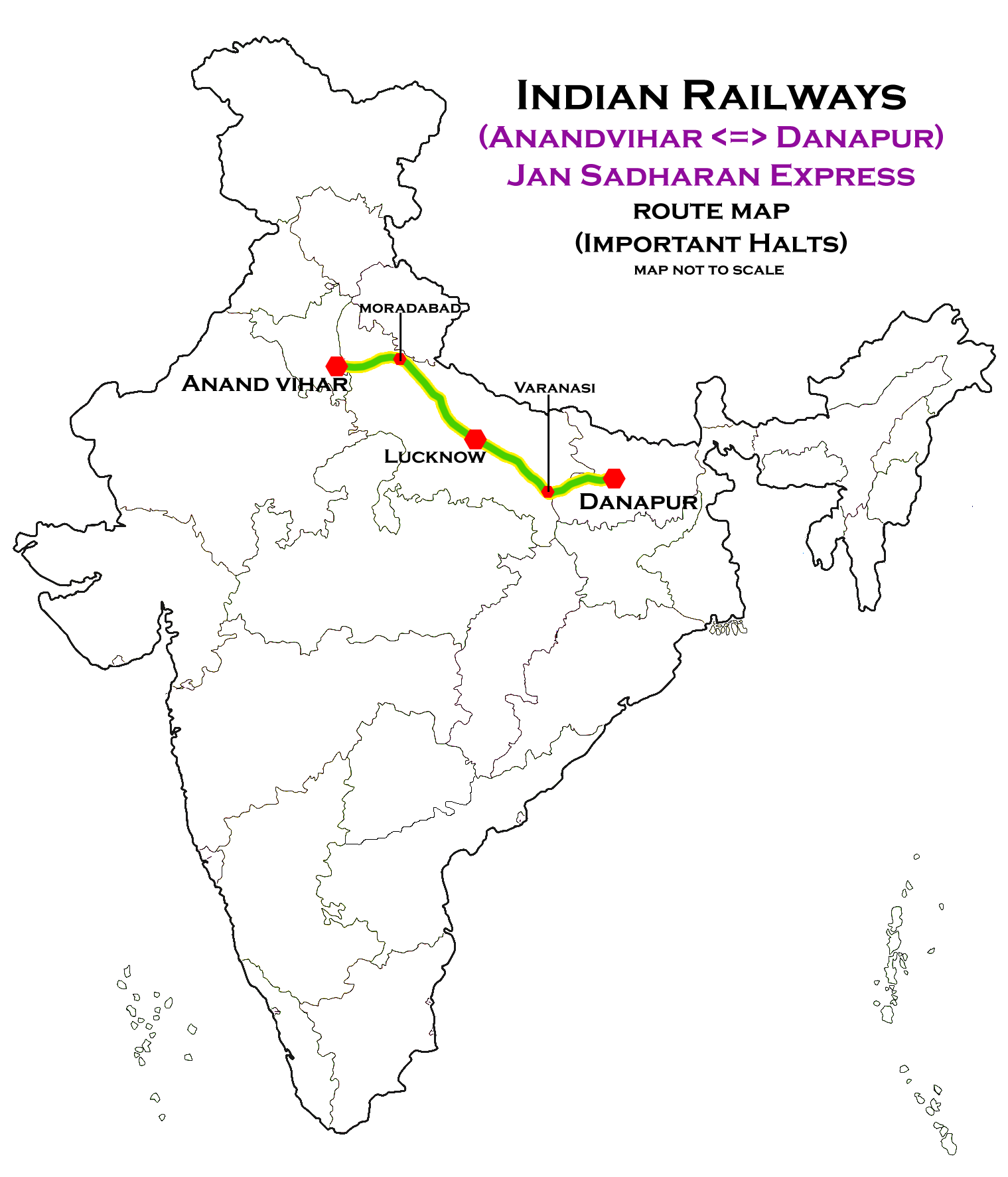

The 13257 / 13258 Danapur – Anand Vihar Terminal Jan Sadharan Express is a Superfast Express train belonging to Indian Railways – East Central Railway zone that runs between Danapur and Anand Vihar Terminal in India.

It operates as train number 13257 from Danapur to Anand Vihar Terminal and as train number 13258 in the reverse direction, serving the states of Bihar and Delhi.

It is part of the Jan Sadharan Express series launched by the former Railway Minister Nitish Kumar.

In 2019, the frequency of the train was reduced.

== Coaches ==
The 13257/58 Danapur–Anand Vihar Jan Sadharan Express has 20 General Unreserved and 2 SLR (Seating cum Luggage Rake) coaches. It does not carry a pantry car.

As is customary with most train services in India, coach composition may be amended at the discretion of Indian Railways depending on demand.

== Service ==
The 13257 Danapur–Anand Vihar Jan Sadharan Express covers the distance of 990 km (615 mi) in 18 hours 50 mins (62.53 km/h) and in 18 hours 40 mins as 13258 Anand Vihar–Danapur Jan Sadharan Express (59.40 km/h).

As the average speed of the train is above 55 km/h (34 mph), as per Indian Railways rules, its fare includes a Superfast surcharge.

== Route ==
The 13257/13258 Danapur–Anand Vihar Terminal Jan Sadharan Express runs from Danapur via Ara, Buxar, Pt. DD Upadhyay Jn., Varanasi, Lucknow Charbagh, Moradabad to Anand Vihar Terminal.

== Traction ==
As the route is fully electrified, a Gomoh / Kanpur / Ghaziabad-based WAP-7 or WAP-4 locomotive powers the train for its entire journey.

== Operation ==
- 13257 Danapur–Anand Vihar Jan Sadharan Express leaves Danapur on a daily basis arriving Anand Vihar Terminal the next day.
- 13258 Anand Vihar–Danapur Jan Sadharan Express leaves Anand Vihar Terminal on a daily basis arriving Danapur the next day.
