= Gudur–Chennai section =

Railway line in India

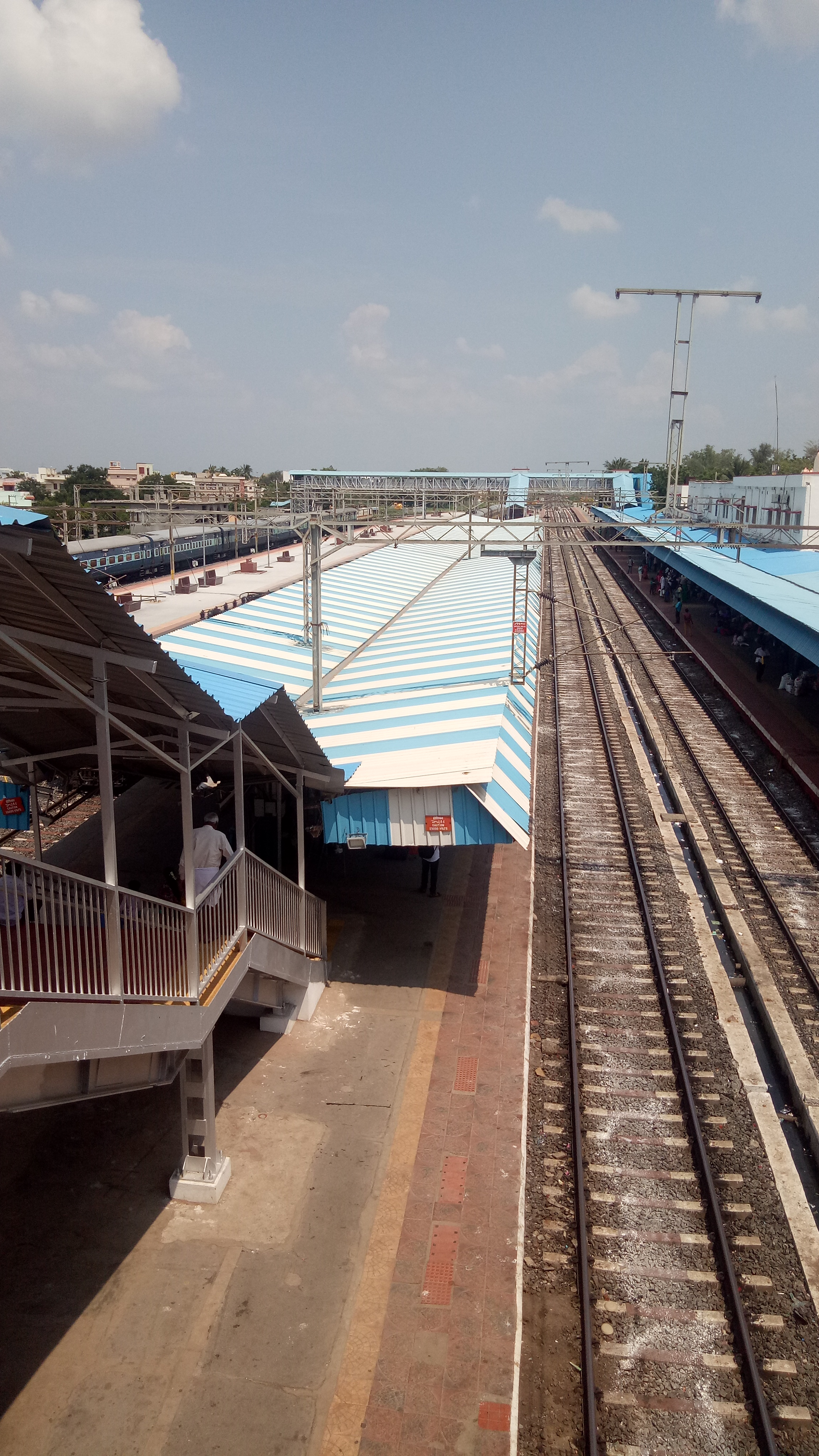
- Gudur Junction the starting point of Gudur–Chennai section

Overview
- Status: Operational
- Owner: Indian Railways
- Locale: Andhra Pradesh, Tamil Nadu
- Termini: Gudur; Chennai Central

Service
- Operator(s): South Coast Railway, Southern Railway

History
- Opened: 1899

Technical
- Track length: 455 km (283 mi)
- Number of tracks: 2
- Track gauge: 1,676 mm (5 ft 6 in) broad gauge
- Electrification: Yes
- Operating speed: 130 km/h (81 mph)

The Gudur–Chennai section is a railway line connecting Gudur in the Indian state of Andhra Pradesh and Chennai Central of Tamil Nadu. The main line is part of the Howrah–Chennai main line and New Delhi–Chennai main line.

== Jurisdiction ==
Gudur is under the administrative jurisdiction of South Coast Railway, and the rest of the line up to Chennai is under the administrative jurisdiction of Southern Railway.

Due to heavy and incessant rains from 3 to 5 November 1957, water overflowed the track at many places between Tada and Nayudupeta stations on the Madras–Gudur section of the Southern Railway resulting in the interruption of through communication from the afternoon of 4-11-1957

- The damage was caused both to the track and bridges on the Akkampet-Sullurpeta-Nayudupeta section of the Madras–Bezwada line on 4-11-1957 due to heavy rain and estimated cost of damage is about 2.5 lakhs.
- About 410 passengers on No. 16 Up Grant Trunk Express and about 500 passengers on No. 18 Up Janta Express which were scheduled to arrive at Madras on 4-11-1957 were held up at Sullurpeta and Dhoravari Chattram stations respectively.
