= Pandit Deen Dayal Upadhyaya Junction–Patna section =

Railway line in India

Patna–Mughalsarai section
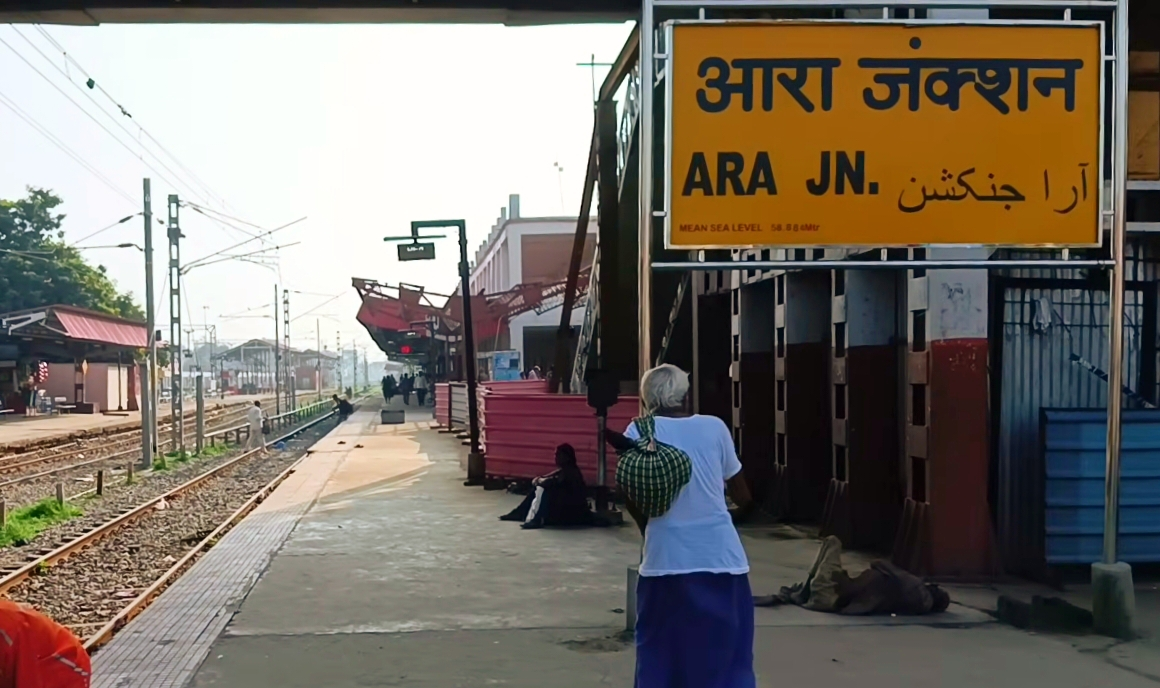
- Ara Junction railway station is an important railway station on Patna–Mughalsarai section

Overview
- Status: Operational
- Owner: Indian Railways
- Locale: Bihar, Uttar Pradesh
- Termini: Patna Junction; Pandit Deen Dayal Upadhyaya Junction

Service
- Operator: East Central Railway

History
- Opened: 1862

Technical
- Line length: 212 km (132 mi)
- Number of tracks: 2
- Track gauge: 5 ft 6 in (1,676 mm) broad gauge
- Electrification: 25 kV 50 Hz AC OHLE during 1961–1965 and 1999–2000
- Operating speed: up to 130 km/ h

The Patna–Mughalsarai section, officially Patna–Pandit Deen Dayal Upadhyaya section, is a railway line connecting Patna Junction in the Indian state of Bihar and Pt. Deen Dayal Upadhyaya Junction in Uttar Pradesh.

== History ==
The first rail track between Howrah and Delhi was via what was later named as Sahibganj loop and the first through train on the route was run in 1864. The Patna–Mughalsarai sector was ready around 1862. A "shorter main line" connecting Raniganj and Kiul was in position in 1871 and the opening of the Grand Chord in 1907 shortened the distance from Howrah to Delhi even further.

== Electrification ==
While the Mughalsarai area was electrified in 1961–65, the rest of the Patna–Mughalsarai section was electrified in 1999–2002. Sector-wise electrification was as follows: Fatuha–Danapur 1999–2000, Danapur–Dildarnagar 2001–2002, Kuchman–Dilarnagar 1999–2000.

== Speed limit ==
The entire Sitarampur–Patna–Mughalsarai line is classified as "B Class" line, where trains can run at speeds up to 130 km/h.

== Stations ==
List of important railway stations on Patna-Mughalsarai section is as follows:

- Pandit Deen Dayal Upadhyaya Junction
- Sakaldiha
- Zamania
- Dildarnagar Junction
- Gahmar
- Buxar
- Dumraon
- Bihiya
- Ara Junction
- Koilwar
- Bihta
- Neora
- Danapur
- Phulwari Sharif
- Patna Junction

== Passenger movement ==
Patna and Mughalsarai, on this line, are amongst the top hundred booking stations of Indian Railway.

== Railway reorganisation ==
In 1952, Eastern Railway, Northern Railway and North Eastern Railway were formed. Eastern Railway was formed with a portion of East Indian Railway Company, east of Mughalsarai and Bengal Nagpur Railway. Northern Railway was formed with a portion of East Indian Railway Company west of Mughalsarai, Jodhpur Railway, Bikaner Railway and Eastern Punjab Railway. North Eastern Railway was formed with Oudh and Tirhut Railway, Assam Railway and a portion of Bombay, Baroda and Central India Railway. East Central Railway was created in 1996–97.

== Trains ==
The Following trains are famously serving this route.

- Ahmedabad-Asansol Weekly Express
- Lokmanya Tilak Terminus–Kamakhya Karmabhoomi Express
- Asansol–Mumbai CSMT Superfast Express
- Sikkim Mahananda Express
- Howrah-Amritsar Mail
- Vibhuti Express
- Kamakhya-Gandhidham Express
- Dwarka Express
- Barmer–Guwahati Express
- Bikaner–Guwahati Express
- Farakka Express (via Sultanpur) & Farakka Express (via Ayodhya Cantt)
- Patna–Gomti Nagar (Lucknow) Vande Bharat Express
- Jaynagar–Udhna Antyodaya Express
- Patna-Purna Express
- Archana Express
- Himgiri Superfast Express
- Patna-Ahmedabad Weekly Express
- Shramjeevi Superfast Express
- Indore-Patna Express
- Surat-Bhagalpur Express
- Patna-Kota Express
- Brahmaputra Mail
- Patna-Mumbai CSMT Superfast Express
- Lokmanya Tilak Terminus–Dibrugarh Express
- Bhagat Ki Kothi–Kamakhya Express
- Lokmanya Tilak Terminus–Guwahati Express
- Bhagalpur–Lokmanya Tilak Terminus Superfast Express
- Godda-Mumbai LTT Superfast Express
- Vasco da Gama–Patna Superfast Express
- Poorva Express (via Patna)
- Akal Takht Express
- Gurumukhi Superfast Express
- Baba Baidyanath Dham Deoghar Humsafar Express
- Baba Baidyanath Dham Deoghar Superfast Express
- Howrah-New Delhi Duronto Express
- Ernakulam-Patna Superfast Express (via Nagpur)
- Kashi Patna Jan Shatabdi Express
- Vikramshila Express
- Magadh Express
- Malda Town–Anand Vihar Weekly Express
- Bhagalpur-Ajmer Weekly Humsafar Express
- Malda Town-New Delhi Express
- Pratham Swatrantata Sangram Express
- Ziyarat Express
- Jaynagar–Anand Vihar Garib Rath Express & Bhagalpur-Anand Vihar Terminal Garib Rath Express
- Rajendra Nagar-New Delhi Tejas Rajdhani Express
- Sampoorna Kranti Express
- Rajendra Nagar Terminal-New Delhi Amrit Bharat Express
- Patna-SMVT Bengaluru Humsafar Express
- Bhagmati Express
- Kumbh Express
- Upasana Express
- Ananya Express
- Howrah-New Delhi Rajdhani Express
- Madhupur-Anand Vihar Terminal Humsafar Express
- Agartala-Anand Vihar Terminal Tejas Rajdhani Express
- Patna-Bandra Terminus Superfast Express
- Saharsa-Bandra Terminus Humsafar Express
- Azimabad Express
- Patna Jn.–Lokmanya Tilak Terminus Janta Express

While There are also a lot of Passenger and Express trains that serves this section.

== See also ==
- Patna–Digha Ghat line
