= Pratham Swatrantata Sangram Express =

Train in India

Pratham Swatrantrata Sangram Express

Overview
- Service type: Superfast Express
- Locale: Uttar Pradesh, Bihar, Jharkhand & West Bengal
- First service: 2 December 2007; 18 years ago
- Current operator: North Central Railway

Route
- Termini: Kolkata (KOAA); Virangana Lakshmibai Jhansi Junction (VGLJ)
- Stops: 17
- Distance travelled: 1,324 km (823 mi)
- Average journey time: 23 hrs 15 mins
- Service frequency: Weekly (Note: Runs one days in a week for every direction.)
- Train number: 22197 / 22198

On-board services
- Classes: AC 2 Tier, AC 3 Tier, AC 3 Tier Economy, Sleeper Class, General Unreserved
- Seating arrangements: Yes
- Sleeping arrangements: Yes
- Catering facilities: On-board catering, E-catering Is Available at VGLJ (Jhansi), DDU (Mughalsarai), BXR, PNBE, KIUL, JAJ, JSME, MDP, ASN, BWN & KOAA.
- Observation facilities: Large windows
- Baggage facilities: No
- Other facilities: Below the seats

Technical
- Rolling stock: LHB coach
- Track gauge: 1,676 mm (5 ft 6 in)
- Operating speed: 55 km/h (34 mph) average including halts.

The 22197 / 22198 Pratham Swatrantata Sangram Express is a superfast express train belonging to North Central Railway zone that runs between Kolkata and Virangana Lakshmibai Jhansi Junction in India. It is currently being operated with 22197/98 train numbers on a weekly basis.

The train has given name in honour to the Indian Rebellion of 1857, It is also known as the Pratham Swatrantrata Sangram, or First war of Indian Independence.

== Background ==
It was first introduced between Barrackpore and Jhansi, commemorating the first independence movement of India, which started in two places by revolutionaries Mangal Pandey and Rani Laxmi Bai. Later it started departing from Kolkata Railway Station instead of Barrackpore.

== Service ==
The 22197 Pratham Swatrantrata Sangram Express has an average speed of 55 km/h and covers 1324 km in 23h 15m. The 22198 Pratham Swatrantrata Sangram Express has an average speed of 55 km/h and covers 1324 km in 23h 15m. The train has LHB coach. AC three tier, sleeper and general classes are available in it; it has no Pantry car service, but Tatkal scheme is available. All the classes except general require prior reservations.

== Stops ==
1. Kolkata
2. Naihati Jn. (Barrackpore until 2021)
3. Barddhaman Jn.
4. Asansol Jn.
5. Chittaranjan
6. Madhupur Jn.
7. Jasidih Jn.
8. Jhajha
9. Kiul Jn.
10. Patna Jn.
11. Ara Jn.
12. Buxar
13. Pt. Deen Dayal Upadhyaya (Mughalsarai) Jn.
14. Prayagraj (Allahabad) Jn.
15. Govindpuri
16. Orai
17. Virangana Lakshmibai Jhansi Jn.

=== Important stopping points ===
1. Kolkata
2. Naihati Jn. (Barrackpore until 2021)
3. Barddhaman Jn.
4. Asansol Jn.
5. Jhajha
6. Patna Jn.
7. Pt. Deen Dayal Upadhyaya (Mughalsarai) Jn.
8. Prayagraj (Allahabad) Jn.
9. Kanpur Central
10. Virangana Lakshmibai Jhansi Jn.

== RSA - Rake Sharing ==
The train shares its rakes with 22195/96 Virangana Lakshmibai Jhansi-Bandra Terminus SF Express.

Train No.	Train name	Departs	Arrival
22195	VGL Jhansi-Bandra Terminus Express	VGLJ@04:50 PM MON	BDTS@04:10 PM TUE
22196	Bandra Terminus-VGL Jhansi Express	BDTS@05:10 AM WED	VGLJ@05:00 AM THU
22198	Pratham Swatantrata Sangram Express	VGLJ@09:20 PM FRI	KOAA@08:35 PM SAT
22197	Pratham Swatantrata Sangram Express	KOAA@07:25 AM SUN	VGLJ@07:20 AM MON

=== Schedule ===
Train Number	Departure Station Code	Departure Station Name	Departure Time	Departure Day	Arrival Station Code	Arrival Station Name	Arrival Time	Arrival Day
22197	KOAA	Kolkata	7:25 AM	Sunday	VGLJ	Virangana Lakshmibai Jhansi Junction	7:20 AM	Monday
22198	VGLJ	Virangana Lakshmibai Jhansi Junction	9:20 PM	Friday	KOAA	Kolkata	8:35 PM	Saturday

It leaves Kolkata Railway Station at 7:25 every Sunday, and reaches Virangana Lakshmibai Jhansi Junction at 7:20 the following morning; it departs Virangana Lakshmibai Jhansi Junction at 21:20 on Fridays and reaches Kolkata Railway station at 20:35 the following evening.

== Traction ==
The trains is previously hauled by WAM-4 electric locomotive for the entire route.

Both train are hauled by a Kanpur Loco Shed based WAP-7 electric locomotive from Kolkata to VGL Jhansi Junction.

== See also ==
- Kolkata railway station
- Virangana Lakshmibai Jhansi Junction railway station
