= Buxar railway station =

Railway station in Buxar, Bihar, India

BUXAR

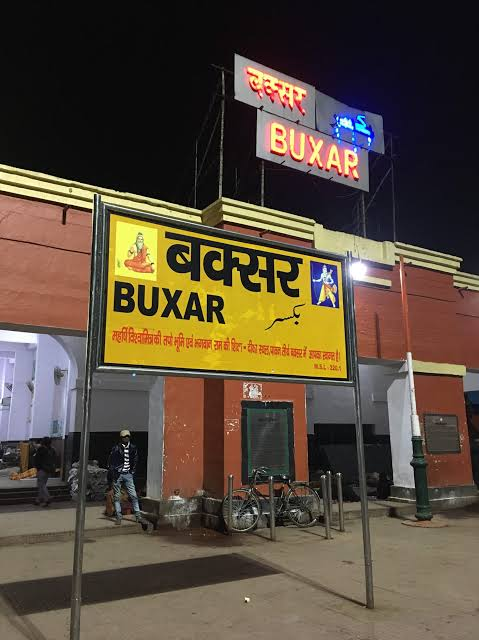
- Entrance view of Buxar railway station

General information
- Location: Station Road, Buxar, Bihar; India
- Coordinates: 25.5612°N 83.9810°E
- Elevation: 67 metres (220 ft)
- System: Indian Railway station
- Owner: Indian Railways
- Operator: East Central Railway
- Lines: Howrah–Delhi main line (Patna–Mughalsarai section)
- Platforms: 3
- Tracks: 8
- Connections: Auto stand (private)

Construction
- Structure type: Standard (on-ground station)
- Parking: Yes
- Cycle facilities: No
- Accessible: Disabled access

Other information
- Status: Functioning
- Station code: BXR
- Zone(s): East Central Railway
- Division(s): Danapur

History
- Opened: 1862
- Electrified: 1999–2002
Route map
- Source: Google maps 13039 Howrah–Delhi Janata Express
Location
- Location within India Location within Bihar

Buxar railway station (station code: BXR) is a railway station in Buxar district in the Indian state of Bihar. It serves Buxar city. The station consists of 3 platforms. Buxar is connected to the state capital Patna by rail routes and there are direct trains from Buxar to the metro cities of India like Bangalore, Delhi, Jaipur, Kolkata, Ahmedabad, Chennai, Pune, Surat, Hydrerabad, Guwahati and Mumbai.secundrabad, howrah, jammu tawi, chandigarh, yeshwantpur, nagpur, Ajmer, Lucknow, Prayagraj Junction railway station

On the enquiry section of Buxar railway station, there is only one counter. There is artwork done in the waiting hall near entrance of the railway station gives a classy look. In the year 2019, Buxar railway station has been renovated very fast. A new overbridge has been associated with a lift system along with escalator installed within. The station lacks basic facilities, such as parking, drinking water, lights, shedding.

== Trains ==
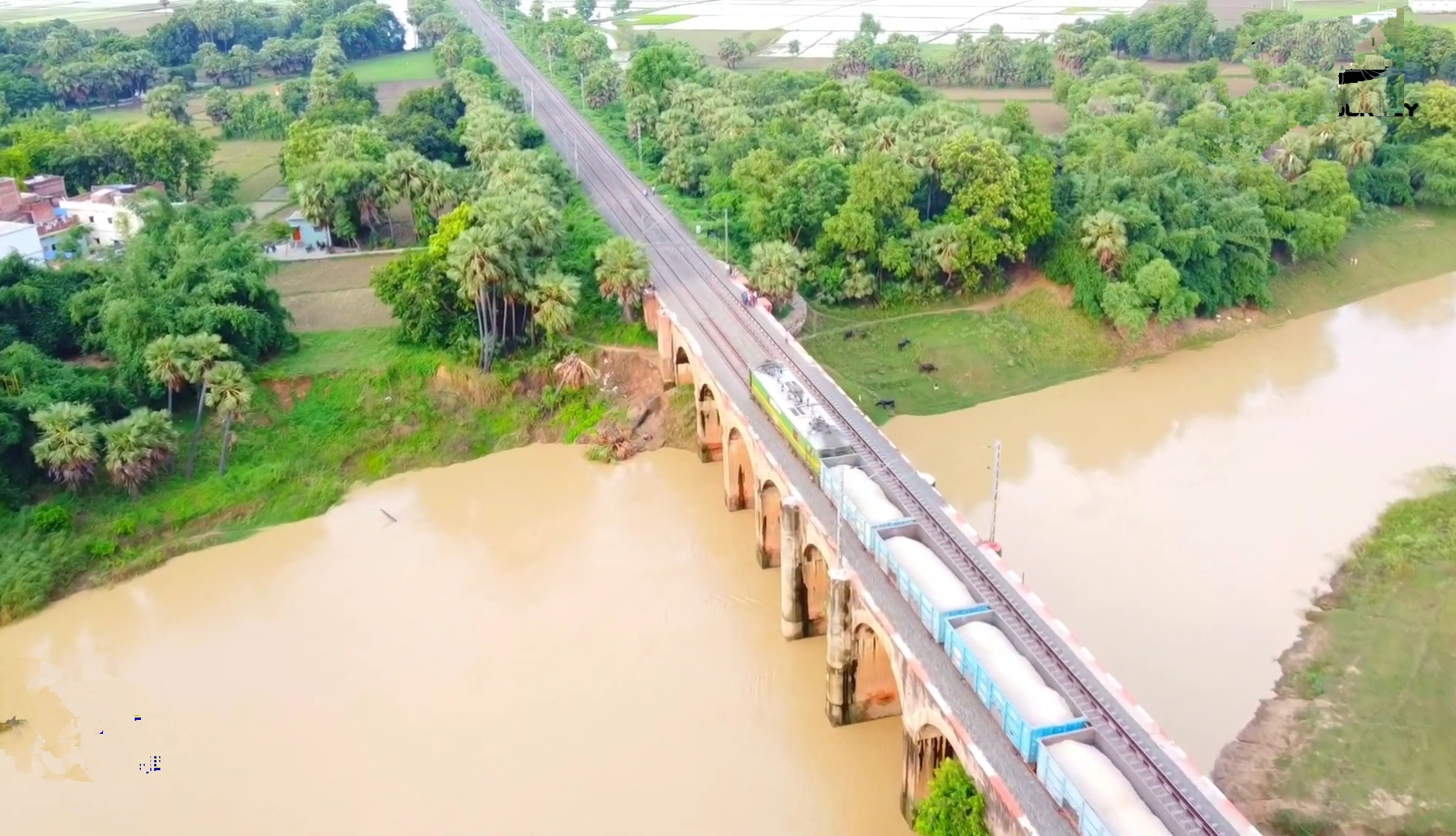
Freight train passing thora bridge near buxar station

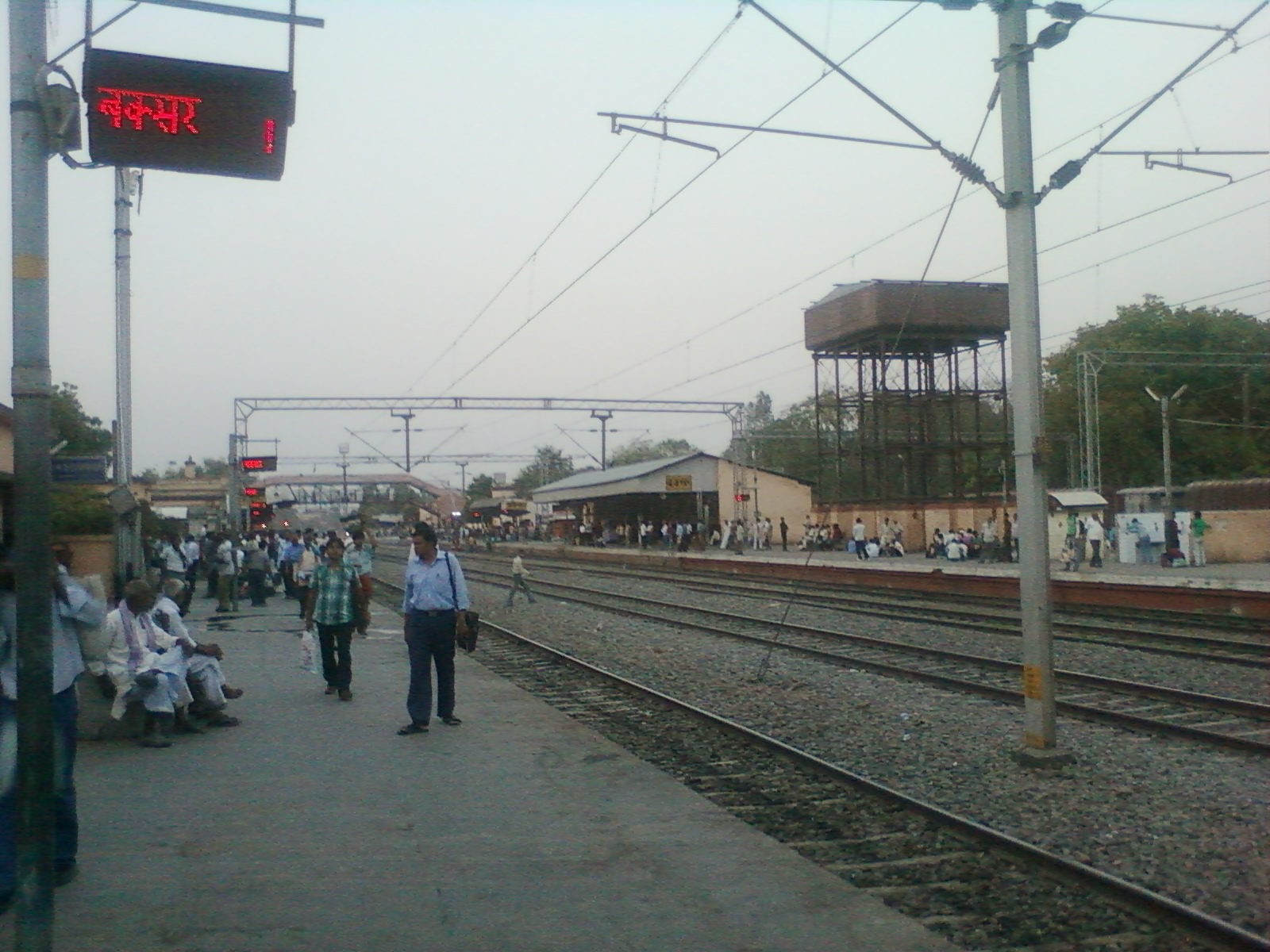
View from one of the platforms

Several major trains that halt at Buxar station:

Train no.	Name
12141 / 12142	Lokmanya Tilak Terminus–Patliputra Express
12303 / 12304	Poorva Express (via Patna)
12295 / 12296	Sanghamithra Express
16359 / 16360	Ernakulam–Patna Express (via Tirupati)
15955 / 15956	Brahmaputra Mail
12435 / 12436	Jaynagar–Anand Vihar Garib Rath Express
22405 / 22406	Bhagalpur–Anand Vihar Terminal Garib Rath Express
12791 / 12792	Secunderabad–Danapur Express
12391 / 12392	Shramjeevi Superfast Express
12947 / 12948	Azimabad Express
12505 / 12506	North East Express
20801 / 20802	Magadh Express
12327 / 12328	Upasana Express
12369 / 12370	Kumbha Express
12577 / 12578	Bhagmati Express
12741 / 12742	Vasco da Gama–Patna Superfast Express
12331 / 12332	Himgiri Superfast Express
15563 / 15564	Jaynagar–Udhna Antyodaya Express
12335 / 12336	Bhagalpur–Lokmanya Tilak Terminus Superfast Express
12361 / 12362	Asansol–Mumbai CSMT Superfast Express
12149 / 12150	Pune–Danapur Superfast Express
12333 / 12334	Vibhuti Express

22345/22346 patna - gomti nagar (Lucknow) vande bharat express

12367/ 12368 vikramshila superfast express

12395/ 12396 ziyarat superfast express
