= Poorva Express =

Train in India

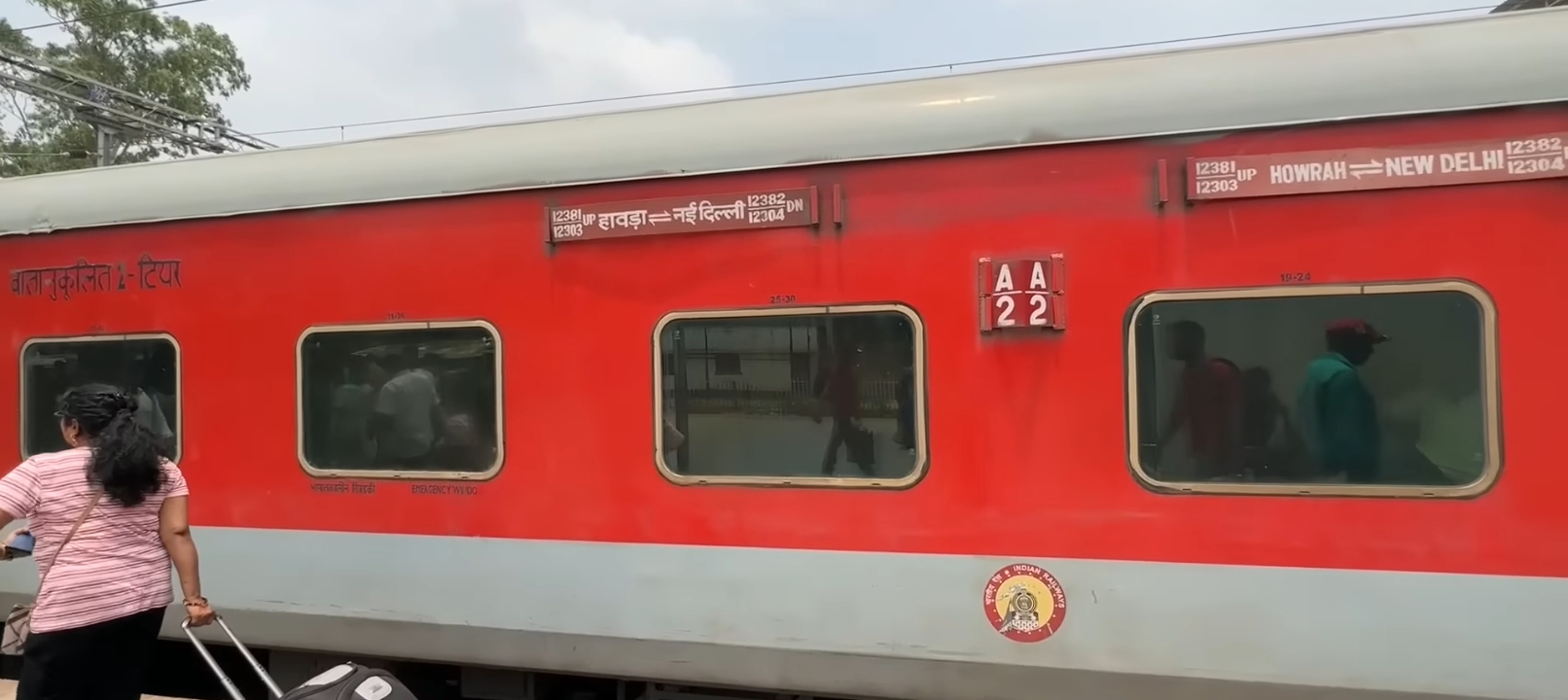
- Poorva Express At Jasidih

Overview
- Service type: Superfast Express
- Locale: Delhi, Uttar Pradesh, Bihar, Jharkhand & West Bengal
- First service: 1 October 1956; 70 years ago (via Gaya); 2 October 1956; 70 years ago (via Patna)
- Current operator: Eastern Railway

Route
- Termini: Howrah (HWH); Shakur Basti (SSB)
- Stops: 21 (via Gaya); 24 (via Patna)
- Distance travelled: 1,452 km (902 mi) (via Gaya); 1,531 km (951 mi) (via Patna)
- Average journey time: 21 hours 45 minutes (via Gaya); 23 hours 20 minutes (via Patna)
- Service frequency: Tri-weekly (via Gaya); Four days a week (via Patna)
- Train numbers: 12381/12382 (via Gaya); 12303/12304 (via Patna)

On-board services
- Classes: AC First Class, AC 2 Tier, AC 3 Tier, Sleeper Class, General Unreserved
- Seating arrangements: Yes
- Sleeping arrangements: Yes
- Catering facilities: Available
- Observation facilities: Large Windows
- Baggage facilities: Available
- Other facilities: Below the seats

Technical
- Rolling stock: LHB coach
- Track gauge: 1,676 mm (5 ft 6 in)
- Operating speed: 66 km/h (41 mph) average including halts.

The 12381/12382 & 12303/12304 Poorva Express is a superfast express trains of Indian Railways running between Howrah Junction in West Bengal to Shakur Basti in Delhi. The name Poorva signifies the eastern part of India, and the train is mainly attracts travellers from Bihar, Jharkhand, and West Bengal states.

== History ==
Prior to the introduction of the Rajdhani Express, the Deluxe Express was the premium category superfast trains of India. Fully air conditioned and superfast, they were given the highest priority in Indian Railways. There were two of them. One use to ply between Amritsar and Bandra Terminus, and another from Amritsar to Howrah. Both of them use to carry the ICF Rajdhani liveried coaches. Later with due course of time the Deluxe Express till Bandra was renamed as Paschim Express while the Deluxe Express till Howrah was renamed as Poorva Express. The Poorva Express was launched on the 2nd of October, 1956 and ran as the first fully air conditioned train of India.

With due course of time, the "fully Air Conditioned" was stripped off from its name to accommodate additional Non-AC sleeper Coaches and was subsequently terminated till New Delhi. And with the launch of Howrah Rajdhani Express, it lost its grandeur and subsequently its priority. It was relegated to Maroon-cream coloured Coaches with no tubelights only bulbs inside the coach first and then to Standard Blue ICF Coaches with tubelights inside the coach. But later getting refurbished to LHB coach in April 2013, gave this train next level security and accommodation.

Though it suffered with time, its popularity never ceased. Due to its huge demand, Indian Railways introduced a second pair of Poorva Express on 1 August 1971 via Patna. Not only that, during its peak time it was one of the longest trains with a load of 24 coaches and was used to be hauled by twin WDM-2 engines between Mughalsarai and Chittaranjan.

== Service ==
The 12381 Poorva Express has an average speed of 66.62 km/h with halt and covers 1449 km in 21h 45m. The 12382 Poorva Express has an average speed of 62.2 km/h with halt and covers 1449 km in 23h 20m.

== Route and halts ==
Route and halts of Poorva Express (via Patna)

- Howrah Junction
- Bardhaman
- Durgapur
- Asansol Junction
- Chittaranjan
- Madhupur
- Jamtara
- Jasidih
- Jhajha
- Jamui
- Kiul
- Mokama
- Barh
- Bakhtiyarpur
- Patna Junction
- Danapur
- Ara Junction
- Buxar
- Pt. Deen Dayal Upadhayaya Junction
- Prayagraj Junction
- Kanpur Central
- Etawah
- Tundla
- Aligarh Junction
- New Delhi
- Shakur Basti

Route and halts of Poorva Express (Via Gaya)

- Howrah Junction
- Barddhaman Junction
- Durgapur
- Asansol Junction
- Dhanbad Junction
- Parasnath
- Koderma Junction
- Gaya Junction
- RafiGanj
- Anugraha Narayan Road
- Dehri-on-Sone
- Sasaram Junction
- Bhabua Road
- Pt. Deen Dayal Upadhyaya Junction
- Varanasi Junction
- Janghai
- Prayagraj Junction
- Kanpur Central
- Etawah Junction
- Tundla Junction
- Aligarh Junction
- New Delhi
- Shakur Basti

== Coach composition ==
The train has standard LHB rakes with a max speed of 130 km/h. The train consists of 22 coaches:

- 1HA (1st AC cum 2A)
- 2 AC II Tier
- 5 AC III Tier
- 7 Sleeper Coaches
- 1 Pantry Car
- 4 General Unreserved
- 2 HOG

Loco	1	2	3	4	5	6	7	8	9	10	11	12	13	14	15	16	17	18	19	20	21	22
	EOG	GS	GS	S1	S2	S3	S4	S5	S6	S7	PC	HA1	A1	A2	B1	B2	B3	B4	B5	GS	GS	EOG

== Traction ==
Earlier both Poorva Express has been pulled by WDM-2 and WDM-3A or WDP-4B respectively. But as of now both trains are regularly hauled by a Howrah Loco Shed-based WAP-5 / WAP-7 electric locomotives on its entire journey.

== Rake sharing ==
Both Poorva Express shares its rakes with each other.

=== Train detail ===
Detail of Poorva Express
Pair	Train No.	Sector	Departure	Arrival	Frequency	Average Speed	Stops	Distance
1	12303	Howrah – Shakur Basti Via Patna	08:00	06:00	Mon, Tue, Fri, Sat	70 km	BWN, DGR, ASN, CRJ, MDP, JSME, JAJ, JMU, KIUL, MKA, BARH, BKP, PNBE, DNR, ARA, BXR, DDU, ALD, CNB, ETW, TDL, ALJN	1531 km
1	12304	Shakur Basti – Howrah Via Patna	17:40	17:00	Wed, Thu, Sat, Sun	65 km	BWN, DGR, ASN, CRJ, MDP, JSME, JAJ, JMU, KIUL, MKA, BARH, BKP, PNBE, DNR, ARA, BXR, DDU, ALD, CNB, ETW, TDL, ALJN	1531 km
2	12381	Howrah – Shakur Basti Via Gaya	08:15	06:00	Sun, Wed, Thu	67 km	ALJN, TDL, ETW, CNB, ALD, BSB, DDU, BBU, SSM, DOS, ABUR, RFG, GAYA, KQR, PNME, DHN, ASN, DGR, BWN	1449 km
2	12382	Shakur Basti – Howrah Via Gaya	17:40	17:00	Mon, Tue, Fri	62 km	ALJN, TDL, ETW, CNB, ALD, BSB, DDU, BBU, SSM, DOS, ABUR, RFG, GAYA, KQR, PNME, DHN, ASN, DGR, BWN	1449 km

== Accidents and incidents ==
On 14 December 2014 the 12381 UP Howrah - New Delhi Poorva Express derailed at 8.27 am after leaving Howrah at 8.15 am. 11 sleeper coaches and a pantry car (AC Hot Buffet Car) of the New Delhi-bound Poorva Express derailed at Liluah shortly after leaving Howrah station. There were no casualties or injuries to any passengers, railway officials said. The train was moving at a slow speed when it derailed, the officials said, adding that the reasons for the mishap were being examined. What saved the passengers was the speed of the train. "The Poorva Express was moving at 10 to 15 km/h when the accident occurred. The average speed of the train is 63 km/h, though it can travel at 120 km/h. Derailment at higher speeds would have been catastrophic," an official said.

The 12381 Howrah - New Delhi Poorva Express via Gaya, which left from Howrah on 19 April 2019 got derailed at Ruma Railway Station, near Kanpur in Uttar Pradesh. At least 15 people were injured in this accident. As per PRO Kanpur Division, due to the modern LHB coach, something serious didn't happen. Commissioner of Railway Safety (CRS) of Indian Railways ordered a panel for enquiry in this accident.

== Gallery ==
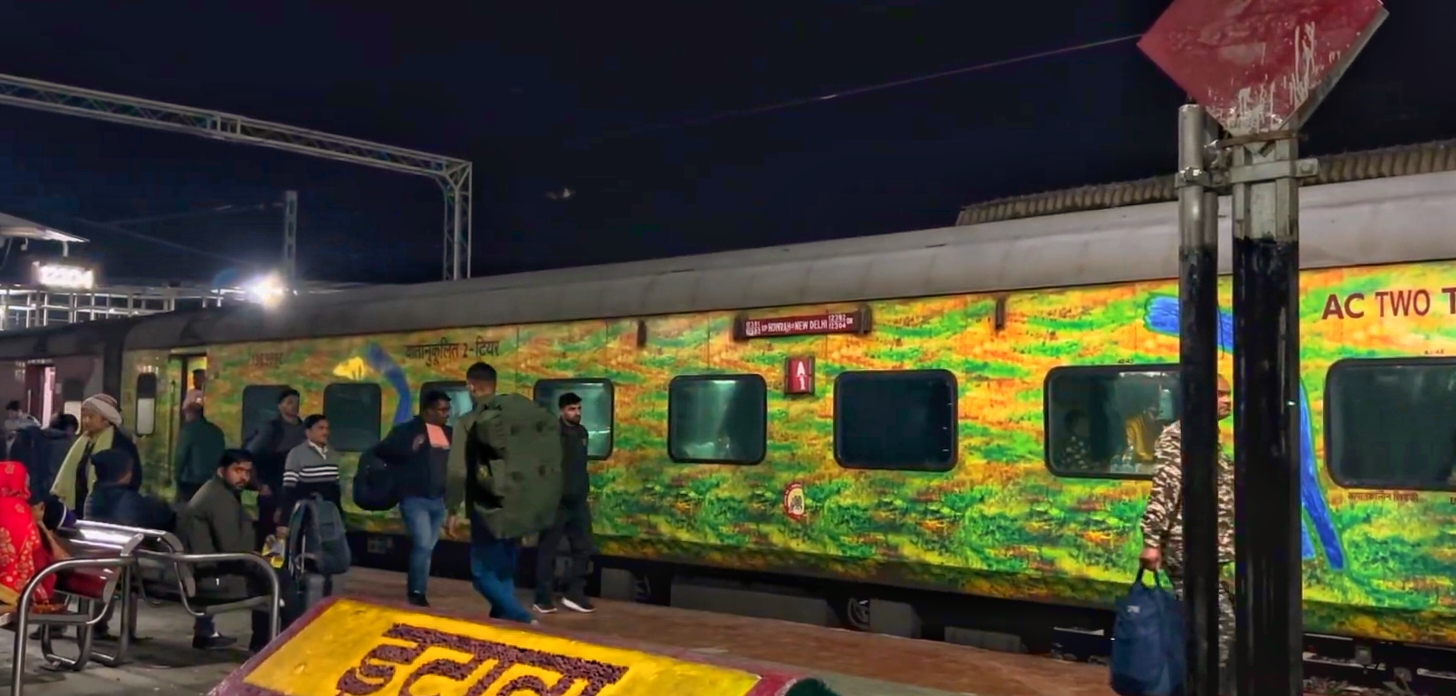
Poorva Express (via Gaya) at Etawah

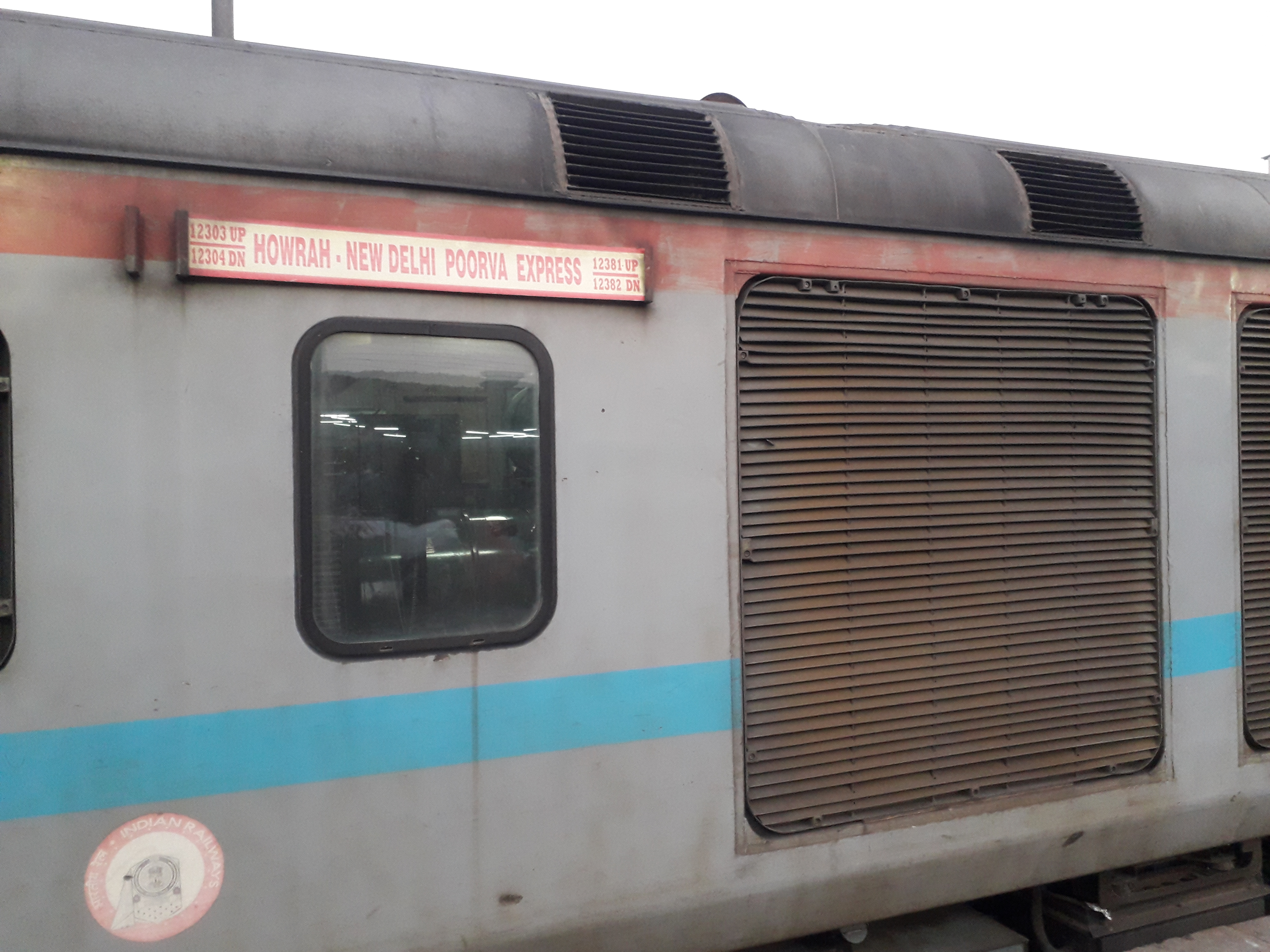
12304 Poorva Express - EOG

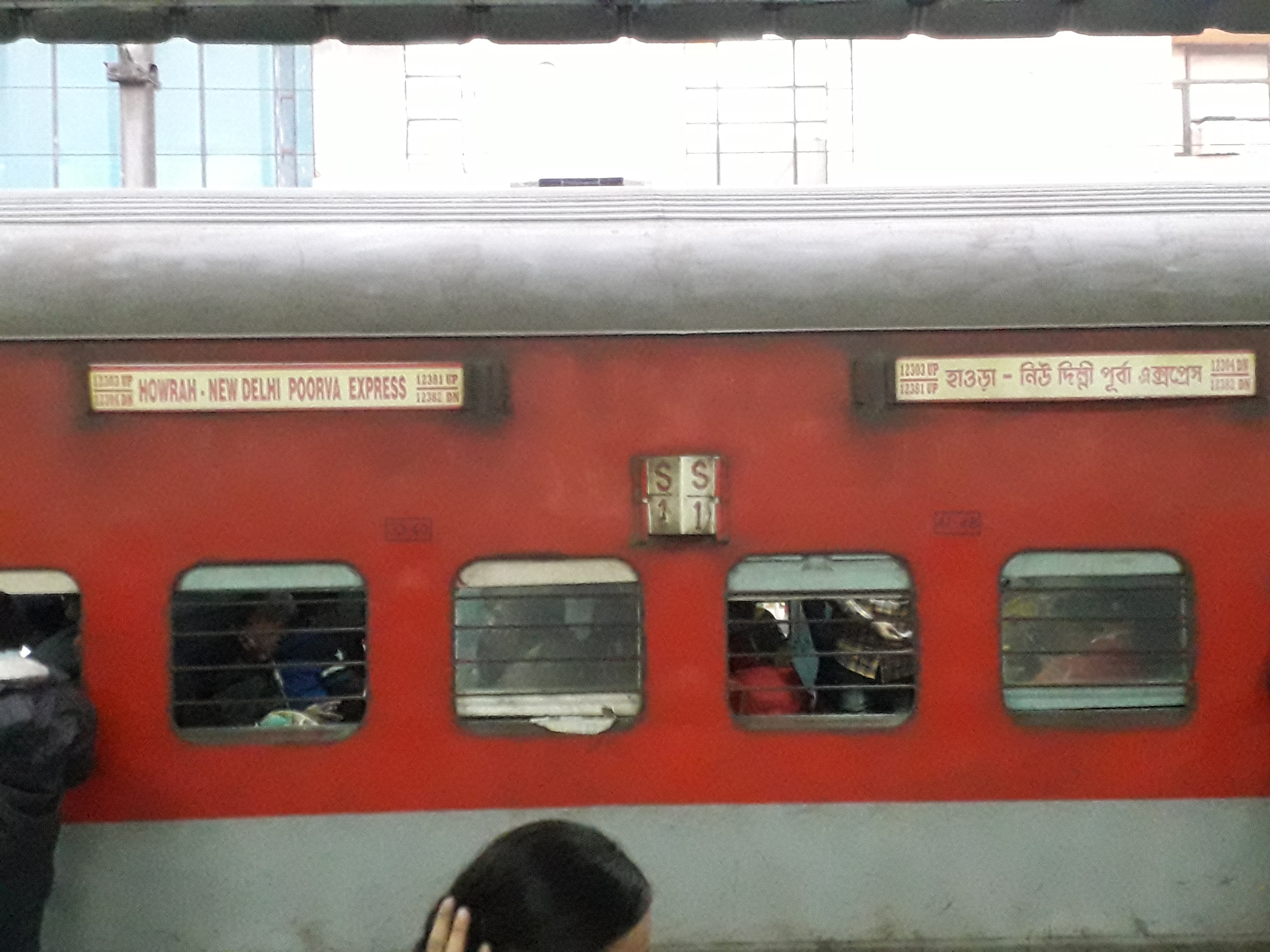
12304 Poorva Express - Sleeper Class coach

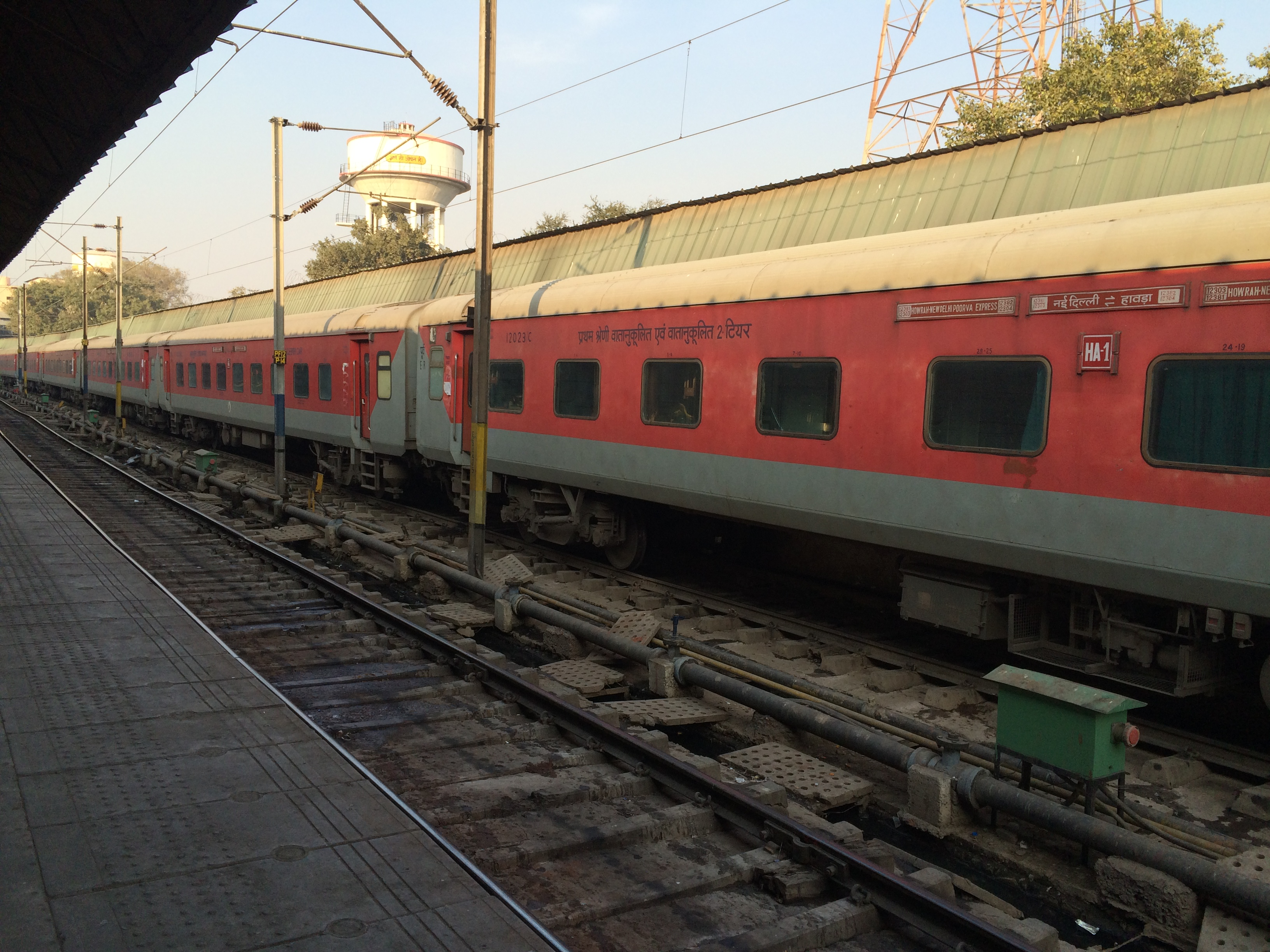
Poorva Express at New Delhi

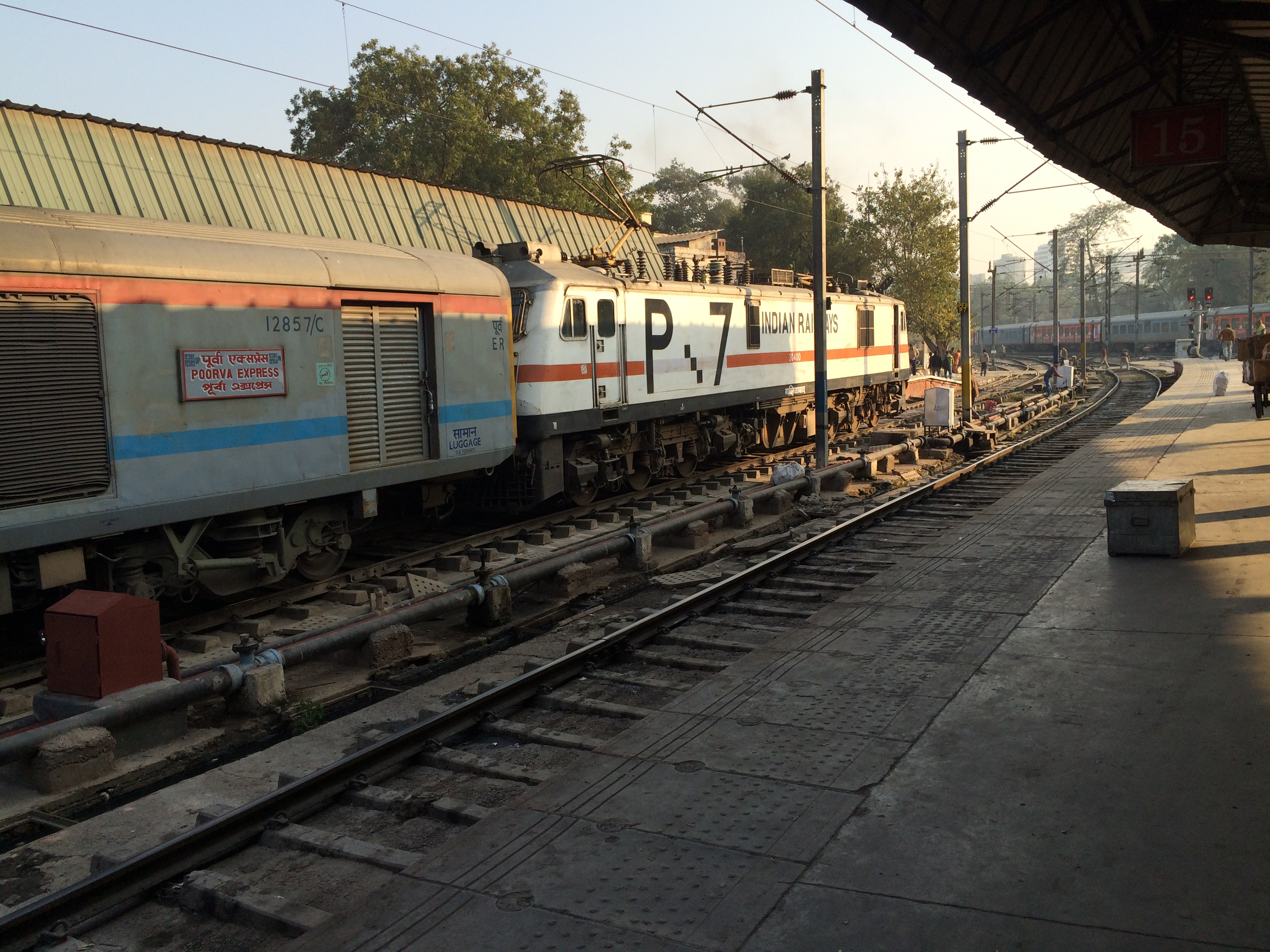
Poorva Express at New Delhi with a Ghaziabad based WAP 7

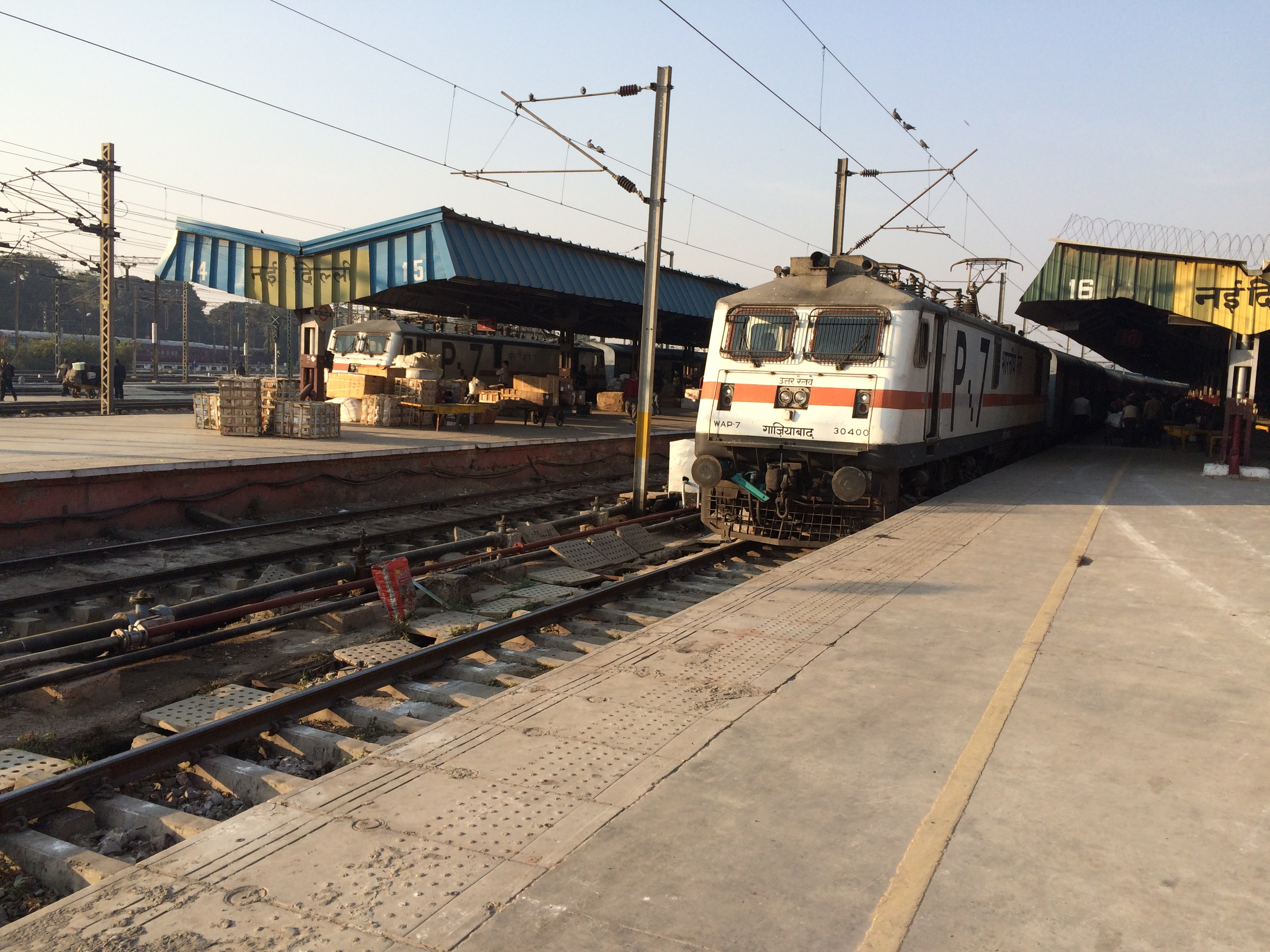
Ghaziabad based WAP 7 ready to haul the Poorva Express

== See also ==
- Shakur Basti railway station
- Howrah Junction railway station
