= Jamtara railway station =

Railway station in Jharkhand, India

JAMTARA

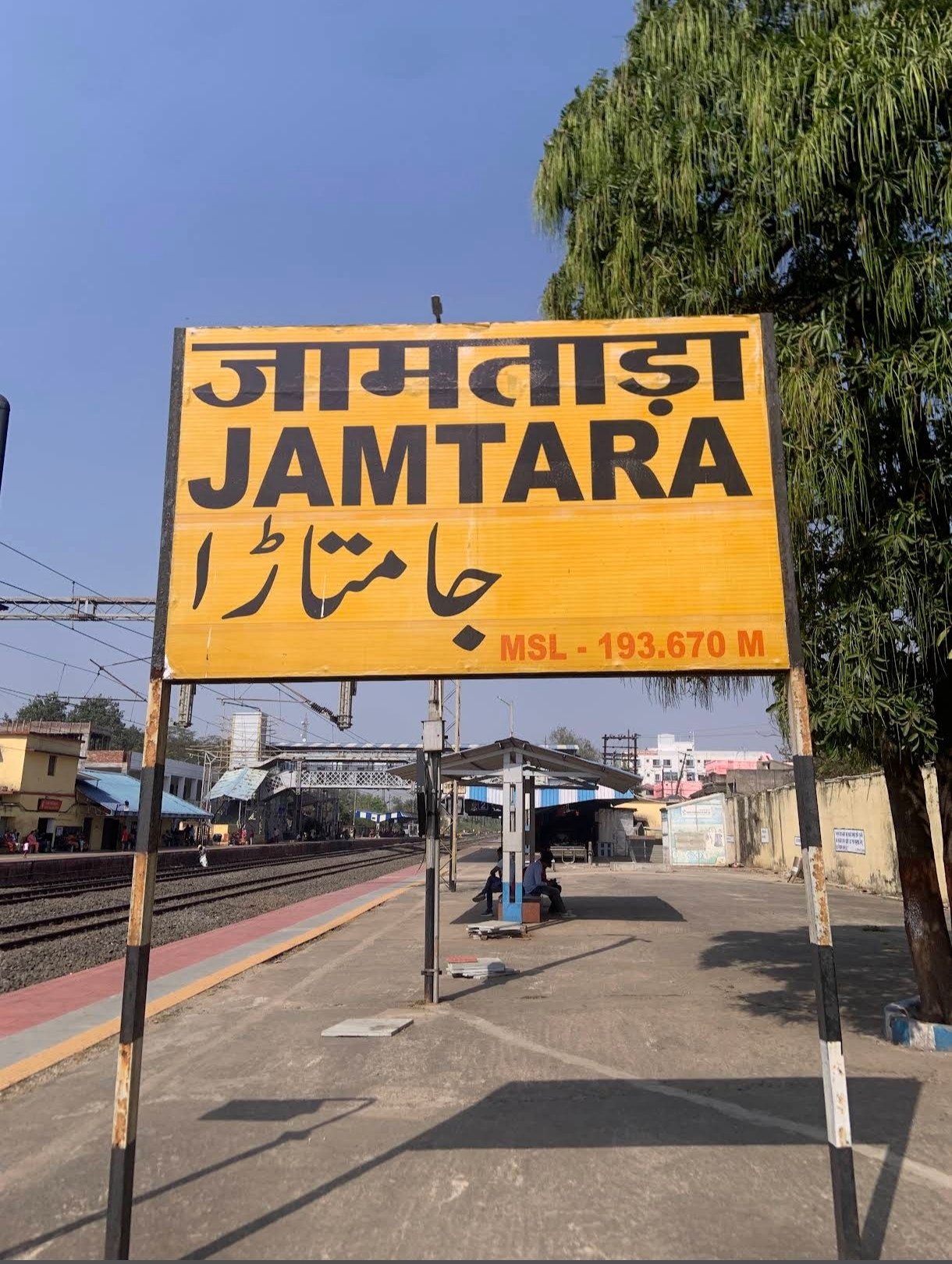

General information
- Location: Station Road, Jamtara, Jharkhand; India
- Coordinates: 23.95935°N 86.80584°E
- Elevation: 193 metres (633 ft)
- System: Indian Railways station
- Owner: Indian Railways
- Operator: Eastern Railway
- Line: Howrah–Delhi main line
- Platforms: 2
- Tracks: Broad gauge
- Connections: Auto stand, Bus stand

Construction
- Structure type: At grade
- Parking: Available
- Accessible: Available

Other information
- Status: Active
- Station code: JMT
- Zone(s): Eastern Railway
- Division(s): Asansol
- Classification: NSG-5

History
- Electrified: 1996–97
- Former names: East Indian Railway
Route map
Location
- Location within Jharkhand Location within India
- Interactive map of Jamtara

Jamtara railway station (station code: JMT) is a railway station located in Jamtara district in the Indian state of Jharkhand. It lies on the Howrah–Delhi main line under the Asansol railway division of the Eastern Railway zone. The station serves the city of Jamtara and nearby areas. It is an important stop for express and passenger trains, including the Patna–Howrah Vande Bharat Express. The station is being developed under the Amrit Bharat Station Scheme and construction work is currently in progress.

== Facilities ==
Since the station is classified as an NSG-5 category station, it is equipped with basic passenger amenities such as a waiting room, food stalls, computerized reservation counter (PRS), free RailWire WiFi, drinking water facility, washrooms, public toilets, a foot overbridge, and an ATM for cash withdrawal.

Jamtara has 2 platforms, connected with a foot overbridge for passenger convenience. The platforms cater to both up and down route trains on the Howrah-Delhi main line, serving the passengers.

The station is also undergoing an upgradation process under the Amrit Bharat Station Scheme, which is currently under construction. Upon completion, the station is planned to have an executive lounge for passengers, escalators, elevators, and an enlarged station building with modern facilities to accommodate a higher passenger capacity.

== Trains ==
Both express and suburban trains halt at Jamtara railway station, which is on the route of Asansol–Patna section of the Howrah–Delhi main line. The station is also a stoppage for newly introduced services such as the Patna–Howrah Vande Bharat Express.

== Nearest airports ==
- Deoghar Airport, Jharkhand – 76 kilometres (47 mi)
- Kazi Nazrul Islam Airport, Durgapur – 75 kilometres (47 mi)
- Birsa Munda Airport, Ranchi – 208 kilometres (129 mi)
- Netaji Subhash Chandra Bose International Airport, Kolkata – 247 kilometres (153 mi)

== See also ==
- Asansol railway division
- Eastern Railway zone
- Howrah–Delhi main line
- Asansol–Patna section
