= Upasana Express =

Train in India

Overview
- Service type: Express
- First service: 14 April 2000; 26 years ago
- Current operator: Eastern Railway

Route
- Termini: Howrah (HWH); Dehradun (DDN)
- Stops: 20
- Distance travelled: 1,589 km (987 mi)
- Average journey time: 29 hours 10 minutes
- Service frequency: Bi-weekly
- Train number: 13035 / 13036

On-board services
- Classes: AC First Class, AC 2 tier, AC 3 tier, Sleeper class, General Unreserved
- Seating arrangements: Yes
- Sleeping arrangements: Yes
- Catering facilities: Available
- Observation facilities: Rake sharing with 13037/13038 Kumbh Express
- Baggage facilities: Available
- Other facilities: Below the seats

Technical
- Rolling stock: LHB coach
- Track gauge: 1,676 mm (5 ft 6 in)
- Operating speed: 130 km/h (81 mph) maximum, 55 km/h (34 mph) average including halts.

The 13035 / 13036 Upasana Express is a Superfast Express train belonging to Indian Railways – Eastern Railway zone that runs between Howrah Junction and Dehradun in India.

It operates as train number 13035 from Howrah Junction to Dehradun and as train number 13036 in the reverse direction, serving the states of West Bengal, Jharkhand, Bihar, Uttar Pradesh and Uttarakhand and is a train that connect Howrah & Dehradun, the other train being the 13037/13038 Kumbha Express.

== Coaches ==
Earlier the Upasana Express used to run with ICF rake, and now The 13035/13036 Upasana Express presently has 1 AC First Class, 2 AC 2 tier, 2 AC 3 tier, 2 AC Three Economy Coaches, 2 Sleeper class car, 4 General Unreserved, 1 SLR (Seating cum Luggage Rake) and 1 EOG (End on Generator) coaches. It has a pantry car.

As is customary with most train services in India, coach composition may be amended at the discretion of Indian Railways depending on demand.

== Service ==
The 13035 Upasana Express covers the distance of 1589 kilometres in 29hours 10 mins (54 km/h) and 29 hours 30 mins as 13036 Upasana Express (54 km/h).

== Routeing ==
The 13035/13036 Upasana Express runs from Howrah via Asansol, Madhupur Junction, Jasidih, Jhajha, Kiul, Mokama Junction, Patna Junction, Ara Junction, Buxar, Dildarnagar, Mughalsarai Junction, Varanasi Junction, Sultanpur, Lucknow Charbagh, Bareilly, Moradabad, Haridwar to Dehradun.

== Traction ==
Before electrification of the route was fully complete this train was hauled by WAP-4. As the route is fully electrified, it is hauled by a Howrah Loco Shed-based WAP-5 / WAP-7 electric locomotive from Howrah to Dehradun and vice versa.

== Timings ==
- 13035 Upasana Express leaves Howrah every Tuesday and Friday at 13:00 hrs IST and reaches Dehradun at 18:10 hrs IST on Wednesday & Saturday.
- 13036 Upasana Express leaves Dehradun every Wednesday and Saturday at 21:45 hrs IST and reaches Howrah at 03:15 hrs on IST Friday & Monday.

== Rake sharing ==
The train shares its rake with 13035/13036 Kumbh Express.
