= Patna–Howrah Vande Bharat Express =

Vande Bharat Express train route in India

Patna Junction - Howrah Junction Vande Bharat Express

Overview
- Service type: Vande Bharat Express
- Locale: Bihar, Jharkhand and West Bengal
- First service: 24 September 2023 (Inaugural run); 26 September 2023; 3 years ago (Commercial Run)
- Current operator: East Central Railways (ECR)

Route
- Termini: Patna Junction (PNBE); Howrah Junction (HWH)
- Stops: 9
- Distance travelled: 532 km (331 mi)
- Average journey time: 06 hrs 35 mins
- Service frequency: Six days a week (Note: Except Wednesdays)
- Train number: 22348 / 22347
- Lines used: Asansol–Patna section; Bardhaman–Asansol section; Howrah–Bardhaman chord

On-board services
- Classes: AC Chair Car, AC Executive Chair Car
- Seating arrangements: Airline style; Rotatable seats
- Sleeping arrangements: No
- Catering facilities: On board Catering
- Observation facilities: Large windows in all coaches
- Entertainment facilities: On-board WiFi; Infotainment System; Electric outlets; Reading light; Seat Pockets; Bottle Holder; Tray Table
- Baggage facilities: Overhead racks
- Other facilities: Kavach

Technical
- Rolling stock: Mini Vande Bharat 2.0 (Last service: Feb 11 2025); Vande Bharat 2.0 (First service: Feb 13 2025) Vande Bharat 3.0 (First service: July 11 2025)
- Track gauge: Indian gauge 1,676 mm (5 ft 6 in) broad gauge
- Electrification: 25 kV 50 Hz AC Overhead line
- Operating speed: 81 km/h (50 mph) (Avg.)
- Average length: 480 metres (1,570 ft) (20 coaches)
- Track owner: Indian Railways
- Rake maintenance: Rajendra Nagar Coaching Complex (RNCC)

The 22348/22347 Patna–Howrah Vande Bharat Express is India's 30th Vande Bharat Express train, connecting the city of Patna in Bihar with Howrah in West Bengal. This train was inaugurated on 24 September 2023 by Prime Minister Narendra Modi via video conference from New Delhi.

== Overview ==
This train is operated by Indian Railways, connecting Patna Jn, Patna Sahib, Bakhtiyarpur Jn, Mokama Jn, Lakhisarai Jn, Jamui, Jasidih Jn, Jamtara, Asansol Jn, Durgapur and Howrah Jn. It is currently operated with train numbers 22348/22347 on 6 days a week basis.

== Rakes ==
It was the twenty-eighth 2nd Generation and sixteenth Mini Vande Bharat 2.0 Express train which was designed and manufactured by the Integral Coach Factory at Perambur, Chennai under the Make in India Initiative. It was later swapped with the orange liveried rakes of Patna–Gomti Nagar (Lucknow) Vande Bharat Express.

This conversion of 8 coaches to 16 coaches commenced on February 13, 2025, as this would benefit the passengers heading towards the metropolitan area of Kolkata, Howrah via the forest land of Jharkhand. On July 11th 2025 it was given the new 3rd generation Vande Bharat trainset having 20 coaches.

== Service ==
The 22347/22348 Howrah Jn - Patna Jn Vande Bharat Express operates six days a week except Wednesdays, covering a distance of 532 km (331 mi) in a travel time of 6 hours 35 mins with an average speed of 78 km/h (48 mph). The Maximum Permissible Speed is 130 km/h (81 mph).

== See also ==
- Vande Bharat Express
- Tejas Express
- Gatimaan Express
- Patna Junction railway station
- Howrah railway station
