= Patna–Gomti Nagar (Lucknow) Vande Bharat Express =

Mini Vande Bharat Express train route in India

Patna Junction - Gomti Nagar (Lucknow) Vande Bharat Express

Overview
- Service type: Vande Bharat Express
- Locale: Bihar and Uttar Pradesh
- First service: 12 March 2024 (Inaugural); 18 March 2024; 2 years ago (Commercial)
- Current operator: East Central Railways (ECR)

Route
- Termini: Patna Junction (PNBE); Gomti Nagar (GTNR)
- Stops: 5
- Distance travelled: 545 km (339 mi)
- Average journey time: 08 hrs 25 mins
- Service frequency: Six days a week (Note: Except Fridays)
- Train number: 22345 / 22346
- Lines used: Patna–DDU section; DDU–Kanpur section(till Varanasi Jn); Varanasi–Lucknow line

On-board services
- Classes: AC Chair Car, AC Executive Chair Car
- Seating arrangements: Airline style; Rotatable seats
- Sleeping arrangements: No
- Catering facilities: On board Catering
- Observation facilities: Large windows in all coaches
- Entertainment facilities: On-board WiFi; Infotainment System; Electric outlets; Reading light; Seat Pockets; Bottle Holder; Tray Table
- Baggage facilities: Overhead racks
- Other facilities: Kavach

Technical
- Rolling stock: Mini Vande Bharat 2.0
- Track gauge: Indian gauge 1,676 mm (5 ft 6 in) broad gauge
- Electrification: 25 kV 50 Hz AC Overhead line
- Operating speed: 65 km/h (40 mph) (Avg.)
- Average length: 192 metres (630 ft) (08 coaches)
- Track owner: Indian Railways
- Rake maintenance: (TBC)

The 22345/22346 Patna - Gomti Nagar (Lucknow) Vande Bharat Express is India's 51st Vande Bharat Express train, connecting the capital city of Bihar, Patna with the capital city Lucknow in Uttar Pradesh. This express train was inaugurated by Prime Minister Narendra Modi via video conferencing from Ahmedabad on March 12 2024. Rake sharing with 20th Vande Bharat Express of India 22349/50 Patna Jn (PNBE) - Ranchi (RNC).

== Overview ==
This train is operated by Indian Railways, connecting Patna Jn, Ara Jn, Buxar, Pandit Deen Dayal Upadhyaya Jn, Varanasi Jn, Ayodhya Dham Jn and Gomti Nagar (Lucknow). It is operated with train numbers 22345/22346 on 6 days a week basis.

== Rakes ==
It is the forty-ninth 2nd Generation and thirty-fourth Mini Vande Bharat 2.0 Express train which was designed and manufactured by the Integral Coach Factory at Perambur, Chennai under the Make in India Initiative.

== Service ==
The 22345/22346 Patna Jn - Gomti Nagar Vande Bharat Express operates six days a week except Fridays, covering a distance of 545 km (339 mi) in a travel time of 8 hours with an average speed of 64 km/h (40 mph). The service has 5 intermediate stops. The Maximum Permissible Speed is 130 km/h (81 mph).

== Route & Halts ==
Route and Schedule of 22345/22346 Patna-Gomti Nagar (Lucknow) Vande Bharat Express
Station	22345 Patna → Gomti Nagar (Lucknow)			22346 Gomti Nagar (Lucknow) → Patna		
Station	Arrival	Departure	Halt	Arrival	Departure	Halt
Patna Junction	—	06:05	—	23:45	—	—
Ara Junction	06:38	06:40	2m	22:33	22:35	2m
Buxar	07:18	07:20	2m	21:47	21:49	2m
Pandit Deen Dayal Upadhyaya Junction	08:30	08:35	5m	20:45	20:50	5m
Varanasi Junction	09:27	09:32	5m	19:55	20:00	5m
Ayodhya Dham Junction	12:10	12:15	5m	17:15	17:20	5m
Gomti Nagar	14:35	—	—	—	15:20	—

== See also ==
- Vande Bharat Express
- Tejas Express
- Gatimaan Express
- Patna Junction railway station
- Gomti Nagar railway station
