= Kumbh Express =

Train in India

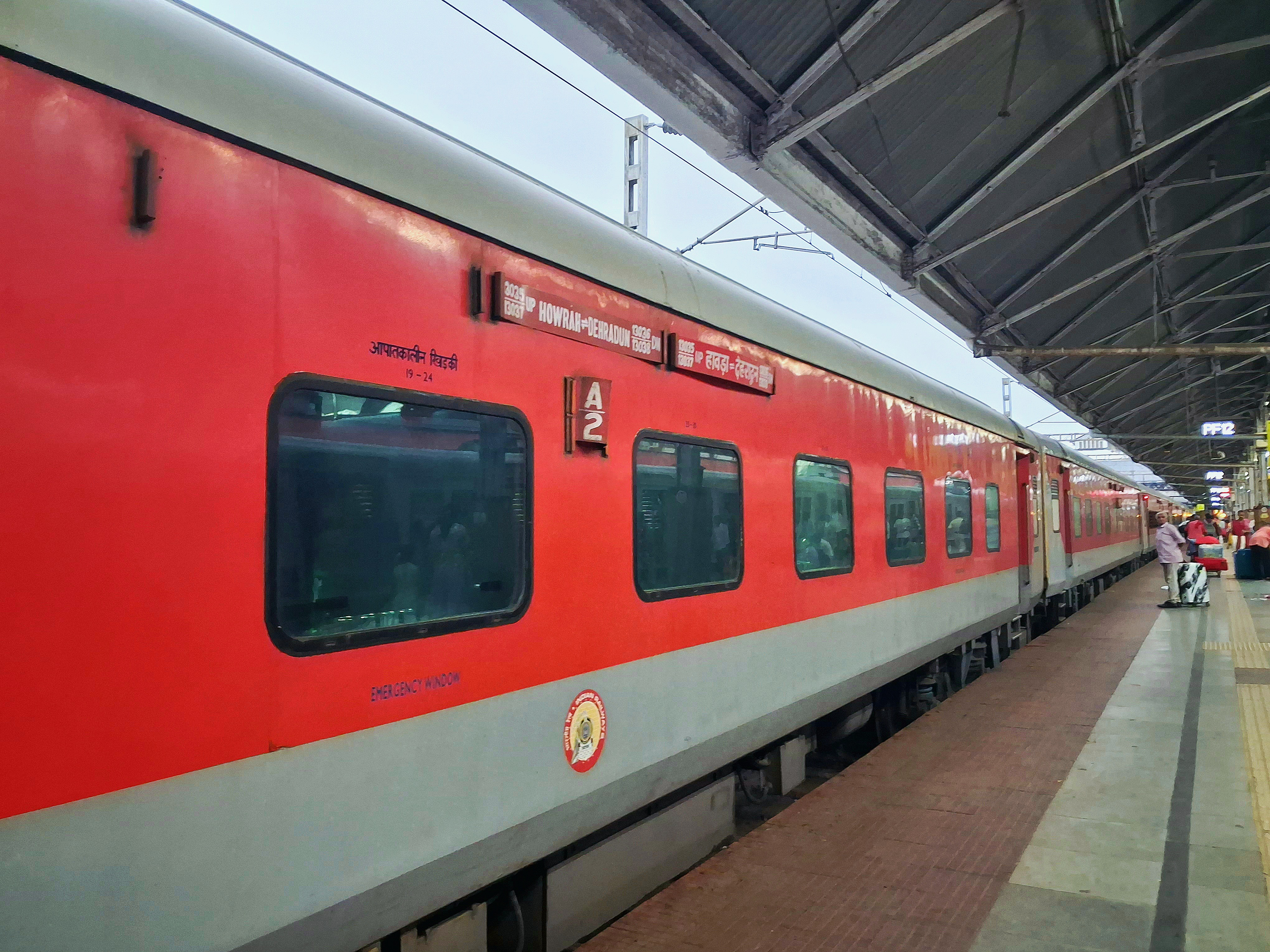
- Kumbh Express during its halt at Howrah Junction

Overview
- Service type: Express
- First service: 31 December 2009; 16 years ago
- Current operator: Eastern Railway
- Ridership: Reviews indicate the train frequently deals with overcrowding, particularly in sleeper class, with unauthorized passengers occupying seats.

Route
- Termini: Howrah (HWH); Dehradun (DDN)
- Stops: 25
- Distance travelled: 1,589 km (987 mi)
- Average journey time: 29 hours 10 minutes
- Service frequency: 5 days a week
- Train number: 13037 / 13038

On-board services
- Classes: AC First Class, AC 2 Tier, AC 3 Tier, Sleeper Class, General Unreserved
- Seating arrangements: Yes
- Sleeping arrangements: Yes
- Catering facilities: Available
- Observation facilities: Rake sharing with 13035/13036 Upasana Express
- Baggage facilities: Available
- Other facilities: Below the seats

Technical
- Rolling stock: LHB coach
- Track gauge: 1,676 mm (5 ft 6 in)
- Operating speed: 130 km/h (81 mph) maximum, 54 km/h (34 mph) average including halts.

The 13037 / 13038 Kumbh Express is a superfast express train belonging to Indian Railways – Eastern Railway zone that runs between Howrah Junction and Dehradun in India. The train was introduced in 2009 between Howrah Junction and Haridwar. Later it was extended to Dehradun on 13 January 2021.

It operates as train number 13037 from Howrah Junction to Dehradun and as train number 13038 in the reverse direction, serving the states of West Bengal, Jharkhand, Bihar, Uttar Pradesh and Uttarakhand. This train is also widely considered as the fastest train in the route of Howrah to Dehradun with also a high priority.

== Coaches ==
The train presently has 1 First AC, 2 AC 2 tier, 4 AC 3 tier, Pantry Car, 2 Sleeper class, 2 Unreserved/General, 1 SLR (Seating cum Luggage Rake) & 1 EOG (End On Generator Car) coaches additionally, it also has a pantry car. As is customary with most train services in India, coach composition may be amended at the discretion of Indian Railways depending on demand.

== Service ==
The 13037 Kumbh Express covers the distance of 1589 kilometres in 29 hours 10 mins (54 km/h) and 29 hours 30 mins as 13038 Kumbh Express (54 km/h).

== Routeing ==
The 13037/13038 Kumbha Express runs from Howrah via Asansol Junction, Chittaranjan, Madhupur Junction, Jasidih, Jhajha, Jamui, Kiul, Mokama, Bakhtiyarpur Junction, Patna Junction, Ara Junction, Buxar, Dildarnagar Junction, Pt. Deen Dayal Upadhyaya Junction, Varanasi Junction, Sultanpur Junction, Maharaja Bijli Pasi, Lucknow Charbagh, Bareilly Junction, Moradabad Junction, Laksar Junction, Haridwar to Dehradun

== Traction ==
As the route is fully electrified, it is hauled by a Howrah Loco Shed-based HWH WAP-5/WAP-7 locomotive from Howrah to Dehradun and vice versa.

== Timings ==
- 13037 Kumbh Express leaves Howrah Junction every day except Tuesday and Friday at 13:00 hrs IST and reaches Dehradun at 18:10 hrs IST the next day.
- 13038 Kumbh Express leaves Dehradun every day except Wednesday and Saturday at 21:45 hrs IST and reaches Howrah Junction at 03:15 hrs IST on the third day.

== Rake sharing ==
The train shares its rake with 13035/13036 Upasana Express.
