= Asansol–Mumbai CSMT Superfast Express =

Train in India

Asansol – Mumbai CSMT Superfast Express

Overview
- Service type: Superfast Express
- Current operator: Eastern Railways

Route
- Termini: Asansol Junction (ASN); Chhatrapati Shivaji Maharaj Terminus (CSMT)
- Stops: 18
- Distance travelled: 2,038 km (1,266 mi)
- Average journey time: 34 hours 15 minutes
- Service frequency: Weekly (Note: Runs one days in a week for every direction.)
- Train number: 12361/12362

On-board services
- Classes: AC 2 tier, AC 3 tier, Sleeper class, General Unreserved
- Seating arrangements: No
- Sleeping arrangements: Yes
- Catering facilities: Pantry car attached
- Observation facilities: LHB coach
- Entertainment facilities: No
- Baggage facilities: Below the seats

Technical
- Rolling stock: 2
- Track gauge: 1,676 mm (5 ft 6 in)
- Operating speed: 63 km/h (39 mph)

The 12361/ 12362 Asansol Jn. – Mumbai CSMT Superfast Express is a Superfast train of the Indian Railways connecting Asansol Junction in West Bengal and Chhatrapati Shivaji Maharaj Terminus of Maharashtra. It is currently being operated with 12361/12362 train numbers on once a week basis.

== Service ==
12361/ Asansol–Mumbai CSMT SF Express has an average speed of 60 km/h and covers 2037 km in 34 hrs 15 mins. 12362/Mumbai CSMT–Asansol SF Express has an average speed of 61 km/h and 2037 km in 33 hrs 15 mins.

== Route and halts ==
The important halts of the train are:

- Asansol Junction
- Jhajha
- Patna Junction
- Pandit Deen Dayal Upadhyaya Junction
- Mirzapur
- Satna Junction
- Katni Junction
- Jabalpur Junction
- Itarsi Junction
- Khandwa Junction
- Bhusaval Junction
- Manmad Junction
- Kalyan Junction
- Dadar
- Chhatrapati Shivaji Maharaj Terminus

== Coach composition ==
The train has standard LHB rakes with max speed of 130 kmph. The train consists of 22 coaches :

- 2 AC II Tier
- 6 AC III Tier
- 8 Sleeper coaches
- 3 General
- 1 Second-class Luggage/parcel van
- 1 EOG

== Traction ==
This train is hauled end-to-end by a Kalyan-based WAP-7 electric locomotive from Asansol to CSMT, and vice versa.

== See also ==
- Asansol Junction railway station
- Chhatrapati Shivaji Maharaj Terminus railway station
