= Patna–Mumbai CSMT Superfast Express =

Patna Junction - Mumbai CSMT Superfast Express

Overview
- Service type: Superfast Express
- First service: 25 July 2015; 10 years ago
- Current operator: East Central Railway zone

Route
- Termini: Patna Junction (PNBE); Chhatrapati Shivaji Terminus (CSTM)
- Stops: 7
- Distance travelled: 1,705.5 km (1,059.7 mi)
- Average journey time: 25h 45m as 22359 & 26h 35m as 22360
- Service frequency: Twice week
- Train number: 22359/22360

On-board services
- Classes: AC 1 Tier, AC 2 Tier, AC 3 Tier Economy, AC 3 Tier, Sleeper Tier
- Seating arrangements: No
- Sleeping arrangements: Yes
- Catering facilities: Yes
- Entertainment facilities: No

Technical
- Rolling stock: 2
- Track gauge: 1,676 mm (5 ft 6 in)
- Operating speed: 66 km/h (41 mph)
Route map
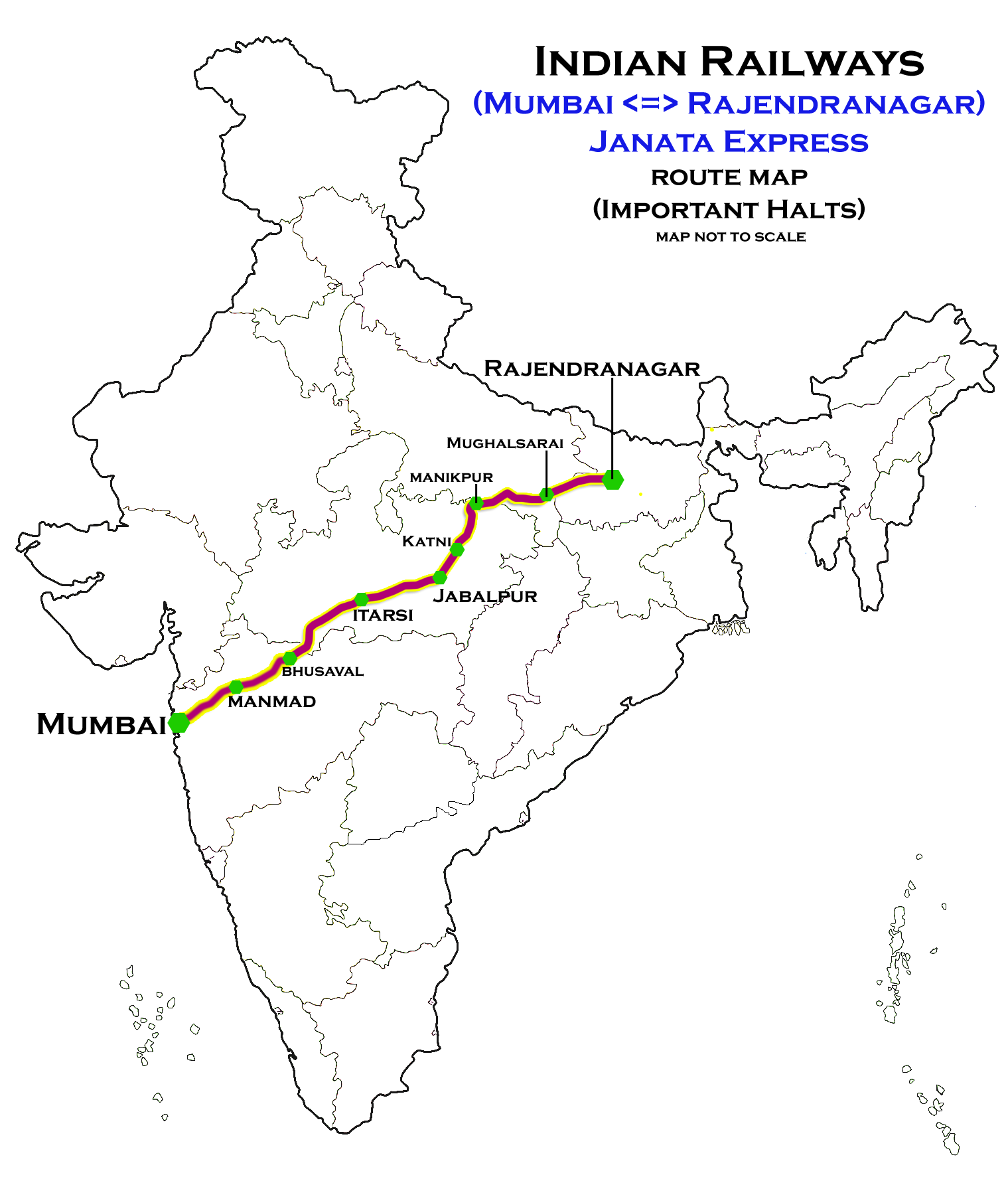
↓ 22359 • 22360 ↑

The Patna - Mumbai CSMT Superfast Express is a Superfast Express train of the Indian Railways connecting Chhatrapati Shivaji Maharaj Terminus railway station in Maharashtra and Patna Junction in Bihar. It is currently being operated with 22359/22360 train numbers on a twice week.

== Service ==
It averages 64 km/h as 22360 Mumbai CSMT - Patna Superfast Express starts on Sunday and Wednesday and covers 1705.5 km in 26 h 35 min & 66 km/h as 22359 Patna - Mumbai CSMT Superfast Express and covers 1705.5 km in 25 h 45 min.

== Coach composite ==
The train consists of 21 coaches:

- 1 AC I Tier
- 1 AC II Tier
- 4 AC III Tier
- 1 AC III Economy
- 8 Sleeper Coaches
- 1 Second-class Luggage/parcel van
- 5 AC III Tier Economy
- 1 pantry car

== See also ==
- Chhatrapati Shivaji Terminus
- Patna Junction
