= Vibhuti Express =

Train in India

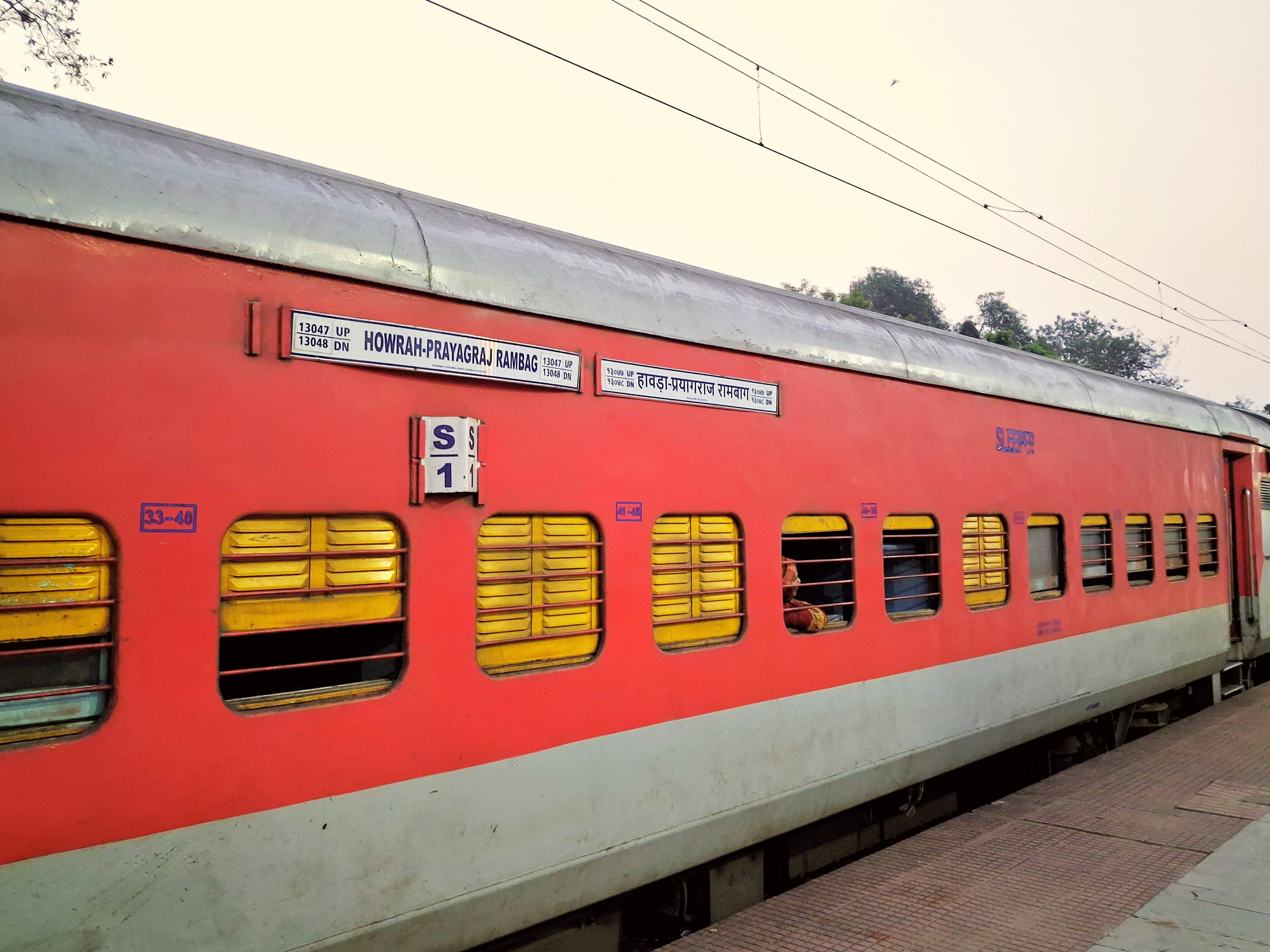
- Vibhuti Express at Madhupur Junction

Overview
- Service type: Superfast
- Status: Active
- First service: 28 September 2003; 22 years ago
- Current operator: Eastern Railway

Route
- Termini: Howrah Junction (HWH); Prayagraj Rambagh (PRRB)
- Stops: 32
- Distance travelled: 885 km (550 mi)
- Average journey time: 15 hours 55 minutes
- Service frequency: Daily
- Train number: 13047 / 13048

On-board services
- Classes: AC 2 Tier, AC 3 Tier, Sleeper Class, General Unreserved
- Seating arrangements: Yes
- Sleeping arrangements: Yes
- Catering facilities: E-catering only
- Observation facilities: Large windows
- Baggage facilities: Available
- Other facilities: Below the seats

Technical
- Rolling stock: LHB coach
- Track gauge: 1,676 mm (5 ft 6 in)
- Operating speed: 130 km/h (81 mph) maximum, 56 km/h (35 mph) average including halts.

The 13047 / 13048 Vibhuti Express is a Superfast Express train of Indian Railways – Eastern Railway zone that runs between Howrah Junction and Prayagraj Rambagh (Allahabad City) in India.

It operates as train number 13047 from Howrah Junction to Prayagraj Rambag and as train number 13048 in the reverse direction, serving the states of West Bengal, Jharkhand, Bihar and Uttar Pradesh.

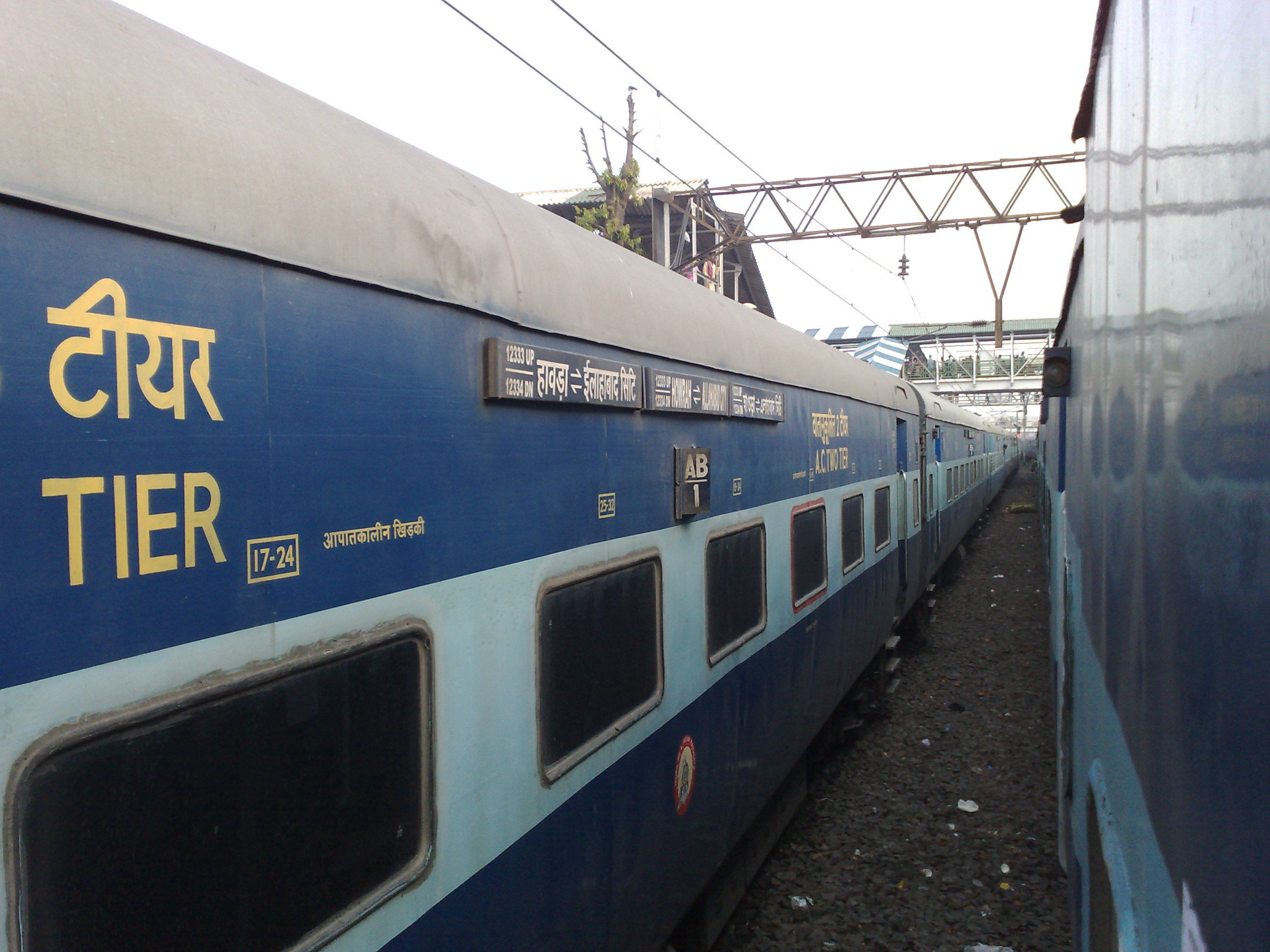
Vibhuti Express – coach AB1

== Coaches ==
The 12333 / 12334 Howrah–Prayagraj Rambag Vibhuti Express presently has 1 AC 2 tier, 4 AC 3 tier, 8 Sleeper Class, 4 General Class and 2 SLR (seating cum luggage rake) coaches. It does not have a pantry car.

As is customary with most train services in India, coach composition may be amended at the discretion of Indian Railways depending on demand.

== Service ==
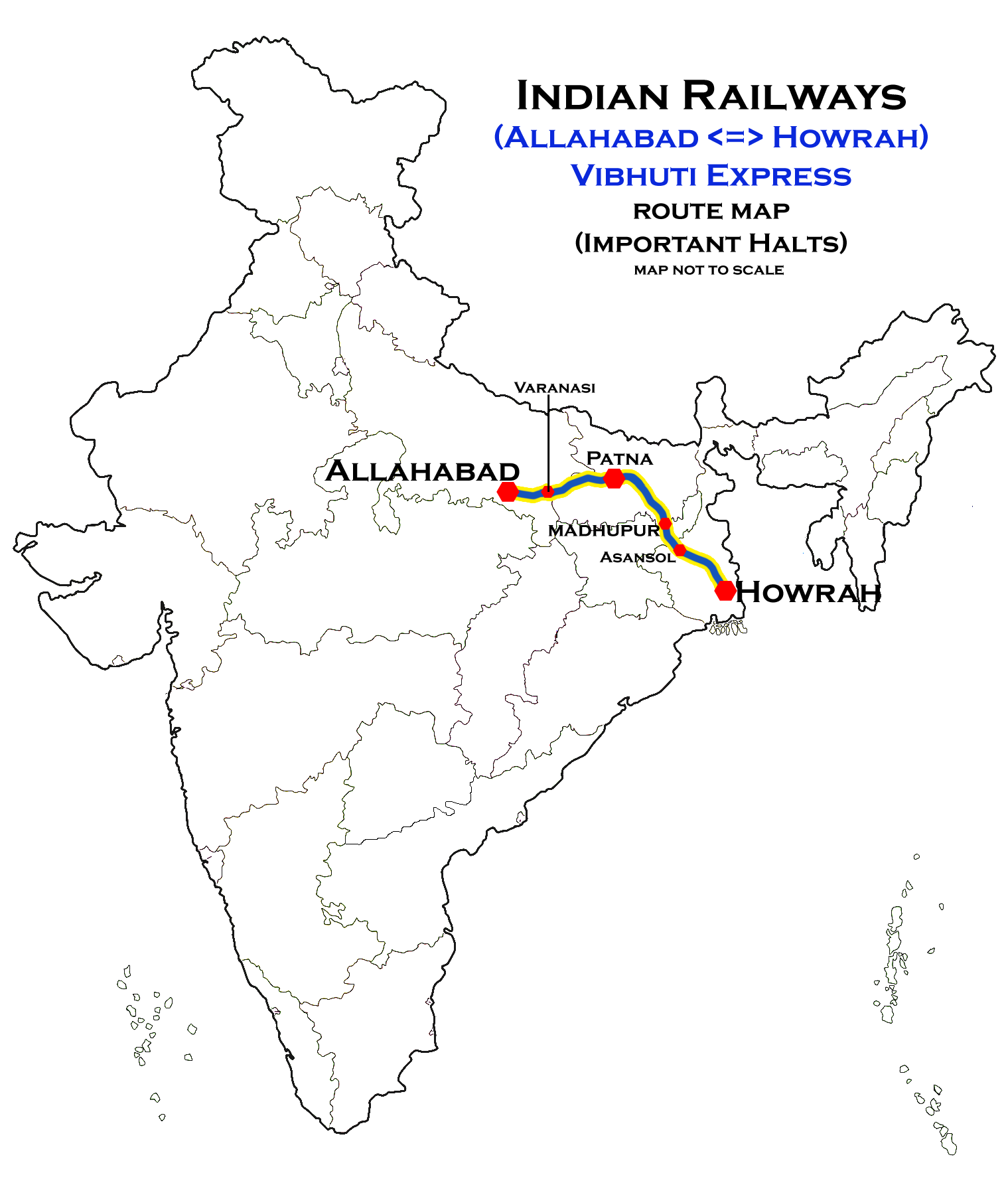

The 12333 Howrah–Prayagraj Rambag Vibhuti Express covers the distance of 882 kilometres in 16 hours 00 mins (55.13 km/h) and in 15 hours 50 mins as 12334 Prayagraj Rambag–Howrah Vibhuti Express (55.71 km/h).

As the average speed of the train is above 55 km/h (34 mph), as per Indian Railways rules, its fare includes a Superfast surcharge.

== Timings ==
- 13047 Howrah–Prayagraj Rambag Vibhuti Express leaves Howrah Junction on a daily basis at 19:55 hrs IST and reaches Prayagraj Rambag at 12:00 hrs IST the next day.
- 13048 Prayagraj Rambag–Howrah Vibhuti Express leaves Prayagraj Rambag on a daily basis at 15:40 hrs IST and reaches Howrah Junction at 07:35 hrs IST the next day.

== Traction ==
As the route is fully electrified, it is hauled by a Howrah Loco Shed based WAP-7 electric locomotive from Howrah to Prayagraj Rambag and vice versa.
