= Jhajha railway station =

Railway station in Jamui, Bihar, India

JHAJHA

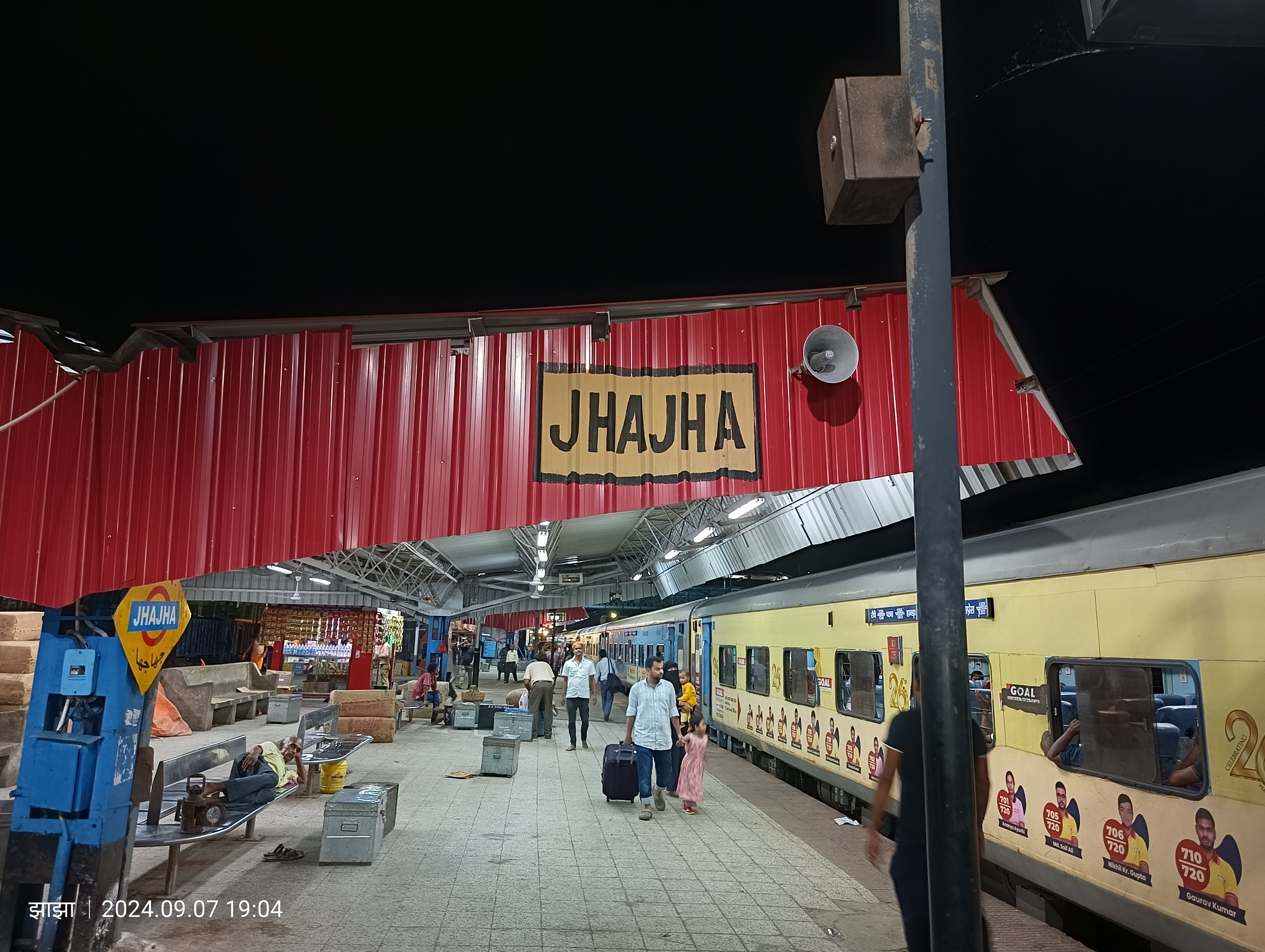
- Jhajha railway station, the train on the right is Howrah-Patna Jan Shatabdi Express

General information
- Location: Jhajha, Jamui district, Bihar; India
- Coordinates: 24°46′21″N 86°23′11″E
- Elevation: 143 metres (469 ft)
- System: Indian Railways station
- Owner: Indian Railways
- Operator: East Central Railway
- Line: Asansol–Patna section of Howrah–Delhi main line
- Platforms: 4
- Connections: Jasidih Junction, Kiul Junction

Construction
- Parking: Available

Other information
- Status: Functional
- Station code: JAJ
- Zone(s): East Central Railway
- Division(s): Danapur

History
- Opened: 1871
- Electrified: 1997–1999
Route map
Location
- Location within Bihar Location within India
- Interactive map of Jhajha

Jhajha Station, station code JAJ, is the railway station serving the city of Jhajha in the Jamui district in the Indian state of Bihar. The Jhajha railway station is the easternmost station on the mainline section of the Danapur division of the East Central Railway zone. Jhajha Station is connected to metropolitan area of India by Howrah–Delhi main line via Patna–Mughalsarai section. It is located at 24°46′21″N 86°23′11″E and has an average elevation of 143 metres (469 ft). It is located in front of a large red soil hill and is surrounded many forests. The station has "pristine beauty".

== History ==
The first rail track between Howrah and Delhi was via what was later named as Sahibganj loop and the first through train on the route was run in 1864. The Kiul–Patna sector was ready around 1862.The 'Shorter Main Line' on the Delhi–Calcutta route (via Jhajha, Patna) is in place with the completion of the section from Raniganj to Kiul. The Jhajha–Kiul section was electrified in 1997–98 and the Narganjo–Jhajha section was electrified in 1998–99.

== Facilities ==
The major facilities available are waiting rooms, computerized reservation facility, reservation counter, two-wheeler and four-wheeler vehicle parking. The vehicles are allowed to enter the station premises. The station also has STD/ISD/PCO telephone booth, ATM counter, toilets, refreshment room, tea stall and book stall. The station also has rest rooms (running rooms) for the railway employees.

There are Government Railway Police (GRP) and Railway Protection Force (RPF) deputed for the security of the station. A Railway hospital is also located nearby.

=== Platforms ===
There are 4 platforms. The platforms are connected by the foot overbridge (FOB).

== Trains ==
Many express and passenger trains serve Jhajha station.

The Following trains have a halt at Jhajha. The Trains are Poorva Express (via Patna), Dhanbad–Patna Intercity Express, Akal Takht Express, Upasana Express, Kumbh Express,etc.

== Further extension ==
There are proposals from the Railway Ministry to connect Jhajha station with New Giridih via Sono, Batia, Chakai and Bengabad. The 95-km-long stretch will have 9 crossing stations. The first phase of the project involves 20-km-long Jhajha–Batia section, the foundation for which was laid in 2019 and which will be constructed at a cost of Rs 496 crore.
