= Ara Junction railway station =

Railway station in Arrah, Bihar, India

ARA JUNCTION

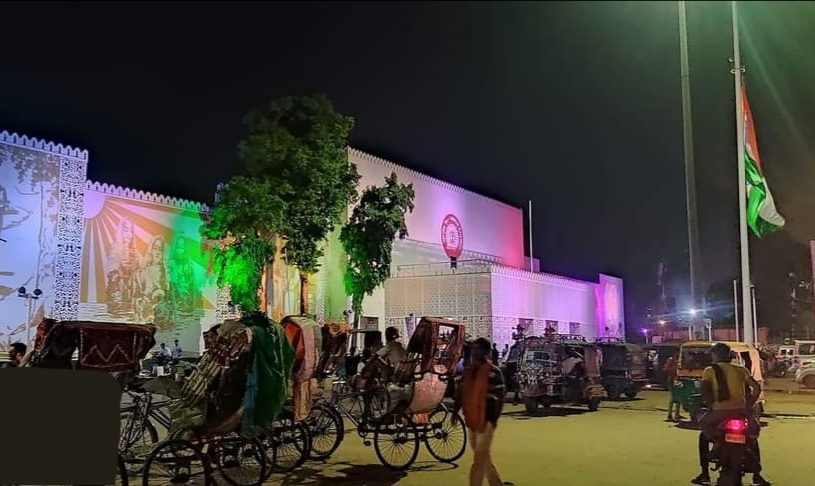
- Outside view of Ara Junction railway station

General information
- Location: Station Road, Nawada, Arrah, Bhojpur, Bihar; India (802301)
- Coordinates: 25.5488°N 84.6614°E
- Elevation: 59 metres (194 ft)
- System: Indian Railways station
- Owner: Indian Railways
- Operator: East Central Railways
- Lines: Howrah-Patna-Delhi main line; Patna–Mughalsarai section; Ara–Sasaram line; Neora–Daniyawan–Bihar Sharif–Sheikhpura line
- Platforms: 6 (2 proposed)
- Tracks: 7
- Connections: Functioning

Construction
- Structure type: Standard (on-ground station)
- Parking: Available
- Accessible: Available

Other information
- Status: Active
- Station code: ARA
- Zone(s): East Central Railway zone
- Division(s): Danapur

History
- Opened: Estd-1904
- Electrified: 2001; 25 years ago

Passengers
- 2022: 200,000 per day
Services
Preceding station	Indian Railways	Following station
Jamira Halt towards Patna Junction or Howrah Junction	Howrah–Delhi main line (Patna–Mughalsarai section)	Jagjivan Halt towards Mughalsarai Junction or New Delhi
Terminus	Ara–Sasaram line	Udwantnagar towards Sasaram Junction
Route map
- Source: Google maps 13039 Howrah–Delhi Janata Express
Location
- Location within India Location within Bihar
- Interactive map of Ara Junction

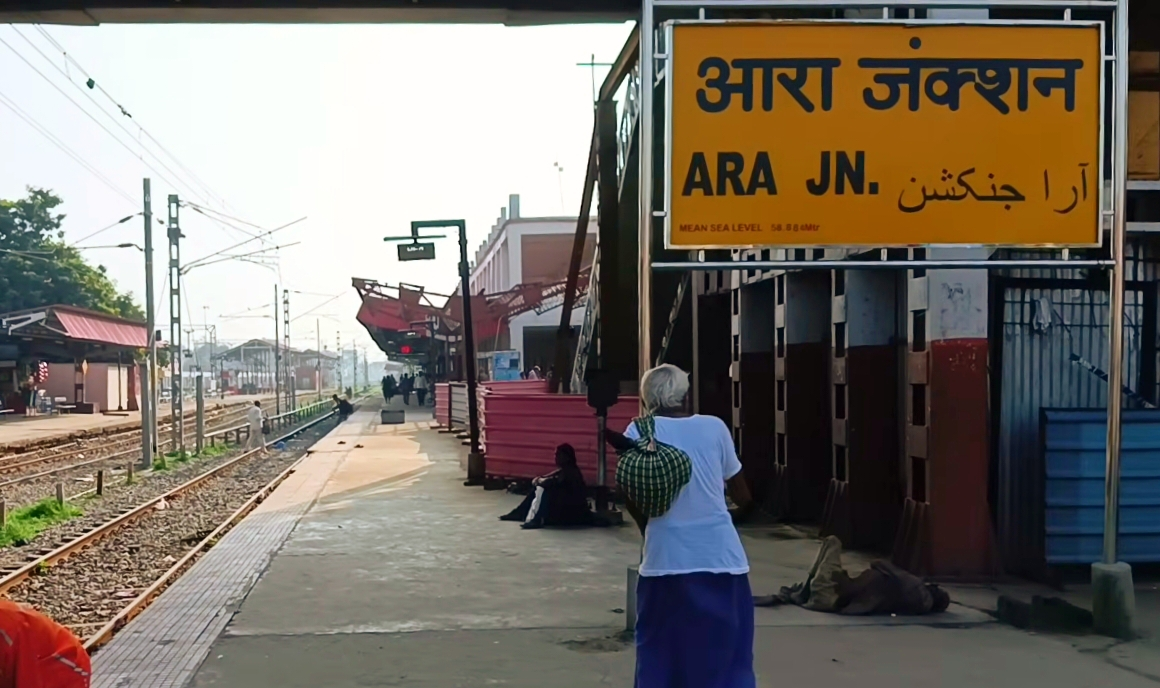
Ara Junction railway station nameboard

Ara Junction railway station (station code: ARA) serves the city of Arrah in Bihar's Bhojpur district. It is an important station on the Howrah–Delhi main line, situated between Patna Junction and Pt. Deen Dayal Upadhyaya Junction on the Patna–DDU section. The station is part of the Danapur division of East Central Railway and is served by numerous passenger and long-distance trains.

Arrah is well connected to Patna, New Delhi, Mumbai, Kolkata, Bangalore, Kanpur, Pune, Ahmedabad, Chennai, Siliguri, Lucknow, Agra, Prayagraj, Varansi, Bhopal, Jaipur, Surat, Kota, Katihar, Amritsar, Chandigarh, Secunderabad, Guwahati, Ranchi, Jammu and Kashmir, Ajmer, Goa, Ernakulam, Anand Vihar Terminal, Jhansi, Jodhpur, Haridwar, Mysuru, Dibrugarh and other cities of India.

== History ==
Ara Junction has a railway history dating back to the British colonial period. It was an important station on the East Indian Railway's main line connecting the Howrah and Delhi regions. The station later became a junction with the opening of the broad-gauge Ara–Sasaram railway line in February 2009, adding a new rail connection towards southern Bihar.

A narrow-gauge railway between Ara and Sasaram was subsequently operated by the private Martin's Light Railway. Services on this route began in 1914 and continued until 1978, when the company discontinued operations. The route was later rebuilt as a broad-gauge line and reopened in 2009.

== Facilities ==
The station is equipped with automatic ticket vending machines (ATVMs), allowing passengers to purchase unreserved tickets without having to queue at booking counters.

=== Platforms ===
Ara Junction has four platforms, which are interconnected by two pedestrian foot-overbridges (FOBs). In May 2025, an additional foot-overbridge was reported as being planned near the station to improve connectivity for residents of nearby localities. A separate redevelopment proposal also included the construction of two additional platforms and another foot-overbridge.
