= Howrah–Rajgir Fast Passenger =

Train in India

Overview
- Service type: Passenger
- Status: 2018 (Discontinued due to COVID)
- Current operator: Eastern Railway

Route
- Termini: Howrah Junction (HWH); Rajgir (RGD)
- Stops: 81
- Distance travelled: 656 km (408 mi)
- Average journey time: 23h 45m
- Service frequency: Daily (Note: Runs seven days in a week for every direction.)
- Train number: 53043/53044

On-board services
- Class: Unreserved
- Seating arrangements: Yes
- Sleeping arrangements: No
- Catering facilities: No
- Observation facilities: ICF coach
- Entertainment facilities: No
- Baggage facilities: Below the seats

Technical
- Rolling stock: 2
- Track gauge: 5 ft 6 in (1,676 mm)
- Electrification: No
- Operating speed: 28 km/h (17 mph) average with halts

Howrah–Rajgir Fast Passenger was a passenger train belonging to Eastern Railway zone that ran between Howrah Junction and Rajgir via Bardhaman, Rampurhat, Sahibganj, Bhagalpur. It was being operated with 53043/53044 train numbers on a daily basis. It is currently Not operating and cancelled.

== Average speed and frequency ==
The 53043/Howrah–Rajgir Fast Passenger runs with an average speed of 28 km/h and completes 656 km in 23h 45m. The 53044/Rajgir–Howrah Fast Passenger runs with an average speed of 28 km/h and completes 656 km in 23h 45m.

== Route and halts ==
The important halts of the train are:

- Howrah Junction
- Barddhaman Junction
- Guskara
- Rampurhat Junction
- Barharwa Junction
- Sakrigali
- Sahibganj Junction
- Shivanarayanpur
- Kahalgaon
- Bhagalpur Junction
- Jamalpur Junction
- Kajra
- Kiul Junction
- Mokama
- Athmal Gola
- Bakhtiyarpur Junction
- Bihar Sharif Junction
- Nalanda
- Rajgir

Note: Bold letters indicates Major Railway Stations/Major Cities.

== Coach composite ==
The train has standard ICF rakes with max speed of 110 kmph. The train consists of 11 coaches:

- 9 General Unreserved
- 2 Seating cum Luggage Rake

== Traction ==
Both trains are hauled by a Howrah Loco Shed-based WDM-3A diesel locomotive from Howrah to Rajgir and vice versa.

== Rake sharing ==
The train shares its rake with 53041/53042 Howrah–Jaynagar Passenger.

== Direction reversal ==
Train reverses its direction 1 times:

- Bakhtiyarpur Junction

== Timing ==
53044 – Starts daily from Rajgir at 12:40 PM IST and reaches Howrah Junction on 2nd day at 12:10 PM IST

53043 – Starts daily from Howrah at 11:10 AM and reaches Rajgir on dy 2 at 10:55 AM

== See also ==
- Rajgir railway station
- Howrah Junction railway station
- Howrah–Jaynagar Passenger
