= Malda Town–Patna Express =

Train in India

Overview
- Service type: Express
- First service: 27 February 2009; 16 years ago
- Current operator(s): Eastern Railway

Route
- Termini: Malda Town (MLDT); Patna Junction (PNBE)
- Stops: 17
- Distance travelled: 403 km (250 mi)
- Average journey time: 9 hours 50 minutes
- Service frequency: Tri-weekly (Note: Runs three days in a week for every direction.)
- Train number(s): 13415 / 13416

On-board services
- Class(es): AC 2 tier, AC 3 tier, Sleeper Class, General Unreserved
- Seating arrangements: Yes
- Sleeping arrangements: Yes
- Catering facilities: On-board catering, E-catering
- Observation facilities: Large windows
- Baggage facilities: No
- Other facilities: Below the seats

Technical
- Rolling stock: ICF coach
- Track gauge: 1,676 mm (5 ft 6 in)
- Operating speed: 43 km/h (27 mph) average including halts.

The 13415 / 13416 Malda Town–Patna Express is an Express train belonging to Eastern Railway zone that runs between Malda Town and Patna Junction in India. It is currently being operated with 13415/13416 train numbers on tri-weekly basis.

== Service ==
The 13415/Malda Town–Patna Express has an average speed of 45 km/h and covers 403 km in 9h. The 13416/Patna–Malda Town Express Express has an average speed of 38 km/h and covers 403 km in 10h 35m.

== Route and halts ==
The important halts of the train are:

- Malda Town
- New Farakka Junction
- Barharwa Junction
- Sahibganj Junction
- Kahalgaon
- Bhagalpur Junction
- Sultanganj
- Jamalpur Junction
- Abhaipur
- Kiul Junction
- Hathidah Junction
- Mokama
- Barh
- Bakhtiyarpur Junction
- Fatuha Junction
- Patna Sahib
- Rajendra Nagar Terminal
- Patna Junction

== Coach composition ==
The train has standard ICF (utkristh) rakes with max speed of 110 kmph. The train consists of 18 coaches:

- 1 AC II Tier
- 1 AC III Tier
- 8 Sleeper coaches
- 6 General
- 2 Seating cum Luggage Rake

== Traction ==
Both trains are hauled by a DDU Loco Shed-based WAP-4 electric locomotive from Malda Town to Patna Junction and vice versa.

== See also ==
- Malda Town railway station
- Patna Junction railway station
- Sealdah–Varanasi Express
- Sealdah–Anand Vihar Express
