= Howrah–Gaya Express =

Train in India

Overview
- Service type: Express
- First service: 15 February 2002; 24 years ago
- Current operator: Eastern Railway

Route
- Termini: Howrah (HWH); Gaya Junction (GAYA)
- Stops: 31
- Distance travelled: 654 km (406 mi)
- Average journey time: 14 hrs 55 mins
- Service frequency: Daily (Note: Runs seven days in a week for every direction.)
- Train number: 13023 / 13024

On-board services
- Classes: AC 2 Tier, AC 3 Tier, Sleeper Class, General Unreserved
- Seating arrangements: Yes
- Sleeping arrangements: Yes
- Catering facilities: On-board catering, E-catering
- Observation facilities: Large windows
- Baggage facilities: No
- Other facilities: Below the seats

Technical
- Rolling stock: LHB coach
- Track gauge: 1,676 mm (5 ft 6 in)
- Operating speed: 44 km/h (27 mph) average including halts

The 13023 / 13024 Howrah–Gaya Express is an Express train belonging to Eastern Railway zone that runs between Howrah Junction and Gaya Junction in India via Rampurhat, Bhagalpur. It is currently being operated with 13023/13024 train numbers on a daily basis.

== Service ==
The 13023/Howrah–Gaya Express has an average speed of 44 km/h and covers 655 km in 14h 55m. The 13024/Gaya–Howrah Express has an average speed of 43 km/h and covers 655 km in 15h 20m.

== Route and halts ==
The important halts of the train are:

- Howrah Junction
- Bandel Junction
- Barddhaman Junction
- Guskara
- Bolpur Shantiniketan
- Sainthia Junction
- Rampurhat Junction
- Pakur
- Barharwa Junction
- Tinpahar Junction
- Sahibganj Junction
- Pirpainti
- Kahalgaon
- Bhagalpur Junction
- Jamalpur Junction
- Abhaipur
- Kajra
- Kiul Junction
- Lakhisarai Junction
- Sheikhpura
- Nawadah
- Tilaiya Junction
- Gaya Junction

Note: Bold letters indicates Major Railway Stations/Major Cities.

== Coach composition ==
The train has LHB rakes with max speed of 130 kmph. The train consists of 15 coaches:

- 1 AC II Tier
- 2 AC III Tier
- 4 Sleeper coaches
- 6 General
- 2 Generators cum Luggage/parcel van

== Traction ==
Both trains are hauled by a Howrah Loco Shed-based WAP-4 / WAP-5 electric locomotive from Howrah to Gaya and vice versa.

== See also ==
- Doon Express
