= Howrah–Sahibganj Intercity Express =

Overview
- Service type: Express
- First service: 11 October 2024
- Current operator: Eastern Railway

Route
- Termini: Howrah (HWH); Sahibganj (SBG)
- Stops: 8
- Distance travelled: 351km (218 mi)
- Average journey time: 6 hours 50 minutes
- Service frequency: Daily
- Train number: 13427/13428
- Lines used: Howrah–Barddhaman main line; Barddhaman–Rampurhat section; Rampurhat–Sahibganj section; class = Unreserved, second class reservation

On-board services
- Seating arrangements: Yes
- Sleeping arrangements: No
- Auto-rack arrangements: Overhead racks
- Catering facilities: No
- Observation facilities: Large windows

Technical
- Rolling stock: ICF coach
- Operating speed: 51 km/h
- Rake maintenance: Sahibganj Junction
- Rake sharing: No RSA

The 13427/28 Howrah–Sahibganj Intercity Express is a Express train of the Indian Railways connecting Howrah in West Bengal and Sahibganj Junction in Jharkhand via Barddhaman Junction and Rampurhat Junction. It is currently being operated with 13427/28 train numbers on a daily basis.

== Service ==
The 13427/HWH SBG IC has an average speed of 52 km/h and covers 351 km in 6h 50m . The 13428/SBG HWH IC has an average speed of 51 km/h and covers 351 km in 6h 55m.

== Schedule halt ==
SBG-HWH-SBG Intercity Express
13428		Stations	13427	
Arrival	Departure	Stations	Arrival	Departure
SRC	05.20 AM	Sahibganj Junction	08.35 PM	DSTN
05.23 AM	05.24 AM	Sakrigali	08.07 PM	08.08 PM
05.45 AM	05.47 AM	Tinpahar Junction	07.24 PM	07.26 PM
06.25 AM	06.27 AM	Barharwa Junction	07.05 PM	07.07 PM
06.47 AM	06.49 AM	Pakur	06.15 PM	06.17 PM
07.48 AM	07.50 AM	Rampurhat Junction (Watering)	05.30 PM	05.32 PM
08.31 AM	08.33 AM	Bolpur Shantiniketan	04.26 PM	04.31 PM
09.37 AM	09.39 AM	Barddhaman Junction	03.40 PM	03.42 PM
10.40 AM	10.42 AM	Bandel Junction	02.25 PM	02.27 PM
12.15 PM	DSTN	Howrah	SRC	01.45 PM

== Coach composition ==
The train has standard single ICF rakes with max permissible speed of 110kmph. The train consists of 11 coaches:

- 2 SLRD
- 6 Unreserved coach
- 3 Reserved coach (D1, D2, D3)

== Traction ==
Both trains are hauled by a Howrah Loco Shed-based WAP-4 electric locomotive from Howrah to Sahibganj Junction and vice versa.
