= Sealdah–Anand Vihar Terminal Express =

Superfast train in India

Sealdah–Anand Vihar Terminal (Upper India) Express
Overview
- Service type: Express
- First service: 6 July 2014
- Last service: 8 November 2020 (Discontinued due to COVID)
- Current operator: Eastern Railways

Route
- Termini: Sealdah; Anand Vihar Terminal
- Stops: 34
- Distance travelled: 1,634 km (1,015 mi)
- Average journey time: 39 hours 35 mins
- Service frequency: bi-weekly
- Train number: 13119 / 13120

On-board services
- Classes: AC 1st Class, AC 2 tier, AC 3 tier, Sleeper, General
- Sleeping arrangements: Yes
- Catering facilities: No Pantry Car Coach attached

Technical
- Rolling stock: ICF Coach
- Track gauge: 1,676 mm (5 ft 6 in)
- Operating speed: 140 km/h (87 mph) maximum,42 km/h (26 mph), including halts

Sealdah–Anand Vihar Terminal (Upper India) Express was an Express train belonging to Eastern Railway zone of Indian Railways that ran between Sealdah and Anand Vihar Terminal (ANVT) in India via Rampurhat, Sahibganj, Bhagalpur.The service was cancelled in 2020. Before cancellation, it ran from ANVT on Tuesdays & Saturdays and from Sealdah on Sundays & Thursdays.

== Background ==
This train was inaugurated on 6 July 2014 from Sealdah, which is an extension of Sealdah - Varanasi Express up to Anand Vihar Terminal which situates in Delhi. It was done after the service of Lal Quila Express was ended and the passengers of Delhi was also increased for direct connectivity to Kolkata.

== Important Halts ==
The important halts of the train are:

- Sealdah
- Bidhannagar Road
- Barddhaman Junction
- Bolpur Shantiniketan
- Rampurhat Junction
- Barharwa Junction
- Sahibganj Junction
- Bhagalpur Junction
- Jamalpur Junction
- Kiul Junction
- Lakhisarai Junction
- Barh
- Bakhtiyarpur Junction
- Patna Sahib
- Gulzarbagh
- Rajendra Nagar Terminal
- Patna Junction
- Phulwari Sharif
- Danapur
- Ara Junction
- Buxar
- Dildarnagar Junction
- Zamania
- Mughalsarai Junction
- Varanasi Junction

Note: Bold letters indicates Major Railway Stations/Major Cities.

== Service ==
The frequency of this train is bi-weekly and covers the distance of 1634 km with an average speed of 42 km/h with a total time of 37hr 50 min . Now the train has standard LCF rakes with max speed of 110 kmph. The train consists of 17 coaches:

2 AC III Tier 6 Sleeper Coaches 5 General 2 Seating cum Luggage Rake 1 Railway Mail Service 1 Parcel van

== Routes ==
This train passes through Barddhaman Junction, Rampurhat Junction, Sahebganj, Bhagalpur Junction, Patna Junction, Mughalsarai Junction, Varanasi Junction, Lucknow Charbagh Hardoi& Moradabad on both sides.

== Traction ==
As the route is partially electrified a WDM-3A loco pulls the train to its destination on both sides.
