= Howrah–Jamalpur Express =

Train in India

Overview
- Service type: Express
- First service: 2 October 1984; 41 years ago
- Current operator: Eastern Railway

Route
- Termini: Howrah (HWH); Jamalpur (JMP)
- Stops: 19
- Distance travelled: 467 km (290 mi)
- Average journey time: 9 hrs 35 mins
- Service frequency: Daily (Note: Runs seven days in a week for every direction.)
- Train number: 13071 / 13072

On-board services
- Classes: AC First, AC 2 Tier, AC 3 Tier, Sleeper Class, General Unreserved
- Seating arrangements: Yes
- Sleeping arrangements: Yes
- Catering facilities: On-board catering, E-catering
- Observation facilities: Large windows
- Baggage facilities: No
- Other facilities: Below the seats

Technical
- Rolling stock: LHB coach
- Track gauge: 1,676 mm (5 ft 6 in)
- Operating speed: 49 km/h (30 mph) average including halts.

The 13071 / 13072 Howrah–Jamalpur Express (Super Express) is an Express train belonging to Eastern Railway zone that runs between Howrah Junction and Jamalpur Junction in India via Rampurhat, Bhagalpur.It is currently being operated with 13071/13072 train numbers on a daily basis.

== Service ==
The 13071/Howrah–Jamalpur Super Express has an average speed of 49 km/h and covers 467 km in 9h 35m. The 13072/Jamalpur–Howrah Super Express has an average speed of 47 km/h and covers 467 km in 10h.

== Route and halts ==
The important halts of the train are:

- Howrah Junction
- Barddhaman Junction
- Bolpur Shantiniketan
- Sainthia Junction
- Rampurhat Junction
- Barharwa Junction
- Tinpahar Junction
- Sahibganj Junction
- Kahalgaon
- Bhagalpur Junction
- Jamalpur Junction

Note: Bold letters indicates Major Railway Stations/Major Cities.

== Schedule ==
13071/72

Train number	Station code	Departure station	Departure time	Arrival station	Arrival time
13071	HWH	Howrah Junction	9:35 PM	Jamalpur Junction	7:25 AM (next day)
13072	JMP	Jamalpur Junction	7:30 PM	Howrah Junction	5:45 AM (next day)

== Coach composition ==
The train has standard LHB rakes with max speed of 130 kmph. The train consists of 21 coaches:

- 1 AC first-class
- 3 AC II tier
- 2 AC III tier
- 3 AC III tier economy
- 7 sleeper
- 3 general
- 2 guard, second sitting cum luggage/parcel van

== Traction ==
Both trains are hauled by a Howrah Loco Shed-based WAP-5 / WAP-7 electric locomotive from Howrah to Jamalpur and vice versa.

== See also ==
- Howrah Junction railway station
- Jamalpur Junction railway station
- Vikramshila Express
