= Kahalgaon subdivision =

Administrative subdivision in Bhagalpur district, Bihar, India

- Subdivision
- Interactive map of Kahalgaon subdivision
- Coordinates: 25.2400°N 87.2647°E
- Country: India
- State: Bihar

Area
  - Total: 786.5 km^{2} (303.7 sq mi)

Population (2011)
  - Total: 843,039
  - Density: 1,072/km^{2} (2,776/sq mi)
- Time zone: UTC+5:30 (IST)
- Vehicle registration: BR-10

Kahalgaon Subdivision is a administrative Subdivision in the Bhagalpur district of Bihar, India.Comprises three community development blocks — Kahalgaon, Pirpainti, and Sanhaula. The Subdivision headquarters is at Kahalgaon town.

== Geography ==
Kahalgaon Subdivision lies on the southern bank of the Ganges River, bounded by Godda district of Jharkhand to the southeast. The region is part of the fertile Anga plains and includes riverine belts along the Uttarvahini Ganga.

== Administrative Divisions ==
The Subdivision include the following blocks:

- Kahalgaon Block
- Pirpainti Block
- Sanhaula Block

== Demographics ==
As per the 2011 Census of India, the combined population of the three blocks that would constitute Kahalgaon Sub division is:

Block	Population	Notes
Kahalgaon	365,285	Includes urban town area
Pirpainti	285,357	Entirely rural block
Sanhaula	192,397	Mostly rural block
Total	843,039	As of 2011 census

- Pirpainti had a town population of 9,021 (4,786 males; 4,235 females) across 1,635 households.
- Sanhaula is a block with multiple villages; the block population was 192,397.

== Languages ==
The official languages are Hindi and Urdu, with Angika widely spoken in daily use.

== Economy ==
The region is economically driven by thermal power generation, agriculture, and rural trade. Major economic contributors include:

=== NTPC Kahalgaon Super Thermal Power Station ===
- Total installed capacity: 2,340 MW (4×210 MW + 3×500 MW)
- Operated by NTPC Limited
- Coal sourced from Rajmahal coalfield
- Water drawn from Ganges River
- FY 2023–24 generation: 16,555.02 million units, one of the highest in eastern India.
- A 3 MW solar unit was launched in December 2020, reducing carbon output by 6,400 tonnes annually.

=== Transport ===
- **Railways**: Major stations include Kahalgaon railway station and Pirpainti railway station, both on the Sahibganj loop.
- **Roads**: The Subdivision is linked by state highways and rural roads, with connections to NH-80 and NH-33.

== Culture and Tourism ==
Kahalgaon Sub Division includes sites of cultural and ecological importance:

- Ashtavakra Mandir: A newly built temple dedicated to the sage Ashtavakra, inaugurated in 2023.
- Vikramshila Gangetic Dolphin Sanctuary: A 60 km protected stretch along the Ganga River, home to the endangered Ganges river dolphin.
- Vikramashila University Ruins: Ancient center of Buddhist learning built under the Pala Empire.
- Bateshwar Hills: Site of historic Shiva temples and cave shrines.

== See also ==
- Bhagalpur district
- NTPC Kahalgaon
- Pirpainti
- Angika
- Ganges river
