= Rampurhat Junction railway station =

Railway station in West Bengal, India

RAMPURHAT JUNCTION রামপুরহাট জংশন रामपुरहाट जंक्शन
- Rampurhat station – front view

General information
- Location: Rampurhat, Birbhum District, West Bengal; India
- Coordinates: 24°10′45″N 87°46′55″E
- Elevation: 143 metres (469 ft)
- System: Indian Railways
- Owner: Indian Railways
- Operator: Eastern Railway
- Lines: Howrah–New Jalpaiguri main line; Rampurhat–Malda Town section; Bardhaman–Rampurhat section; Jasidih–Dumka–Rampurhat line; Rampurhat–Dumka-Godda line; Rampurhat–Dumka-Bhagalpur line; Andal–Sainthia-Rampurhat line; Katwa-Ahmadpur-Rampurhat line; Rampurhat–Pakur-Sahibganj lLine; Rampurhat–Nalhati-Azimganj line
- Platforms: 6 (1A,1,2,3,4,5) [PF 6,7 is under consideration]
- Tracks: 13
- Connections: Auto rickshaw, E-rickshaw, Bus

Construction
- Structure type: At grade
- Parking: Available
- Cycle facilities: Available

Other information
- Status: Triple-line electrification
- Station code: RPH
- Zone(s): Eastern Railway
- Classification: NSG-3

History
- Opened: 1858
- Electrified: Yes(2016)

Passengers
- 35M/year: 96K/day (▲ High )
Location
- Location within India Location within West Bengal
- Interactive map of Rampurhat Junction

Rampurhat Junction railway station is 7th busiest railway stations of Eastern Railway zone and it is the largest and busiest railway station of Birbhum district of West Bengal. It is a NSG-3 Category and Class A station. The station is under Howrah railway division is the 3rd busiest station in this division. It is 207 kilometres (shortest route) away from Howrah Junction. This station is famous for serving Rampurhat city and providing vital connectivity to surrounding districts and states.It is also the main gateway for the Religion Pilgrims visiting to Tarapith Maa Tara Temple. Rampurhat Junction welcomes a steady stream of thousands of pilgrims daily to visit Tarapith Temple. From the far corners of West Bengal to distant regions across India, devotees undertake this sacred journey to seek divine blessings and experience the spiritual aura of the holy shrine. Rampurhat station is connected to almost every part of India. More than 150 express and passengers trains including 19 originating & terminating trains pass through the Rampurhat station every day.

== Rankings of Rampurhat Junction as per Revenue ==
| Place | Rank |
|---|---|
| Birbhum District | 1st |
| Sahibganj loop | 2nd (After Bhagalpur Junction) |
| Howrah Division | 3rd (After Howrah & Burdwan) |
| Eastern Railway | 7th▲(+1) |
| West Bengal | 13th▲(+2) |
| India | under 120th▲(+18) |

== Revenue ==
Revenue for financial year 2025–26
| Category | Revenue (INR) | Approximate value |
|---|---|---|
| Reservation tickets – PRS | ₹32,09,80,287 | Nearly ₹32 crore |
| Unreserved tickets – UTS | ₹26,73,07,827 | Nearly ₹27 crore |
| Total | ₹58,82,88,114 | Nearly ₹59 crore |

Revenue for financial year 2024–25
| Category | Revenue (INR) | Approximate value |
|---|---|---|
| Reservation tickets – PRS | ₹30,55,14,892 | Nearly ₹31 crore |
| Unreserved tickets – UTS | ₹20,21,90,850 | Nearly ₹20 crore |
| Total | ₹50,77,05,742 | Nearly ₹51 crore |

== Platforms ==
Rampurhat Junction is equipped with six operational platforms — 1A, 1, 2, 3, 4, and 5 – which handle a significant volume of passenger and freight traffic. Among all the platforms, PF1 is the longest, measuring approximately 652 meters and PF1A is the shortest, measuring approximately 306 meters. The length of PF2 & 3 is 606 meters and of PF4 & 5 is 575 meters.

Plans are presently under consideration for the development and commissioning of Platforms 6 and 7, with the proposed expansion aimed at substantially augmenting the station's passenger-handling capacity, improving operational flexibility, and enhancing the overall efficiency of train movements and station management.

== Trains ==
Train statistics at Rampurhat Junction
| Train type with operation | Number |
|---|---|
| Halting of Mail/Express, Superfast, Passenger, MEMU | 120 |
| Originating of Mail/Express, Superfast, Passenger, MEMU | 19 |
| Terminating of Mail/Express, Superfast, Passenger, MEMU | 19 |
| Total trains | 158 |

*All trains that pass through Rampurhat have a scheduled halt at Rampurhat Junction (Except: 12343/44 Darjeeling Mail, 22301/02 Howrah–New Jalpaiguri Vande Bharat Express.)

Halting trains
| Train no. | Train name | Frequency | Type | Line used |
|---|---|---|---|---|
| 22309/22310 | Howrah–Jamalpur Vande Bharat Express | 6 days a week | Vande Bharat | Rampurhat–Dumka–Bhagalpur Junction |
| 12041/12042 | Howrah–New Jalpaiguri Shatabdi Express | 6 days a week | Shatabdi Express | Howrah–New Jalpaiguri Main line |
| 12503/12504 | Agartala–SMVT Bengaluru Humsafar Express | Biweekly | Humsafar Express | Malda Town–Rampurhat–Barddhaman |
| 16597/16598 | SMVT Bengaluru–Alipurduar Amrit Bharat Express | Weekly | Amrit Bharat Express | Malda Town–Rampurhat–Barddhaman |
| 15673/15674 | Kamakhya–Charlapalli Amrit Bharat Express | Weekly | Amrit Bharat | Malda Town–Rampurhat–Bardhaman |
| 20603/20604 | New Jalpaiguri–Nagarcoil Amrit Bharat Express | Weekly | Amrit Bharat | Malda Town–Rampurhat–Bardhaman |
| 20609/20610 | New Jalpaiguri–Tiruchirappalli Amrit Bharat Express | Weekly | Amrit Bharat | Malda Town–Rampurhat–Bardhaman |
| 13433/13434 | Malda Town–SMVT Bengaluru Amrit Bharat Express | Weekly | Amrit Bharat | Malda Town–Rampurhat–Bardhaman |
| 12551/12552 | Kamakhya–SMVT Bengaluru AC Superfast Express | Weekly | AC Superfast | Rampurhat–Sainthia Junction–Andal Junction |
| 22503/22504 | Dibrugarh–Kanniyakumari Vivek Express | Daily | Superfast | Malda Town–Rampurhat–Bardhaman |
| 12345/12346 | Saraighat Express | Daily | Superfast | Howrah–New Jalpaiguri Main line |
| 12377/12378 | Padatik Express | Daily | Superfast | Howrah–New Jalpaiguri Main line |
| 22511/22512 | Mumbai LTT–Kamakhya Karmabhoomi SF Express | Weekly | Superfast | Malda Town–Rampurhat–Bardhaman |
| 22611/22612 | MGR Chennai Central – New Jalpaiguri Superfast Express | Weekly | Superfast | Rampurhat–Sainthia Junction–Andal Junction |
| 12363/12364 | Kolkata–Haldibari Intercity Express | TriWeekly | Superfast | Howrah–New Jalpaiguri Main line |
| 12509/12510 | Kaziranga Superfast Express | TriWeekly | Superfast | Malda Town–Rampurhat–Bardhaman |
| 22501/22502 | New Tinsukia–SMVT Bengaluru Superfast Express | Weekly | Superfast | Malda Town–Rampurhat–Bardhaman |
| 17031/17032 | Agartala–Charlapalli AC Express | Weekly | AC Express | Malda Town–Rampurhat–Bardhaman |
| 15607/15608 | Aronai Express | Weekly | Mail/Express | Malda Town–Rampurhat–Bardhaman |
| 15645/15646 | Silchar–Secunderabad Express | Weekly | Mail/Express | Malda Town–Rampurhat–Bardhaman |
| 15627/15628 | Silchar–Coimbatore Express | Weekly | Mail/Express | Malda Town–Rampurhat–Bardhaman |
| 16223/16224 | Radhikapur–SMVT Bengaluru Express | Weekly | Mail/Express | Malda Town–Rampurhat–Bardhaman |
| 16523/16524 | Balurghat–SMVT Bengaluru Express | Weekly | Mail/Express | Malda Town–Rampurhat–Bardhaman |
| 13147/13148 | Uttar Banga Express | Daily | Mail/Express | Howrah–New Jalpaiguri Main line |
| 13149/13150 | Kanchan Kanya Express | Daily | Mail/Express | Howrah–New Jalpaiguri Main line |
| 13173/13174 | Sealdah–Sabroom Kanchanjungha Express | 4 days a week | Mail/Express | Howrah–New Jalpaiguri Main line |
| 13175/13176 | Sealdah–Silchar Kanchanjungha Express | TriWeekly | Mail/Express | Howrah–New Jalpaiguri Main line |
| 13403/13404 | Vananchal Express | Daily | Mail/Express | Rampurhat–Pakur–Sahibganj Junction Rampurhat–Sainthia Junction–Andal Junction |
| 13023/13024 | Howrah–Gaya Express | Daily | Mail/Express | Rampurhat–Pakur–Sahibganj Junction |
| 13153/13154 | Gour Express | Daily | Mail/Express | Malda Town–Rampurhat–Bardhaman |
| 13053/13054 | Kulik Intercity Express | Daily | Mail/Express | Malda Town–Rampurhat–Bardhaman |
| 13161/13162 | Tebhaga Express | 6 days a week | Mail/Express | Malda Town–Rampurhat–Bardhaman |
| 13071/13072 | Howrah–Jamalpur Express | Daily | Mail/Express | Rampurhat–Pakur–Sahibganj Junction |
| 13159/13160 | Kolkata–Jogbani Express | TriWeekly | Mail/Express | Malda Town–Rampurhat–Bardhaman |
| 13011/13012 | Howrah–Malda Town Intercity Express [via Rampurhat] | Daily | Mail/Express | Malda Town–Rampurhat–Bardhaman |
| 13427/13428 | Howrah–Sahibganj Intercity Express | Daily | Mail/Express | Rampurhat–Pakur–Sahibganj Junction |
| 13015/13016 | Howrah–Jamalpur Kavi Guru Express | Daily | Mail/Express | Rampurhat–Dumka–Bhagalpur Junction |
| 13027/13028 | Howrah–Azimganj Kavi Guru Express | Daily | Mail/Express | Rampurhat–Nalhati Junction–Azimganj Junction |
| 13017/13018 | Ganadevata Express | Daily | Mail/Express | Rampurhat–Nalhati Junction–Azimganj Junction |
| 15227/15228 | Muzaffarpur–SMVT Bengaluru Express | Weekly | Mail/Express | Malda Town–Rampurhat–Bardhaman |
| 13181/13182 | Kolkata–Silghat Town Kaziranga Express | Weekly | Mail/Express | Howrah–New Jalpaiguri Main line |
| 13425/13426 | Surat–Malda Town Express | Weekly | Mail/Express | Rampurhat–Sainthia Junction–Andal Junction |
| 15661/15662 | Ranchi–Kamakhya Express | Weekly | Mail/Express | Rampurhat–Sainthia Junction–Andal Junction |
| 15629/15630 | Nagaon Express | Weekly | Mail/Express | Rampurhat–Sainthia Junction–Andal Junction |
| 15639/15640 | Puri–Kamakhya Weekly Express [via Adra] | Weekly | Mail/Express | Rampurhat–Sainthia Junction–Andal Junction |
| 15929/15930 | New Tinsukia–Tambaram Express | Weekly | Mail/Express | Rampurhat–Sainthia Junction–Andal Junction |
| 13417/13418 | Digha–Malda Town Express | Weekly | Mail/Express | Rampurhat–Sainthia Junction–Andal Junction |
| 13045/13046 | Mayurakshi Express | Daily | Mail/Express | Jasidih Junction–Dumka–Rampurhat Rampurhat–Sainthia Junction–Andal Junction |
| 13031/13032 | Howrah–Jaynagar Express | Daily | Mail/Express | Rampurhat–Pakur–Sahibganj Junction |
| 63063/63064 | Bardhaman–Sahibganj MEMU | Daily | MEMU | Rampurhat–Pakur–Sahibganj Junction |
| 63141/63142 | Sealdah–Godda MEMU | Daily | MEMU | Rampurhat–Dumka–Godda |

Originating & terminating trains (daily)
| Train no. | Train name | Pairs | Type |
|---|---|---|---|
| 53047/53048 | Viswabharati Fast Passenger | – | Passenger |
| 13187/13188 | Maa Tara Express | – | Mail/Express |
| 12347/12348 | Sahid SF Express | – | Superfast |
| 63433/63434, 630-21/22,23/24,25/26,51/52 | Rampurhat–Azimganj MEMU | 5 pairs | MEMU |
| 635-81/82,83/84, 630-11/12,68/69 | Rampurhat–Bardhaman MEMU | 4 pairs | MEMU |
| 63405/63406, 63073/63074 | Rampurhat–Sahibganj MEMU | 2 pairs | MEMU |
| 63007/63008 | Rampurhat–Katwa MEMU | 1 pairs | MEMU |
| 63529/63530 | Rampurhat–Andal MEMU | 1 pairs | MEMU |
| 63081/63082 | Rampurhat–Jasidih MEMU | 1 pairs | MEMU |
| 63075/63076 | Rampurhat–Barharwa MEMU | 1 pairs | MEMU |
| 53403/53408 | Rampurhat–Jamalpur–Gaya Passenger | 1 Pairs | Passenger |

List of special trains (weekly) with limited run period
| Train no. | Train name | Operational period | Current status |
|---|---|---|---|
| 08625/08626 | Purnia Court – Ranchi Special | Up to 01/11/2025 | Revoked |
| 05951/05952 | New Tinsukia – SMVT Bengaluru Special | Up to 13/11/2025 | Revoked |
| 06559/06560 | Narangi–SMVT Bengaluru AC Express Special | Up to 29/12/2025 | Revoked |
| 03011/03012 | Howrah–ANVT Summer Special | Up to 25/05/2026 | Revoked |
| 03465/03466 | Malda Town–Digha Special | Up to 21/06/2026 | Revoked |
| 06571/06572 | Katihar–Yesvantpur Special | Up to 28/08/2026 | Revoked |
| 06565/06566 | Malda Town–SMVT Bengaluru Special | Up to 30/08/2026 | Revoked |
| 08047/08048 | Shalimar–Naharlagun Special | Up to 28/11/2026 | ACTIVE |
| 03029/03030 | Howrah–Natesar Summer Special (Tri-weekly) | Up to 29/11/2026 | ACTIVE |
| 07046/07047 | Naharlagun–Charlapalli AC Express Special | Up to 30/11/2026 | ACTIVE |

List of trains that not restored yet
| Train no. | Train name | Frequency | Type | Via |
|---|---|---|---|---|
| 12373/12374 | Sealdah–Rampurhat Intercity Express | Triweekly | Superfast | Kamarkundu–Bardhaman |
| 13013/13014 | Rampurhat–Bardhaman Express | Triweekly | Mail/Express | Bolpur (Shantiniketan) |
| 22309/22310 | Howrah–New Jalpaiguri AC Express | Weekly | AC Superfast | Bardhaman–Rampurhat–Malda Town |
| 13119/13120 | Sealdah–Anand Vihar Terminal Express | Biweekly | Mail/Express | Dakshineswar–Rampurhat–Sahibganj–Patna–Buxar–Mughalsarai–Varanasi–Lucknow |
| 13133/13134 | Sealdah–Varanasi Express | 5 days a week | Mail/Express | Dakshineswar–Rampurhat–Sahibganj–Kiul Junction–Patna– Ara-Buxar–Mughalsarai |
| 15941/15942 | Jhajha–Dibrugarh Weekly Express | Weekly | Mail/Express | Guwahati–Malda Town–Rampurhat–Durgapur–Madhupur |
| 53043/53044 | Howrah–Rajgir Fast Passenger | Daily | Passenger | Bandel–Rampurhat–Sahibganj–Kiul Junction–Mokama |
| 53417/53418 | Bardhaman–Malda Town Passenger | Daily | Passenger | Bolpur (Shantiniketan)–Rampurhat–Pakur |
| 53137/53138 | Rampurhat–Barharwa Passenger | Daily | Passenger | Pakur |

== Newly constructed track & proposals ==
The track from Dumka to Rampurhat become operational in June 2015 with single-line electrification. This development shortened the distance between Jasidih and Rampurhat by 140 km, reducing it from approximately 270 km via Asansol. The third line between Sainthia Junction and Rampurhat became operational in 2019, while the third line between Rampurhat and Murarai was completed in October 2023. The Indian Railways has approved the doubling of the 177 km long Bhagalpur Junction–Dumka–Rampurhat railway line, spanning Bihar, Jharkhand, and West Bengal, at an estimated cost of ₹3,169 crore under PM Gati Shakti National Master Plan.

| Route | Distance (in km) | Current no of tracks | Target no of tracks | Budget (in crore) | Target completion year | Current status |
|---|---|---|---|---|---|---|
| Khana–Sainthia | 71 | Double | Triple | - | 2028 | Final location survey including DPR has been sanctioned & finalized. |
| Sainthia–Rampurhat–Murarai | 58 | Triple | Quadruple | - | - | Final location survey has been sanctioned. |
| Murarai–Barharwa | 48 | Double | Triple | 935 | 2028 | Feasibility study has been done & under development. |
| Rampurhat–Dumka–Bhagalpur | 180 | Single | Double | 3169 | 2027 | Union Cabinet has approved & under development. |

=== Track speed limitation ===
The Maximum Permissible Speed (MPS) of tracks on different routes is as follows:

Khana–Rampurhat–Gumani is 110 km/h and will be upgraded to 130 km/h under FY 2025–26, while Rampurhat–Dumka-Jasidih is 100 km/h.

To upgrade the maximum permissible speed of HWH-NJP Main Line from 110kmph to 130kmph from Khana to Gumani, several track renewal works are under progress. Among them, 28% works have already been completed. 53% of works are under construction and physical progress of these works is 51% on average. Further, 19% works are yet to be started.

== Facilities ==
Major passenger amenities at Rampurhat Junction
| Category | Facility & description |
|---|---|
| Waiting & resting facilities | First class AC waiting room (₹10/hour for adults, ₹5/hour for children); Second class waiting room (non-AC); Retiring rooms (AC & Non-AC); Dormitories (Online booking via IRCTC) |
| Platform facilities & electrical equipments | All six platforms have developed with IPIS (Integrated Passenger Information System) under Phase-I works of Amrit Bharat Station Scheme; GPS-based digital clocks; Coach guidance display board (CGDB); Train information board (TIB); PC-based announcement; Platform display board (PDB); Giant digital TV screen; 2 giant GPS clock at entrance; Each platform is highly secured with 60 digital modern CCTV cameras. |
| Ticketing & reservation | Computerized reservation facility; Ticket counters: 10 total (8 unreserved, 2 reserved); 6 automatic ticket vending machines (ATVM) |
| Transport connectivity | Inter-state bus terminus (services to Dumka, Deoghar, etc.); Auto rickshaw stand (24x7 availability); 2-wheeler parking inside premises |
| Passenger convenience & services | Free Wi-Fi (by Google & RailWire); ATM counter at entrance; STD/ISD/PCO booth; Pay & use toilets (Urinal: Free; Latrine: ₹2; Bathroom: ₹5); Parcel booking points (Contacts: 29614) |
| Health & safety | Health units (Contacts: 29766, 29762, 8759656564); Medicine shop at station premises; CCTV surveillance |
| Food & retail | Food court; Tea stall; Book stall; OSOP (One Station One Product) stall – Platform 1 |
| Water & cleanliness | Water vending machines (2 on each platform); Water supply points on each 6 platform (for filling water into passenger trains); Ride-on scrubber drier machines (4 units) |
| Infrastructure & accessibility | Escalators & Lifts for all 6 platforms; 4 foot overbridges (1 under construction) |

Operational and Technical facilities at Rampurhat Junction
| Category | Facility details |
|---|---|
| Heavy machinery & emergency units | 140-ton rail crane – For major breakdowns and recovery operations; Accident relief train (ART) – Equipped for track accident situations; Accident relief medical van (ARMV) – Medical assistance on wheels; Self-propelled accident relief medical van (SPARMV) – Rapid-response medical train |
| Operational facilities | Loco shed – For stabling both diesel and electric locomotives; Coach stabling yard – For parking coaches temporarily; 2 OHE inspection cars – For routine and emergency overhead line checks; 3 dynamic tamping express (09-3X) – Used for automatic track alignment and ballast tamping |
| Crew facilities | Running room – 98* beds available (extension under construction); Crew booking kobby – For train crew scheduling and rest; *[Rampurhat Junction has not only more beds in its running room than Howrah Junction but also has the highest number of beds among all 10 running rooms under Howrah (HWH) division with an average daily occupancy of 147 and 100 beds by multiple use.] |
| Goods & freight handling | Goods train dealing points – For freight operations; 3 Indian oil tanks – For fueling goods trains (Avg. daily issue: 41 KL); Marshalling yard – Located approx. 1 km from the main junction; PSC sleeper factory – to produce & supply pre-stressed concrete sleepers across India |
| Administrative & support offices | Office of the Senior Booking Clerk – Located on platform 1; Assistant Security Commissioner Office – RPF, Rampurhat; C&W Office (Coach & Wagon) – Under construction; Area Operating Office (HWH Division) – Rampurhat station operational zone |

== Construction to get upgraded under Amrit Bharat Station Scheme ==
Rampurhat station will be transformed into a world-class station under the Amrit Bharat Station Scheme with a total budget of approximately ₹38 crore, executed in two phases and will be fully completed in 2026–27.

| Phase | Target work | Current status |
|---|---|---|
| Phase I | Widening of approach road; Development of parking area; Landscaping work; Reoriented booking office; C&W building; Upgradation of illumination arrangement; Improvement of fannage capacity; TIB, CGDB, GPS Clock; Installation of lighting signage; Extension of Running room building to increase capacity | Almost completed |
| Phase II | RCC Structural Framework; New 12 meter Foot Over bridge; New entrance (next to C&W Building); Development of facade of existing building & porch; Upgradation of existing waiting hall; Divyang amenities work | Under construction |

== Tourism ==
Rampurhat is mainly famous for its historical significance, being a major center of several ancient temples, making it a popular destination for tourists and history enthusiasts.

- Tarapith : Tarapith is a prominent destination for tourism in West Bengal, attracting a huge number of devotees throughout the year, not only from within the state but also from neighboring regions such as Bihar, Jharkhand, Odisha, Uttar Pradesh and Assam which is located just 9 km from Rampurhat railway station.Maa Tara Temple situated at Tarapith under Rampurhat Sub-division which is a prominent Tantric temple dedicated to the Goddess Tara and it is one of the 52 Shakti Peethams of India. Tarapith is also famous for Tantric saint Bamakhepa, who worshipped in the temple and resided in the cremation grounds. His ashram is also located in bank of Dwaraka river and close to the Tara Temple.A sacred place near the temple named Tarapith Maha Smashan that's known for its tantric rituals. A pink temple dedicated to Saint "Bamakhepa" is located near Maa Tara Temple. Tarapith is also surrounded by ancient legends, including the belief that the third eyeball of Sati fell there.
- Ekachakra Dham: Ekchakra Dham (Located 20 km from Rampurhat railway station and 10 km from Tarapith at Birchandrapur) holds great significance as the birthplace of Nityananda Rama, born in 1474 CE, a revered spiritual leader in the Gaudiya Vaishnava tradition known as a close companion and devoted disciple of Chaitanya Mahaprabhu, Nityananda is often celebrated alongside him as Gaura-Nitai at Nabadwip Dham. The Dham is also known for its popular attractions like Mala Tala, Hantugada Tirtha, Pandava Tala, and Bankima Raya Mandira.In Hindu tradition, it is also believed to be a place where the five Pandavas from the Mahabharata stayed during their years of exile.
- Maluti : The Maa Mauliksha Temple, located 13.8 km from Rampurhat Railway Station in Maluti, Jharkhand, is dedicated to the principal deity of the Baj Basanta Ray royal family and serves as the Guardian Goddess of Maluti.The area is home to 72 ancient temples, built as monuments to the kings of the Pala Dynasty.

Tarabitan Tourism Property, located in Rampurhat (Near Rampurhat Circuit House) and managed by the Tourism Department under Government of West Bengal (WBTDCL), is a premier 3-star tourist lodge. It provides an excellent base for exploring nearby attractions like the Tarapith Temple (approximately 9 km away) and the Nalahati Sari Temple (approximately 16 km away). Conveniently, it is just 1.5 km from Rampurhat railway station.

== Gallery ==
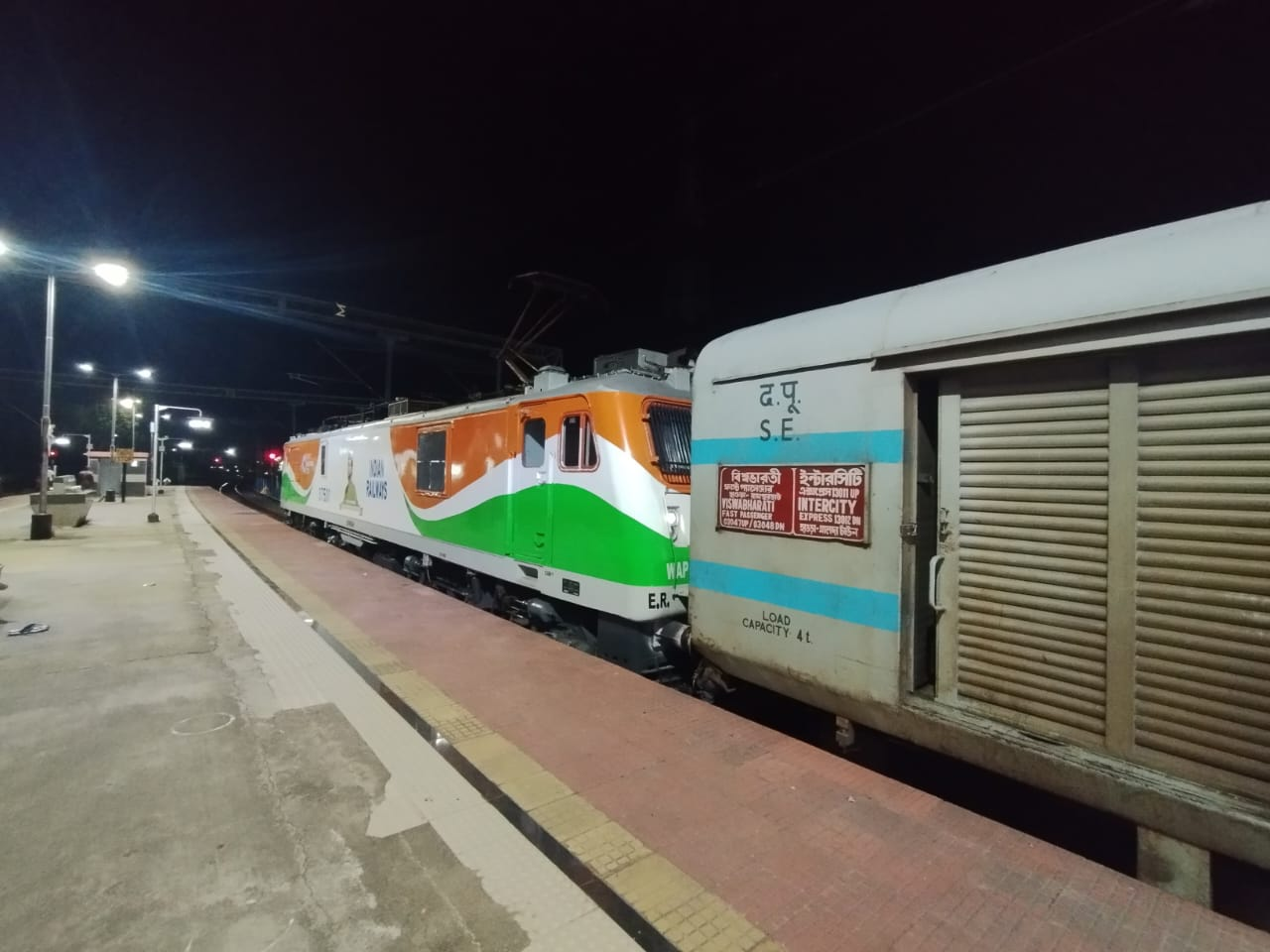
The Viswabharati Fast Passenger, led by WAP-7 locomotive 37501, at Rampurhat Junction on the special occasion of the 79th Independence Day.

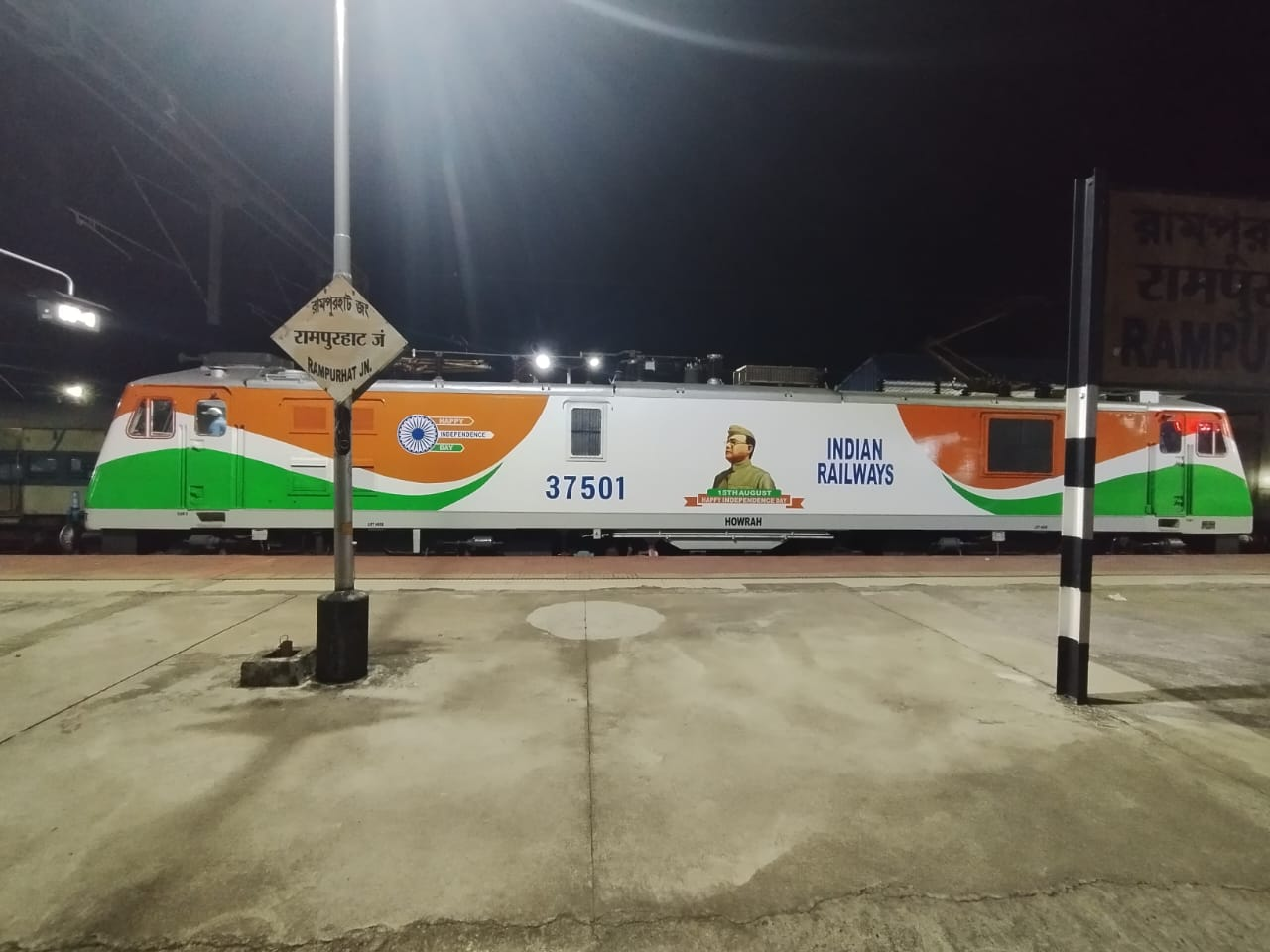
WAP-7 of Howrah, adorned with the tricolour and Netaji's portrait, hauling the Viswabharati Fast Passenger at Rampurhat Junction upon completing its journey.

== Others ==
- Nearest airports: Kazi Nazrul Islam Airport (87 km distance), Deoghar Airport (135 km distance)
- Rail enquiry: 29611, 03461 255131
- For wheelchair booking: 7595061529
- CUG number of Post In-charges : 9002022784

== See also ==
- Sealdah railway station
- Malda Town railway station
- Asansol Junction railway station
- List of railway stations in India
- Barddhaman–Rampurhat section
- Rampurhat–Malda Town section
- Rampurhat Government Medical College and Hospital
