= Patam Halt railway station =

Railway station in Bihar, India

Patam Halt

General information
- Location: Patam Munger district, Bihar; India
- Coordinates: 25°19′24″N 86°31′58″E
- Elevation: 49 m (161 ft)
- System: Passenger train station
- Owner: Indian Railways
- Operator: Eastern Railway zone
- Line: Sahibganj loop line
- Platforms: 1
- Tracks: 2

Construction
- Structure type: Standard (on ground station)

Other information
- Status: Active
- Station code: PATM
- Zone(s): Eastern Railway zone
- Division(s): Malda

History
- Former names: East Indian Railway Company

Services
Preceding station	Indian Railways	Following station
Ratanpur towards Khana	Eastern Railway zone Sahibganj loop	Jamalpur Junction towards Kiul Junction
Location

Patam Halt railway station is a halt railway station on Sahibganj loop line under the Malda railway division of Eastern Railway zone. It is situated beside Patam Road in Munger district in the Indian state of Bihar.
