= Lailakh Mamalkha railway station =

Railway station in Bihar, India

Lailakh Mamalkha

General information
- Location: National Highway 80, Baijalpur, Lailakh Mamalkha, Bhagalpur district, Bihar; India
- Coordinates: 25°13′06″N 87°06′18″E
- Elevation: 35 m (115 ft)
- System: Passenger train station
- Owner: Indian Railways
- Operator: Eastern Railway zone
- Line: Sahibganj loop line
- Platforms: 3
- Tracks: 2

Construction
- Structure type: Standard (on ground station)

Other information
- Status: Active
- Station code: LMM
- Zone(s): Eastern Railway zone
- Division(s): Malda

History
- Former names: East Indian Railway Company

Services
Preceding station	Indian Railways	Following station
Ghogha towards Khana	Eastern Railway zone Sahibganj loop	Sabaur towards Kiul Junction
Location

Lailakh Mamalkha railway station is a railway station on Sahibganj loop line under the Malda railway division of Eastern Railway zone. It is situated beside National Highway 80 At- Lailakh Mamalkha in Bhagalpur district in the Indian state of Bihar.
