= Karamtola railway station =

Railway station in Jharkhand

Karamtola

General information
- Location: National Highway 80, Teliagarih, Karamtola, Sahebganj district, Jharkhand; India
- Coordinates: 25°15′20″N 87°33′11″E
- Elevation: 35 m (115 ft)
- System: Passenger train station
- Owner: Indian Railways
- Operator: Eastern Railway zone
- Line: Sahibganj loop line
- Platforms: 2
- Tracks: 2

Construction
- Structure type: Standard (on ground station)

Other information
- Status: Active
- Station code: KRMA
- Zone(s): Eastern Railway zone
- Division(s): Malda

History
- Former names: East Indian Railway Company

Services
Preceding station	Indian Railways	Following station
Sahibganj Junction towards Khana	Eastern Railway zone Sahibganj loop	Mirza Cheuki towards Kiul Junction
Location

Karamtola railway station is a railway station on Sahibganj loop line under the Malda railway division of Eastern Railway zone. It is situated beside National Highway 80 at Teliagarih, Karamtola in Sahebganj district in the Indian state of Jharkhand.
