= Sakrigali =

Sakrigali Sakrigali Ghat
- Village
- Location in Jharkhand, India Sakrigali (India)
- Coordinates: 25.247278°N 87.715346°E
- Country: India
- State: Jharkhand
- District: Sahibganj

Population (2011)
  - Total: 1,119

Languages (*For language details see Sahibganj (community development block)#Language and religion)
  - Official: Hindi, Urdu
- Time zone: UTC+5:30 (IST)
- Telephone/ STD code: 06436
- Lok Sabha constituency: Rajmahal
- Vidhan Sabha constituency: Rajmahal
- Website: sahibganj.nic.in

Sakrigali (also known as Sakrigali Ghat/ Sakribazar/ Sakri) is a village in the Sahibganj CD block in the Sahibganj subdivision of the Sahibganj district in the Indian state of Jharkhand.

== Geography ==
Cities, towns and locations in the Sahibganj, Godda and Pakur districts in Santhal Pargana Division
M: municipality, CT: census town, R: rural/ urban centre, H: historical/ religious/ tourist centre
Owing to space constraints in the small map, the actual locations in a larger map may vary slightly

=== Location ===
Sakrigali is located at 25.247278°N 87.715346°E.

Sakribazar has an area of 10 hectares (25 acres).

=== Overview ===
The map shows a hilly area with the Rajmahal hills running from the bank of the Ganges in the extreme north to the south, beyond the area covered by the map into Dumka district. ‘Farakka’ is marked on the map and that is where Farakka Barrage is, just inside West Bengal. Rajmahal coalfield is shown in the map. The entire area is overwhelmingly rural with only small pockets of urbanisation.

Note: The full screen map is interesting. All places marked on the map are linked and you can easily move on to another page of your choice. Enlarge the map to see what else is there – one gets railway links, many more road links and so on.

== Demographics ==
According to the 2011 Census of India, Sakribazar had a total population of 1,199, of which 644 (54%) were males and 555 (46%) were females. Population in the age range 0-6 years was 297. The total number of literate persons in Sakribazar was 601 (66.63% of the population over 6 years).

== Transport ==
Sakrigali railway station is situated on the Sahibganj loop.

Before the Farakka Barrage across the Ganges was constructed, people going to the Darjeeling Hills or North Bengal from Kolkata, used to travel by broad gauge train to Sakrigali Ghat and then cross the Ganges by steamer. On the other side of the river at Manihari Ghat, they used to take a metre gauge train to Siliguri. Once Farakka Barrage became operational in 1975 (the barrage has a broad gauge rail line on it), this route became redundant.

Sahibganj Multimodal Port, with a capacity to handle 2.24 million tonnes of cargo annually, is located at Sakrigali.
