= Pirpainti =

Town in Bihar, India

- Town
- Location within Bihar Location within India
- Coordinates: 25.3242°N 87.4283°E
- Country: India
- State: Bihar
- Division: Bhagalpur
- District: Bhagalpur
- Sub-division: Kahalgaon

Government
  - Type: Nagar panchayat
  - Body: Pirpainti Nagar panchayat
- Elevation: 25 m (82 ft)

Population (2011)
  - Total: 9,021

Language
  - Official: Hindi
  - Additional official: Urdu
  - Regional: Angika
- Time zone: UTC+5:30 (IST)
- Lok Sabha constituency: Bhagalpur
- Vidhan Sabha constituency: Pirpainti

Pirpainti is a town and a notified area in the Bhagalpur district of the Indian state of Bihar. It comes under Pirpainti Block of Kahalgaon subdivision of the Bhagalpur district and is part of Pirpainti Assembly constituency. It is classified as nagar panchayat under administration.

== Etymology ==
The name in itself is composed of two terms "Pir" and "payat". "Pir" is related to saints while "payat" in local terms means sitting in group for holistic purposes.

== Geography ==
Pirpainti is located in the eastern part of Bhagalpur district, Bihar, along the southern bank of the Ganges River. The town lies at an average elevation of around 25–45 metres (82–148 ft) above sea level, with the terrain largely consisting of flat, fertile alluvial plains shaped by the river. It is bordered by Kahalgaon block to the west, Manihari in Katihar district to the east, and Mehrma and Mandro blocks in Jharkhand to the south.

Nearby towns include Bhagalpur (53 km to the west) and Kahalgaon, which is about 32 km away and serves as a local economic hub.

== Demographics ==
As of 2011 Indian Census, Pirpainti had a total population of 9021, of which 4,786 were males and 4,235 were females. Population within the age group of 0 to 6 years was 1,774. Average sex ratio of Pirpainti village is 885 which is lower than Bihar state average of 918. Child sex ratio for the Pirpainti as per census is 993, higher than Bihar average of 935. The total number of literates in Pirpainti was 3791, which constituted 42.02%. The effective literacy rate of 7+ population of Pirpainti was 52.31%. The Scheduled Castes and Scheduled Tribes population was 62 and 54 respectively. Pirpainti had 1,635 households in 2011.

Literacy Rate	52.31%				
Total Working Population	30.45%				
Main Working Population	33.99%				
Marginal Working Population	63.01%				
Total Population	9021	Total male	4786	Total female	4235

== Transport ==
Pirpainti railway station is situated on Sahibganj Loop of the Malda railway division.
