= LKB (disambiguation) =

LKB may refer to:

- LKB, a free and open source grammar engineering environment
- lkb, the ISO 639-3 code for Kabras, a variant of Luhya language
- Lakeba Airport, the IATA code LKB
- Ljubljanska kreditna banka, a significant joint-stock bank headquartered in Ljubljana
- Königsborn station, the DS100 code LKB
- Lakshmipur Bhorang railway station, the station code LKB
