= Shivnarayanpur =

Mathurapur
- Small town
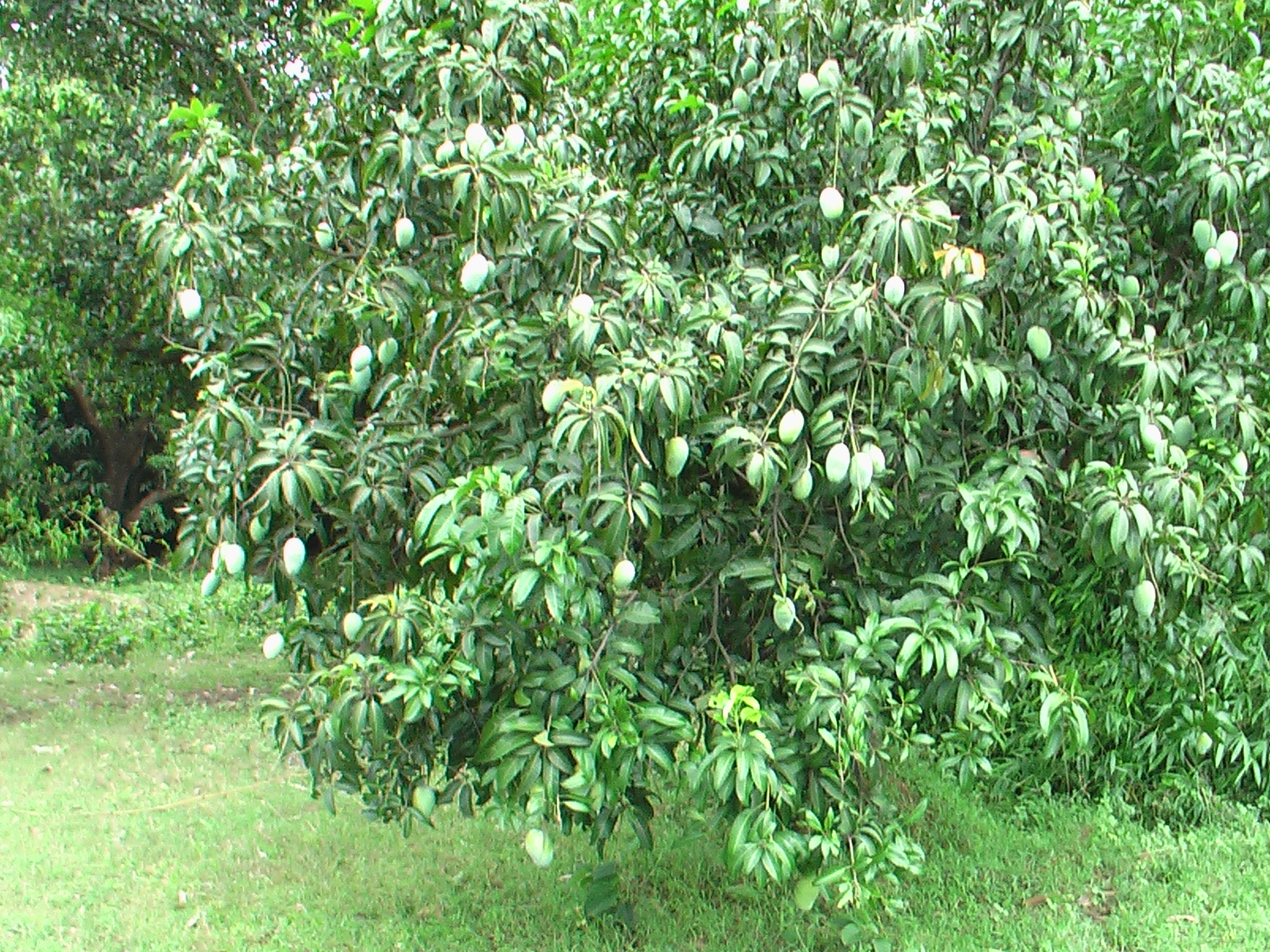

- Location within Bihar Location within India
- Coordinates: 25°17′42″N 87°20′00″E
- Country: India
- State: Bihar
- District: Bhagalpur
- Block: Kahalgaon

Population (2011)
  - Total: 7,873

Language
  - Official: Hindi
  - Additional official: Urdu
  - Regional: Angika
- Time zone: UTC+5:30 (IST)
- Lok Sabha constituency: Bhagalpur
- Vidhan Sabha constituency: Pirpainti

Shivnarayanpur or Mathurapur is a small town in the Kahalgaon block and under Pirpainti Vidhansabha seat of Bhagalpur district of Bihar, India.

== History ==
Traditionally, the village is known as Mathurapur. The name Shivnarayanpur came after the name of late Shivnarayan Ram who donated his land for Shivanarayanpur railway station and Shivnarayanpur hattya. It is also one of the biggest and oldest mandis for agriculture produce (mainly vegetables, pulses and jaggery) in Bihar. Vikramshila, which is a national heritage site maintained by Archeological Survey of India is situated near Shivnarayanpur. The Ganga ghat known as Bateishwernath is also situated near this village.

== Transport ==
Shivanarayanpur railway station is situated on Sahibganj Loop line under the Malda railway division.

== See also ==
- Kahalgaon
- Bhagalpur
- Vikramshila
