= Sabaur railway station =

Railway station in Bihar

Sabaur
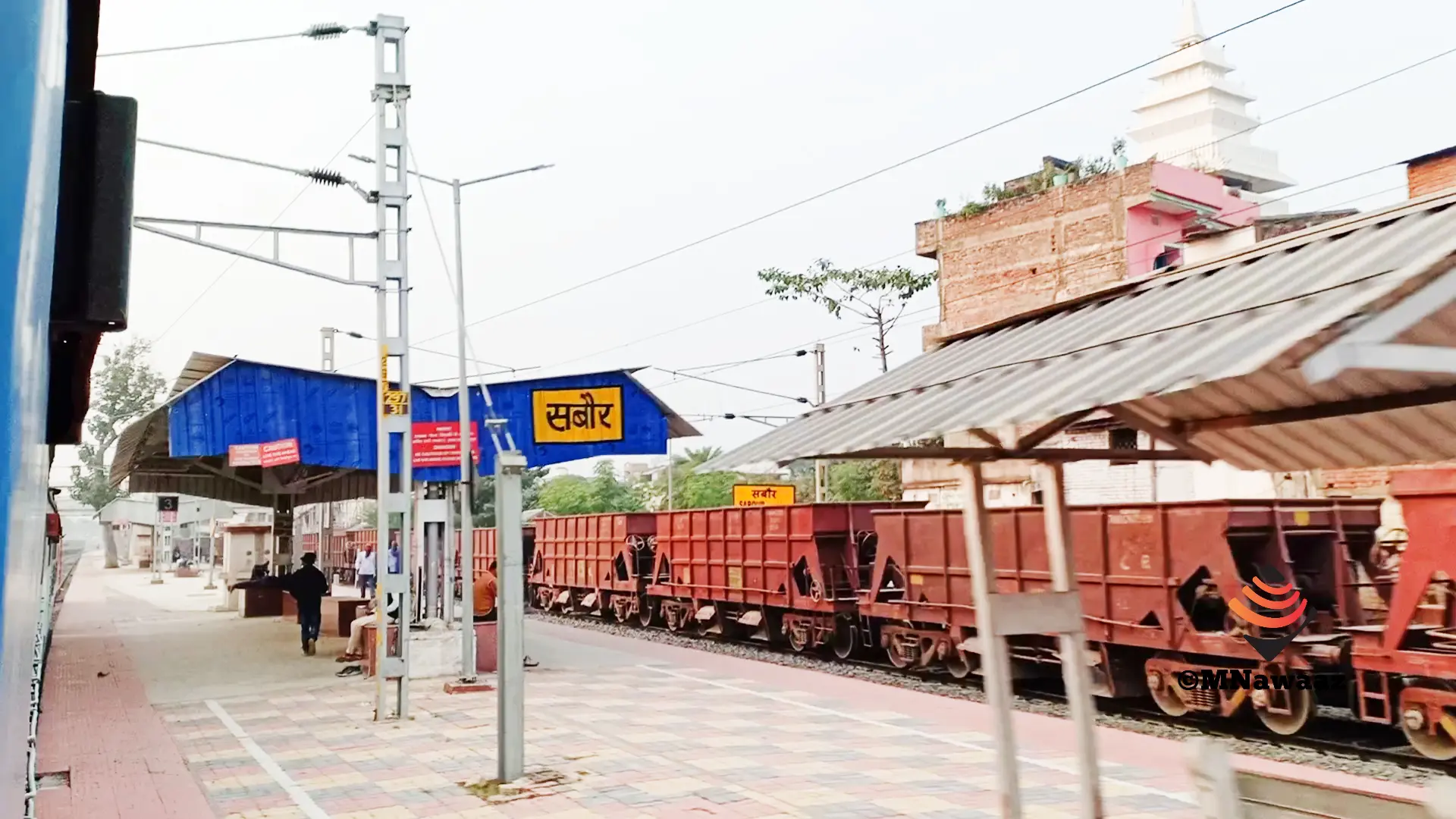

General information
- Location: Patel Nagar Road, Sabaur, Bhagalpur, Bhagalpur district, Bihar; India
- Coordinates: 25°14′21″N 87°02′45″E
- Elevation: 41 m (135 ft)
- System: Passenger train station
- Owner: Indian Railways
- Operator: Eastern Railway zone
- Line: Sahibganj loop line
- Platforms: 4
- Tracks: 4

Construction
- Structure type: Standard (on ground station)

Other information
- Status: Active
- Station code: SBO
- Zone(s): Eastern Railway zone
- Division(s): Malda

Services
Preceding station	Indian Railways	Following station
Lailakh Mamalkha towards Khana	Eastern Railway zone Sahibganj loop	Bhagalpur Junction towards Kiul Junction
Location

Sabaur railway station is a railway station on Sahibganj loop line under the Malda railway division of Eastern Railway zone.It serving Bhagalpur city in the Indian state of Bihar. The Sabour railway station is connected to most of the major cities in India by the railway network.
