= Mirza Cheuki railway station =

Railway station in Jharkhand

Mirza Cheuki

General information
- Location: National Highway 80, Mirza Cheuki, Sahebganj district, Jharkhand; India
- Coordinates: 25°15′32″N 87°29′53″E
- Elevation: 39 m (128 ft)
- System: Passenger train station
- Owner: Indian Railways
- Operator: Eastern Railway zone
- Line: Sahibganj loop line
- Platforms: 3
- Tracks: 3

Construction
- Structure type: Standard (on ground station)

Other information
- Status: Active
- Station code: MZC
- Zone(s): Eastern Railway zone
- Division(s): Malda

History
- Former names: East Indian Railway Company

Services
Preceding station	Indian Railways	Following station
Karamtola towards Khana	Eastern Railway zone Sahibganj loop	Ammapali towards Kiul Junction
Location

Mirza Cheuki railway station is a railway station on Sahibganj loop line under the Malda railway division of Eastern Railway zone. It is situated beside National Highway 80 at Mirza Cheuki in Sahebganj district in the Indian state of Jharkhand.
