= Sealdah–Varanasi Express =

Train in India

Overview
- Service type: Express
- First service: 1 December 1905; 120 years ago
- Last service: 6 November 2020 (Discontinued due to COVID)
- Current operator: Eastern Railway

Route
- Termini: Sealdah (SDAH); Varanasi Junction (BSB)
- Stops: 33
- Distance travelled: 693 km (431 mi)
- Average journey time: 24 hrs 25 mins
- Service frequency: Daily. (Note: Runs seven days in a week for every direction.)
- Train number: 13133 / 13134

On-board services
- Classes: AC 2 Tier, AC 3 Tier, Sleeper Class, General Unreserved
- Seating arrangements: No
- Sleeping arrangements: Yes
- Catering facilities: On-board catering, E-catering
- Observation facilities: Large windows
- Baggage facilities: No
- Other facilities: Below the seats

Technical
- Rolling stock: ICF coach
- Track gauge: 1,676 mm (5 ft 6 in)
- Operating speed: 37 km/h (23 mph) average including halts.

The 13133 / 13134 Sealdah–Varanasi Express was an express train belonging to Eastern Railway zone that runed between Sealdah and Varanasi Junction in India via Rampurhat, Sahibganj, Bhagalpur. It is currently Not operating and cancelled. Before cancel, It runs from Varanasi on Monday, Tuesday, Thursday, Friday & Saturday and from Sealdah on Monday, Tuesday, Wednesday, Friday & Saturday.

== Service ==
The 13133/Sealdah–Varanasi (Upper India) Express had an average speed of 36 km/h and covers 872 km in 24h 25m. 13134/Varanasi–Sealdah (Upper India) Express had an average speed of 33 km/h and covers 872 km in 26h 15m.

== Route and halts ==
The important halts of the train are:

- Sealdah
- Bidhannagar Road
- Barddhaman Junction
- Bolpur Shantiniketan
- Rampurhat Junction
- Barharwa Junction
- Sahibganj Junction
- Bhagalpur Junction
- Jamalpur Junction
- Kiul Junction
- Lakhisarai Junction
- Barh
- Bakhtiyarpur Junction
- Patna Sahib
- Gulzarbagh
- Rajendra Nagar Terminal
- Patna Junction
- Phulwari Sharif
- Danapur
- Ara Junction
- Buxar
- Dildarnagar Junction
- Zamania
- Mughalsarai Junction
- Varanasi Junction

Note: Bold letters indicates Major Railway Stations/Major Cities.

== Coach composition ==
The train had standard LCF rakes with a maximum speed of 110 km/h. The train consists of 16 coaches :

- 2 AC III Tier
- 6 Sleeper coaches
- 6 General
- 2 Seating cum Luggage Rake

== Traction ==
Both trains were hauled by a Barddhaman Loco Shed-based WDM-3A diesel locomotive from Sealdah to Varanasi and vice versa.

== See also ==
- Varanasi Junction railway station
- Sealdah railway station
