= Ekchari railway station =

Railway station in Bihar, India

Ekchari

General information
- Location: National Highway 80, Ekchari, Bhagalpur district, Bihar; India
- Coordinates: 25°13′39″N 87°12′50″E
- Elevation: 35 m (115 ft)
- System: Passenger train station
- Owner: Indian Railways
- Operator: Eastern Railway zone
- Line: Sahibganj loop line
- Platforms: 2
- Tracks: 2

Construction
- Structure type: Standard (on ground station)

Other information
- Status: Active
- Station code: EKC
- Zone(s): Eastern Railway zone
- Division(s): Malda

History
- Former names: East Indian Railway Company

Services
Preceding station	Indian Railways	Following station
Kahalgaon towards Khana	Eastern Railway zone Sahibganj loop	Ghogha towards Kiul Junction
Location

Ekchari railway station is a railway station on Sahibganj loop line under the Malda railway division of Eastern Railway zone. It is situated beside National Highway 80 at Ekchari in Bhagalpur district in the Indian state of Bihar.
