= Pakur railway station =

Railway station in Jharkhand

Pakur
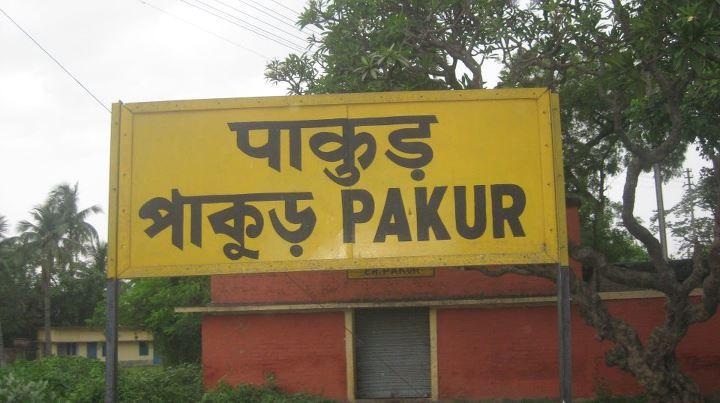

General information
- Location: Gandhi Chowk, Tantipara, Pakur; India
- Coordinates: 24°38′16″N 87°51′21″E
- Elevation: 38 m (125 ft)
- System: Indian Railways station
- Owner: Indian Railways
- Lines: Howrah-New Jalpaiguri Main Line; Rampurhat-Malda Town Section
- Platforms: 3

Construction
- Structure type: At grade
- Parking: Available

Other information
- Status: Functioning
- Station code: PKR
- Zone(s): Eastern Railway
- Division(s): Howrah

History
- Opened: 1851–56
- Former names: East India Railway
Location

Pakur railway station (code:PKR) is an important station on the Rampurhat-Malda Town section, located in Pakur, Jharkhand, India. There is a General and a First Class Waiting Room for the passengers. The railway line on the western side leads to a freight yard, which consists of BOXNHL and BOBYN freight rakes. A rail loco shed is also available at the freight yard.

== Trains ==
Major Trains available from this railway station are as follows:

- Sealdah-Alipurduar Kanchan Kanya Express
- Sealdah-Bamanhat Uttar Banga Express
- Sealdah–Silchar Kanchenjunga Express
- Sealdah–Sabroom Kanchanjunga Express
- Sealdah - Malda Town Gour Express
- Mumbai-Kamakhya Karmabhoomi Express
- Tiruvananthapuram-Silchar Aronai Superfast Express
- Silchar- Coimbatore Superfast Express
- Silghat Town-Tambaram Nagaon Express
- Dibrugarh–Tambaram Superfast Express
- Ranchi–Kamakhya Express
- Puri Kamakhya Express
- Howrah–Jamalpur Express
- Howrah–Gaya Express
- Kolkata–Jogbani Express
- Surat–Malda Town Express
- Ranchi Bhagalpur Vananchal Express
- Digha–Malda Town Express
- Kolkata-Balurghat Tebhaga Express
- Kolkata–Haldibari Intercity Express
- Howrah-Radhikapur Kulik Express
- Yesvantpur–Muzaffarpur Weekly Express

== Electrification ==
The station is electrified. The electrification of this section was sanctioned in the rail budget 2012–13. Both the platforms are connected via two railway foot overbridges (FOBs). Some of the passenger and freight train is currently using the ELocos.

== See also ==
- Rampurhat Junction railway station
- Malda Town Station
- List of railway stations in India

Pakur
Next station west: Tilbhita	Indian Railways : Sahibganj loop			Next station east: Nagarnabi
Next station west: Tilbhita	Stop no. 48	km from start 0	Platforms 2	Next station east: Nagarnabi
