= Ratanpur railway station =

Railway station in Bihar, India

Ratanpur
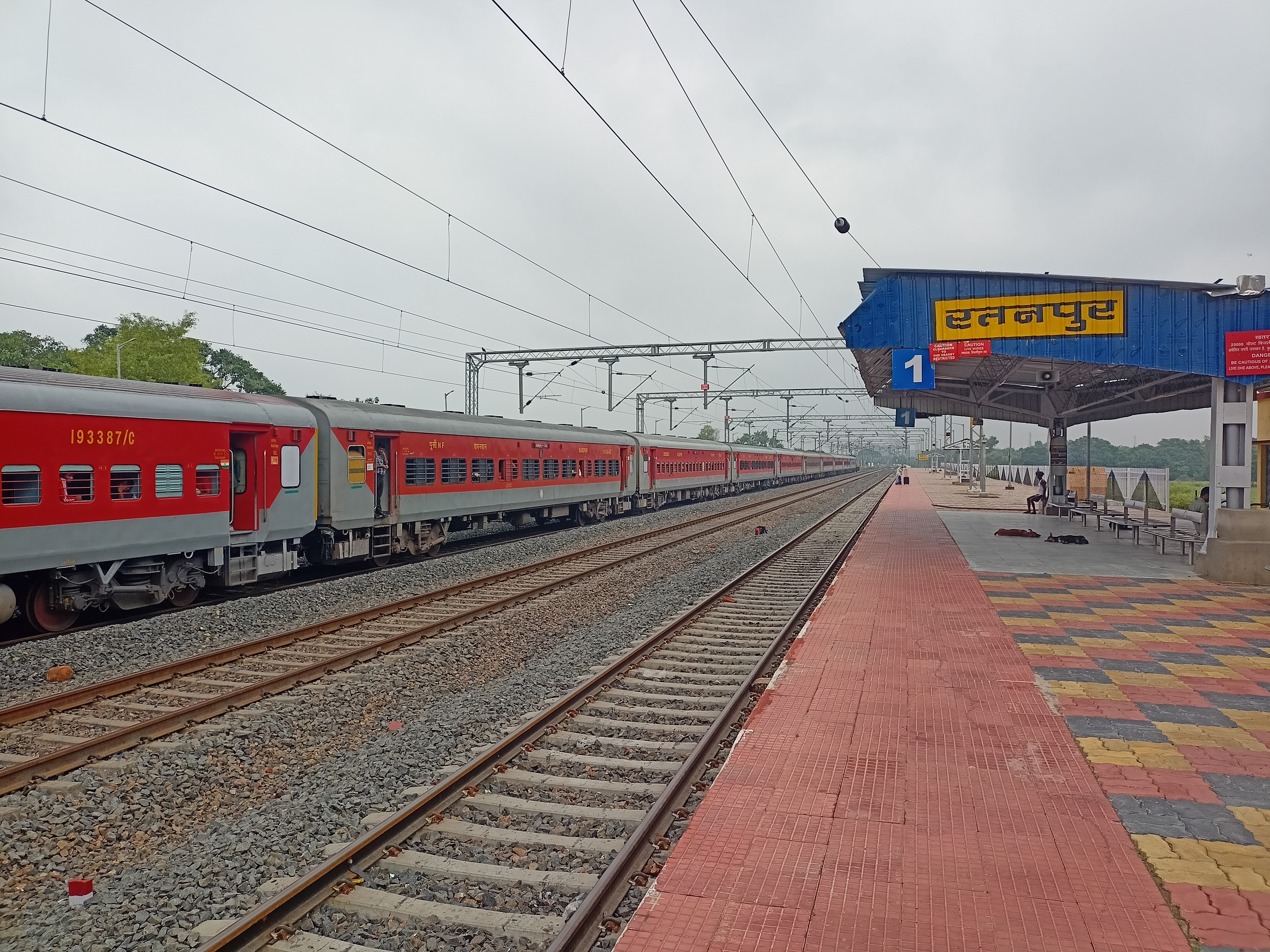
- Bhramaputra mail stopping at Ratanpur Railway Station

General information
- Location: Ithari, Ratanpur, Munger district, Bihar; India
- Coordinates: 25°18′52″N 86°32′32″E
- Elevation: 46 m (151 ft)
- System: Passenger train station
- Owner: Indian Railways
- Operator: Eastern Railway zone
- Line: Sahibganj loop line
- Platforms: 2
- Tracks: 4

Construction
- Structure type: Standard (on ground station)
- Parking: available

Other information
- Status: Active
- Station code: RPUR
- Zone(s): Eastern Railway zone
- Division(s): Malda

History
- Electrified: 2018
- Former names: East Indian Railway Company

Services
| Preceding station | Indian Railways | Following station |
|---|---|---|
| Rishikund Halt (towards Jamalpur junction) towards Khana | Eastern Railway zone Sahibganj loop | Patam Halt (towards Bariarpur) towards Kiul Junction |
Location

Ratanpur railway station is a railway station on Sahibganj loop line under the Malda railway division of Eastern Railway zone. It is situated at Itahari, Ratanpur in Munger district in the Indian state of Bihar.

== Lines ==
Traveling south-west, Kiul Junction railway station is the main station next to Jamalpur. Going east, Bhagalpur Junction is the nearest main station. A mega Munger Ganga Bridge connects it to nearby districts like Begusarai, Khagaria and various districts of North Bihar .
