= Lakshmipur Bhorang railway station =

Railway station in Bihar, India

Lakshmipur Bhorang

General information
- Location: National Highway 80, Khidarpur, Lakshmipur Bhorang, Bhagalpur district, Bihar; India
- Coordinates: 25°17′18″N 87°21′48″E
- Elevation: 40 m (130 ft)
- System: Passenger train station
- Owner: Indian Railways
- Operator: Eastern Railway zone
- Line: Sahibganj loop line
- Platforms: 2
- Tracks: 2

Construction
- Structure type: Standard (on ground station)

Other information
- Status: Active
- Station code: LKB
- Zone(s): Eastern Railway zone
- Division(s): Malda

History
- Former names: East Indian Railway Company

Services
Preceding station	Indian Railways	Following station
Pirpainti towards Khana	Eastern Railway zone Sahibganj loop	Shivanarayanpur towards Kiul Junction
Location

Lakshmipur Bhorang railway station is an Indian railway station on Sahibganj loop line under the Malda railway division of Eastern Railway zone. It is situated beside National Highway 80 at Khidarpur, Lakshmipur Bhorang in Bhagalpur district in the Indian state of Bihar.
