= Shivanarayanpur railway station =

Railway station in Bihar, India

Shivanarayanpur

General information
- Location: National Highway 80, Mathurapur, Shivnarayanpur, Bhagalpur district, Bihar; India
- Coordinates: 25°17′41″N 87°19′58″E
- Elevation: 47 m (154 ft)
- System: Passenger train station
- Owner: Indian Railways
- Operator: Eastern Railway zone
- Line: Sahibganj loop line
- Platforms: 3
- Tracks: 6

Construction
- Structure type: Standard (on ground station)

Other information
- Status: Active
- Station code: SVRP
- Zone(s): Eastern Railway zone
- Division(s): Malda

History
- Former names: East Indian Railway Company

Services
Preceding station	Indian Railways	Following station
Lakshmipur Bhorang towards Khana	Eastern Railway zone Sahibganj loop	Bikramshila towards Kiul Junction
Location

Shivanarayanpur railway station is a railway station on Sahibganj loop line under the Malda railway division of Eastern Railway zone. It is situated beside National Highway 80 at Mathurapur, Shivnarayanpur in Bhagalpur district in the Indian state of Bihar.

== History ==
23 Acer of land has been donated by Late Shivnarayan Rama who was landlord of Maturapur village and the Railway station was named after him.
