= Purabsarai railway station =

Railway station in Munger, Bihar, India

Coordinates: 25.3701°N 86.4853°E

General information
- Location: Munger, Bihar; India
- Elevation: 49 m (161 ft)
- System: Indian Railways station
- Owner: Indian Railways
- Line: Jamalpur Junction–Sahebpur Kamal line
- Platforms: 1 BG
- Tracks: 1 BG
- Connections: Taxi stand, auto stand

Construction
- Structure type: Standard (on-ground station)
- Parking: Available
- Cycle facilities: Available
- Accessible: Disabled access

Other information
- Station code: PBS
- Fare zone: Eastern Railways

History
- Closed: 2016
Location
- Location within India Location within Bihar

Purabsarai railway station (station code: PBS) was the railway station serving the Munger–Jamalpur twin cities in the Munger district in the Indian state of Bihar. Jamalpur Junction is the main rail head for the Munger city while Purabsarai railway station act as suburban railway station connecting Jamalpur to the city. As of November 2016, no trains are scheduled here. It has one platform.

== See also ==
- Jamalpur
- Munger
