= Gumani railway station =

Railway station in Jharkhand, India

Gumani
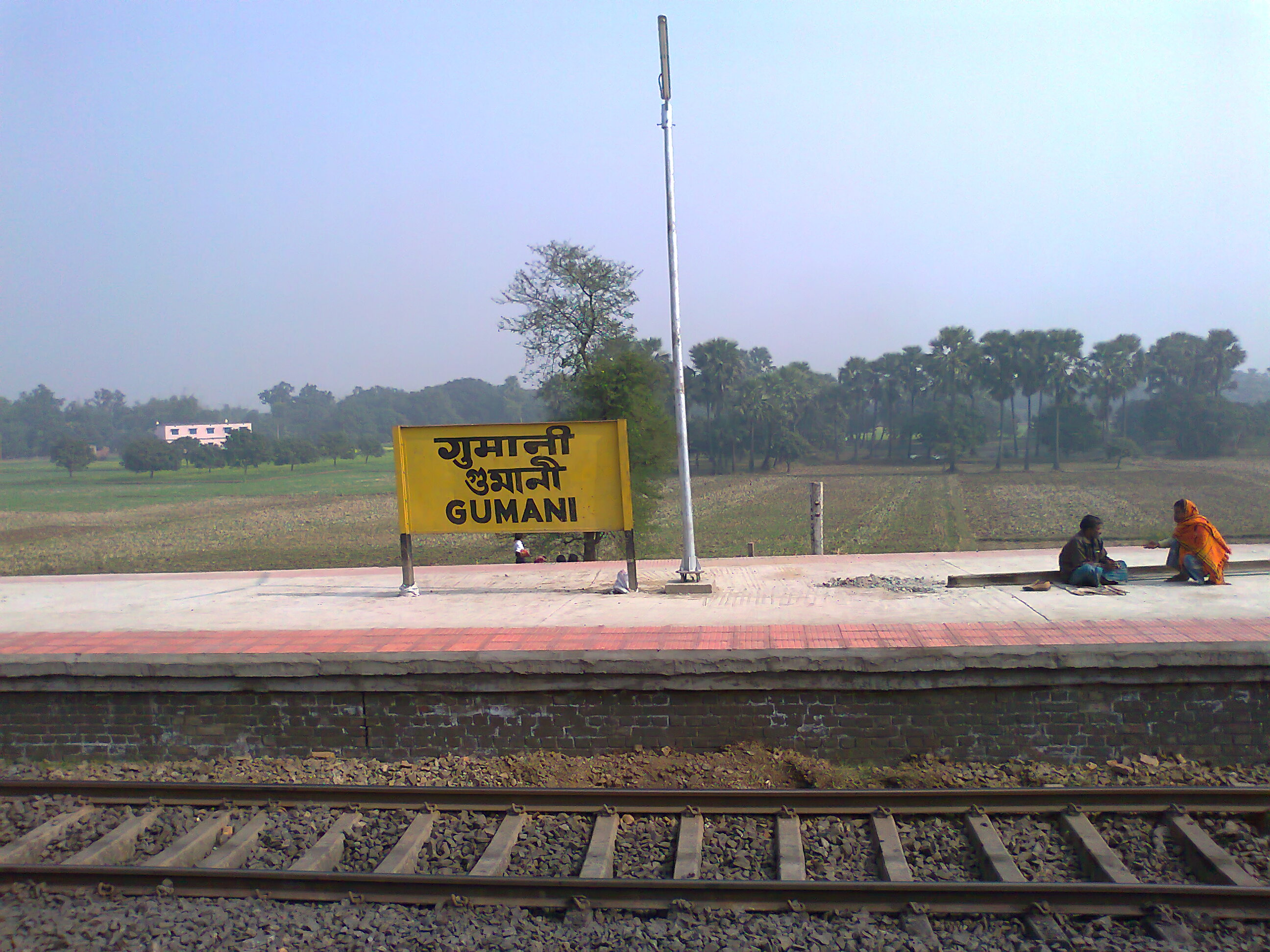

General information
- Location: Gumani, Jharkhand; India
- Coordinates: 24°47′57″N 87°48′19″E
- Elevation: 30 m
- System: Indian Railways station
- Owner: Indian Railways
- Line: Rampurhat-Malda Town Section
- Platforms: 3
- Tracks: 4

Construction
- Structure type: Standard

Other information
- Station code: GMAN
- Zone(s): Eastern Railways
- Division(s): Howrah

History
- Former names: East India Railway
Location

Gumani railway station is a railway station on the Rampurhat-Malda Town section, located in the town of Gumani in Sahebganj district of Jharkhand. This station is under construction and soon will be developed.

Gumani
Next station west: Barharwa Junction	Indian Railways : Sahibganj loop			Next station east: Kotalpokhar
Next station west: Barharwa Junction	Stop no. 45	km from start 0	Platforms 3	Next station east: Kotalpokhar
