= Pirpainti railway station =

Railway station in Bihar, India

Pirpainti

General information
- Location: National Highway 80, Shermari Bazaar, Pirpainti, Bhagalpur district, Bihar; India
- Coordinates: 25°17′25″N 87°25′19″E
- Elevation: 53 m (174 ft)
- Owner: Indian Railways
- Operator: Eastern Railway zone
- Line: Sahibganj loop line
- Platforms: 2
- Tracks: 2

Construction
- Structure type: Standard (on ground station)

Other information
- Status: Active
- Station code: PPT
- Zone(s): Eastern Railway zone
- Division(s): Malda

History
- Former names: East Indian Railway Company

Services
Preceding station	Indian Railways	Following station
Ammapali towards Khana	Eastern Railway zone Sahibganj loop	Lakshmipur Bhorang towards Kiul Junction
Location

Pirpainti railway station is a railway station on Sahibganj loop line under the Malda railway division of Eastern Railway zone. It is situated beside National Highway 80 at Shermari Bazaar, Pirpainti in Bhagalpur district in the Indian state of Bihar.

== Redevelopment ==
Indian Railways carried out this project under the Amrit Bharat Station Scheme (ABSS) Phase-1 with a total investment of approximately ₹18.93 crore. It became a NSG‑5 station under the Eastern Railway’s Malda Railway division, serving as a major regional hub.

=== Key Infrastructure & Passenger Amenities ===
- A 12 m-wide Foot Over Bridge with roof plaza. Separate, well-planned arrival and departure blocks as well as Modern civil and electrical works, plus updated signalling & telecom systems.
- New first- & second-class waiting halls, an executive lounge, reserved lounge, and a ladies' waiting room. A redesigned concourse enlarged circulating area, and a modernized arrival block.

=== Formal Inauguration ===
On 22 May 2025, Prime Minister Narendra Modi virtually inaugurated Pirpainti, along with Thawe Junction in Gopalganj. These were part of a national rollout of 103 redeveloped stations under ABSS.
