= Sakrigali railway station =

Railway station in Jharkhand, India

Sakrigali

General information
- Location: Chhota Bhagiamariand Partaba, Sakrigali, Sahebganj district, Jharkhand; India
- Coordinates: 25°14′36″N 87°42′57″E
- Elevation: 45 m (148 ft)
- System: Passenger train station
- Owner: Indian Railways
- Operator: Eastern Railway zone
- Line: Rampurhat-Sahibganj Section
- Platforms: 3
- Tracks: 2

Construction
- Structure type: Standard (on ground station)

Other information
- Status: Active
- Station code: SLJ
- Zone(s): Eastern Railway zone
- Division(s): Malda

History
- Former names: East Indian Railway Company

Services
| Preceding station | Indian Railways | Following station |
|---|---|---|
| Maharajpur towards Khana | Eastern Railway zone Sahibganj loop | Sahibganj Junction towards Kiul Junction |
Location

Sakrigali railway station is a railway station on the Rampurhat-Sahibganj section under the Malda railway division of Eastern Railway zone. It is situated at Chhota Bhagiamariand Partaba, Sakrigali in Sahebganj district in the Indian state of Jharkhand.
