= Bolpur Shantiniketan railway station =

Railway Station in West Bengal, India

Bolpur Shantiniketan
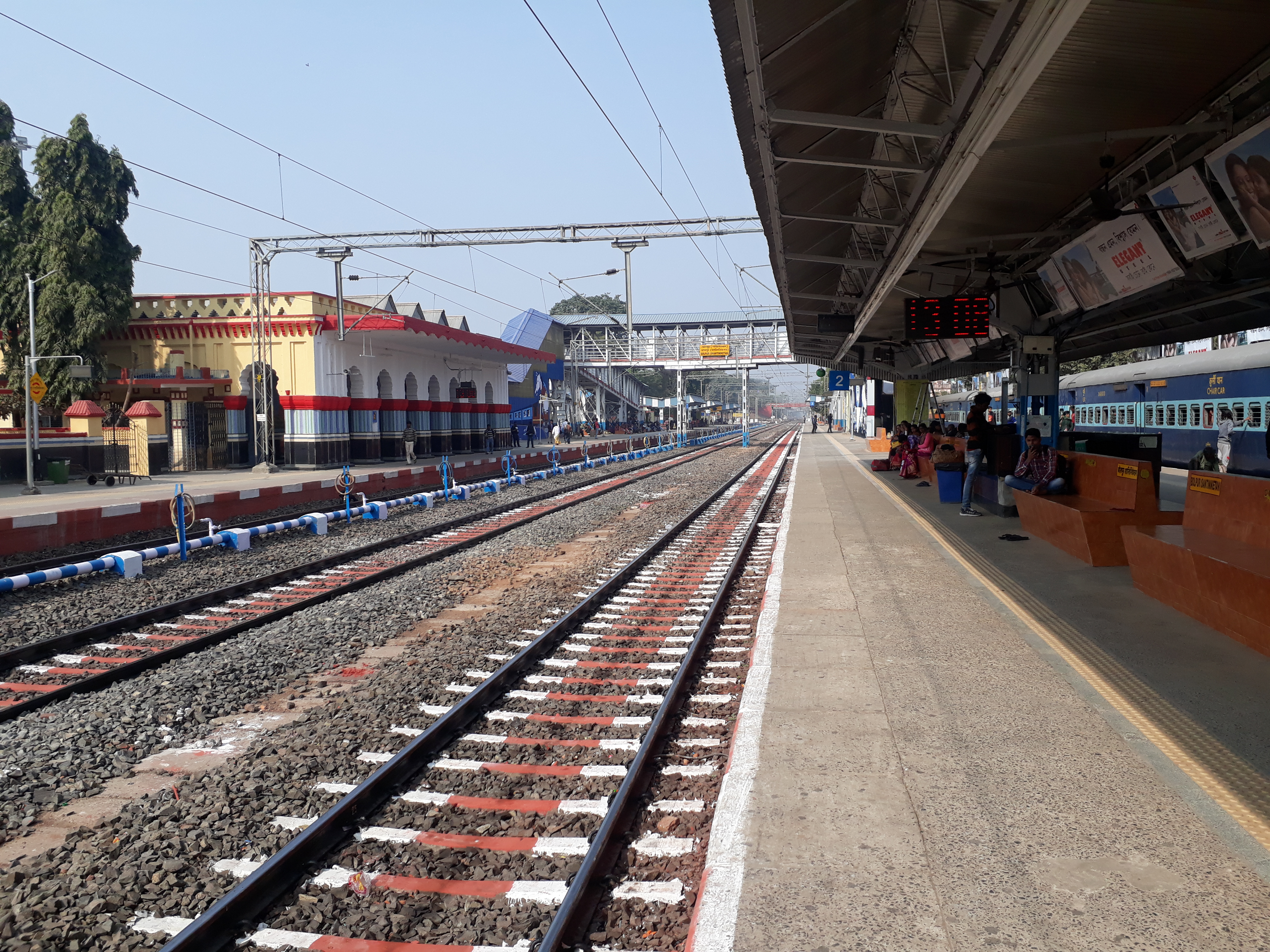

General information
- Location: Station Road, Santiniketan; Bolpur; India
- Coordinates: 23.657804°N 87.698136°E
- Elevation: 55 metres (180 ft)
- System: Indian Railways
- Owner: Indian Railways
- Lines: Howrah-New Jalpaiguri Main Line; Bardhaman-Rampurhat section; Bolpur-Prantik-Siuri line(planned)
- Platforms: 3
- Tracks: 4
- Connections: Auto rickshaw, E-rickshaw, Cabs, Bus

Construction
- Structure type: At grade
- Parking: Available
- Cycle facilities: Available
- Accessible: Available

Other information
- Status: Double-Line Electrification
- Station code: BHP
- Zone(s): Eastern Railway
- Division(s): Howrah

History
- Opened: 1860; 166 years ago
- Electrified: 2016; 10 years ago

Passengers
- FY 2020-2021: 2,04,932
Route map
Location
- Location within West Bengal Location within India

Bolpur Shantiniketan railway station is a major railway station on the Bardhaman-Rampurhat Section in Birbhum district, West Bengal. Its code is BHP. It serves Bolpur City and Shantiniketan. The station consists of three platforms.

== Trains ==
Some of the major trains that passes from the Bolpur railway station are as follows:

- Howrah–New Jalpaiguri Vande Bharat Express
- Howrah–Jamalpur Vande Bharat Express
- New Jalpaiguri–Howrah Shatabdi Express
- SMVT Bengaluru–Alipurduar Amrit Bharat Express
- Nagercoil–New Jalpaiguri Amrit Bharat Express
- Tiruchchirappalli–New Jalpaiguri Amrit Bharat Express
- Charlapalli–Kamakhya Amrit Bharat Express
- Malda Town–SMVT Bengaluru Amrit Bharat Express
- Sealdah - Haldibari Superfast Darjeeling Mail
- Sealdah - New Alipurduar Padatik Superfast Express
- Howrah - Guwahati Saraighat Super-fast Express
- Sealdah - Alipurduar Kanchan Kanya Express
- Sealdah–Silchar Kanchanjunga Express
- Sealdah–Agartala Kanchanjunga Express
- Silchar-Coimbatore Superfast Express
- Tiruvananthapuram-Silchar Aronai Superfast Express
- Silchar–Secunderabad Express
- Lokmanya Tilak Terminus - Kamakhya Karmabhoomi Express
- Guwahati - Sir M. Visvesvaraya Terminal Kaziranga Superfast Express
- Sir M. Visvesvaraya Terminal - New Tinsukia Superfast Express
- Kolkata–Silghat Town Kaziranga Express
- Howrah–Rampurhat Express
- Howrah–Bhagalpur Kavi Guru Express
- Sealdah–Rampurhat Intercity Express
- Howrah–Gaya Express
- Sealdah-Malda Town Gour Express
- Kolkata-Balurghat Tebhaga Express
- Barddhaman–Rampurhat Express
- Sealdah–Varanasi Express
- Howrah–Jamalpur Express
- Kolkata–Jogbani Express
- Sealdah-Rampurhat Maa Taara Express
- Sealdah-Bamanhat Uttar Banga Express
- Kolkata–Haldibari Intercity Express
- Howrah - Azimganj Ganadevata Express
- Howrah-Radhikapur Kulik Express
- Howrah-Bolpur Shantiniketan Express
- Yesvantpur-Muzaffarpur Express
- Howrah–Jamalpur Express
- Howrah–Malda Town Intercity Express
- Howrah–Sahibganj Intercity Express
- Howrah–Gaya Express

== Incidents ==
On 1 August 2024 6:00 PM - 2 August 5:00 AM IST all the platforms of Bolpur Junction's railway tracks got submerged under water due to constant heavy rain.

== Facilities ==
The station has all important facilities like reservation counter (8 am to 8 pm), two and four wheeler parking, resting room, railway canteen (Jan Aahar). The station has escalators for going through the platforms.
