= Kahalgaon railway station =

Railway station in Bihar, India

Kahalgaon
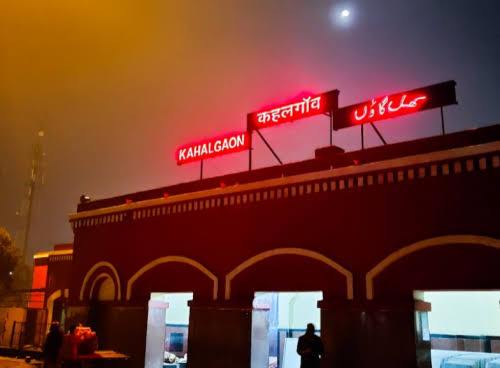

General information
- Location: National Highway 80, Kahalgaon City, Bhagalpur district, Bihar; India
- Coordinates: 25°15′44″N 87°14′02″E
- Elevation: 44 m (144 ft)
- System: Railway station
- Owner: Indian Railways
- Operator: Eastern Railway zone
- Line: Sahibganj loop line
- Platforms: 2
- Tracks: 4

Construction
- Structure type: At grade

Other information
- Status: Active
- Station code: CLG
- Zone(s): Eastern Railway
- Division(s): Malda

History
- Opened: 1866; 160 years ago
- Former names: East Indian Railway Company

Services
Preceding station	Indian Railways	Following station
Bikramshila towards Khana	Eastern Railway zone Sahibganj loop	Ekchari towards Kiul Junction
Location

Kahalgaon Railway Station (station code: Clg), is a railway station on Sahibganj loop line under the Malda railway division of Eastern Railway zone. It serves Kahalgaon City of Bhagalpur district in the Indian state of Bihar.The Kahalgaon railway station is connected to most of the major cities in India by the railway network.
