= Jamalpur Junction railway station =

Railway station in Munger, Bihar, India

JAMALPUR JUNCTION

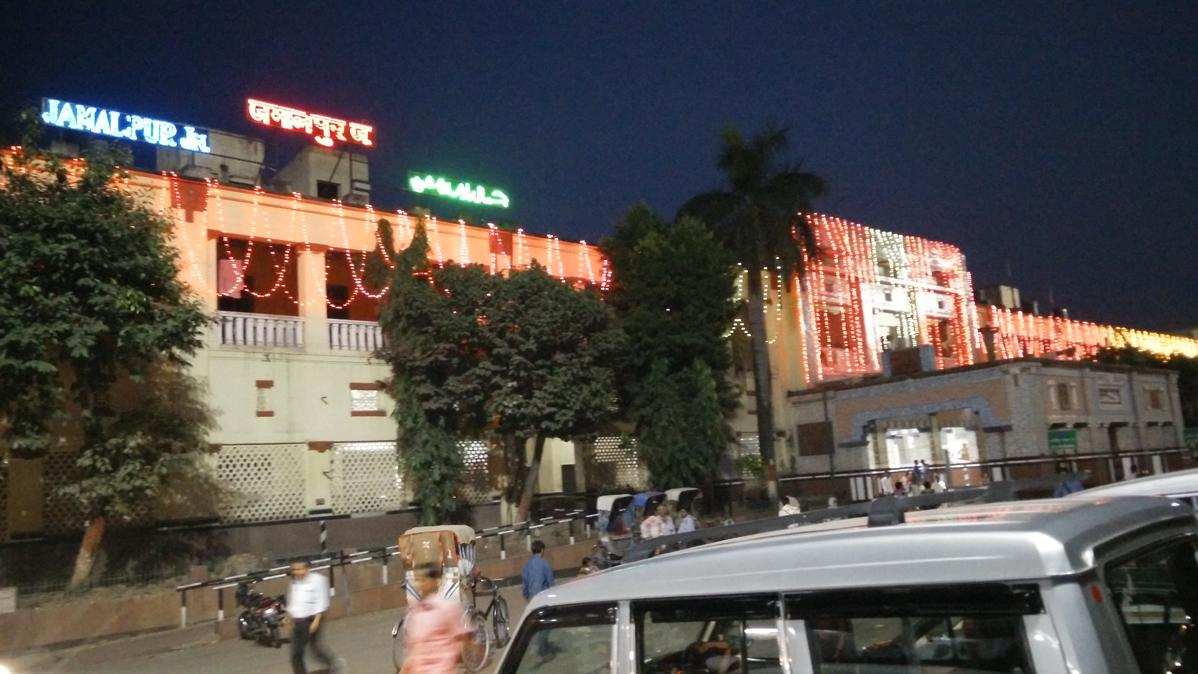

General information
- Location: Jamalpur, Bihar; India
- Coordinates: 25°30′53″N 86°50′38″E
- Elevation: 59 metres (194 ft)
- System: Express train and Passenger train station
- Owner: Indian Railways
- Operator: Eastern Railway zone
- Lines: Sahibganj loop , Barauni-Sahebpur kamal-Jamalpur line and khagaria-Jamalpur line
- Platforms: 4
- Tracks: 8

Construction
- Structure type: At grade
- Parking: Yes

Other information
- Status: Functional
- Station code: JMP
- Zone(s): Eastern Railway
- Division(s): Malda

History
- Opened: 1862; 164 years ago
- Electrified: Double electrified line

Passengers
- 200,000 per day

Services
East Railway
| Preceding station | Indian Railways | Following station |
|---|---|---|
| Terminus | Munger Ganga Bridge Towards Khagaria and Barauni | Munger towards ? |
| Sarobag Halt towards Khana Junction | Sahibganj loop | Patam Halt towards Kiul Junction |
Location
- Location within Bihar Location within India
- Interactive map

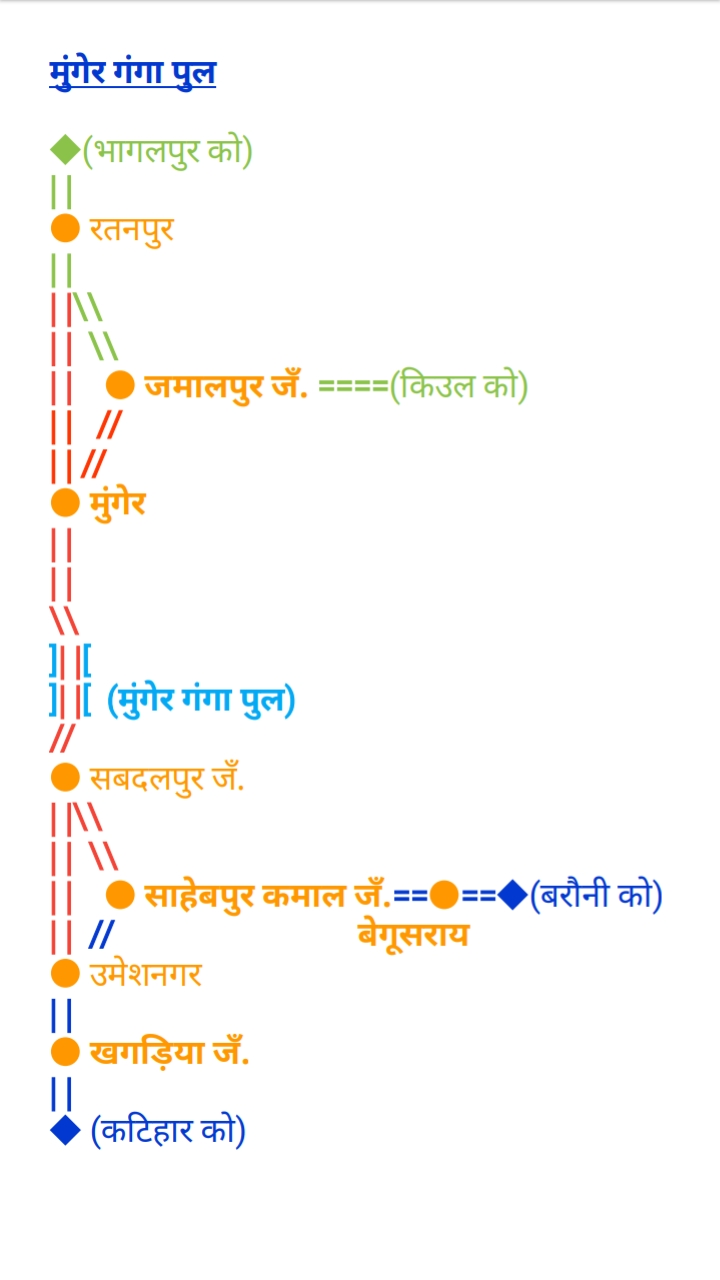
Munger Ganga Bridge rail route (red)

Jamalpur Junction railway station (station code: JMP), is the railway station serving the Munger–Jamalpur twin cities in the Munger district in the Indian State of Bihar.

== Location ==
Jamalpur Junction is the main railhead for Munger city. Jamalpur Junction is part of the Malda railway division of the Eastern Railway zone of the Indian Railways. Jamalpur Junction is connected to metropolitan areas of India, Sahibganj loop via Kiul–Rampurhat route. It has an average elevation of 59 metres (194 ft). The station is located about 8 km from Munger city.

== Lines ==
Traveling south-west, Kiul Junction railway station is the main station next to Jamalpur. Going east, Bhagalpur Junction is the nearest main station. A mega Munger Ganga Bridge connects it to nearby districts like Begusarai, Khagaria and various districts of North Bihar .

== Diesel loco Shed, Jamalpur ==
| Serial No. | Locomotive Class | Horsepower | Quantity |
|---|---|---|---|
| 1. | WDG-3A | 3100 | 40 |
| 2. | WDM-3A | 3100 | 2 |
| 3. | WAG-5 | 3850 | 17 |
| 4. | WAG-7 | 5350 | 59 |
| Total locomotives active as of February 2026 | | | 118 |

== Infrastructure ==
There are four platforms. The platforms are connected by four foot overbridges, escalators and elevators.

It is the first station of the Malda Division to have a Centralised Route Relay Interlocking (CRRI) system.

== See also ==
- Bhagalpur Junction railway station
- Rampurhat Junction Railway Station
- Munger railway station
- Purabsarai railway station
