= Barharwa Junction railway station =

Railway station in Jharkhand, India

Barharwa Junction
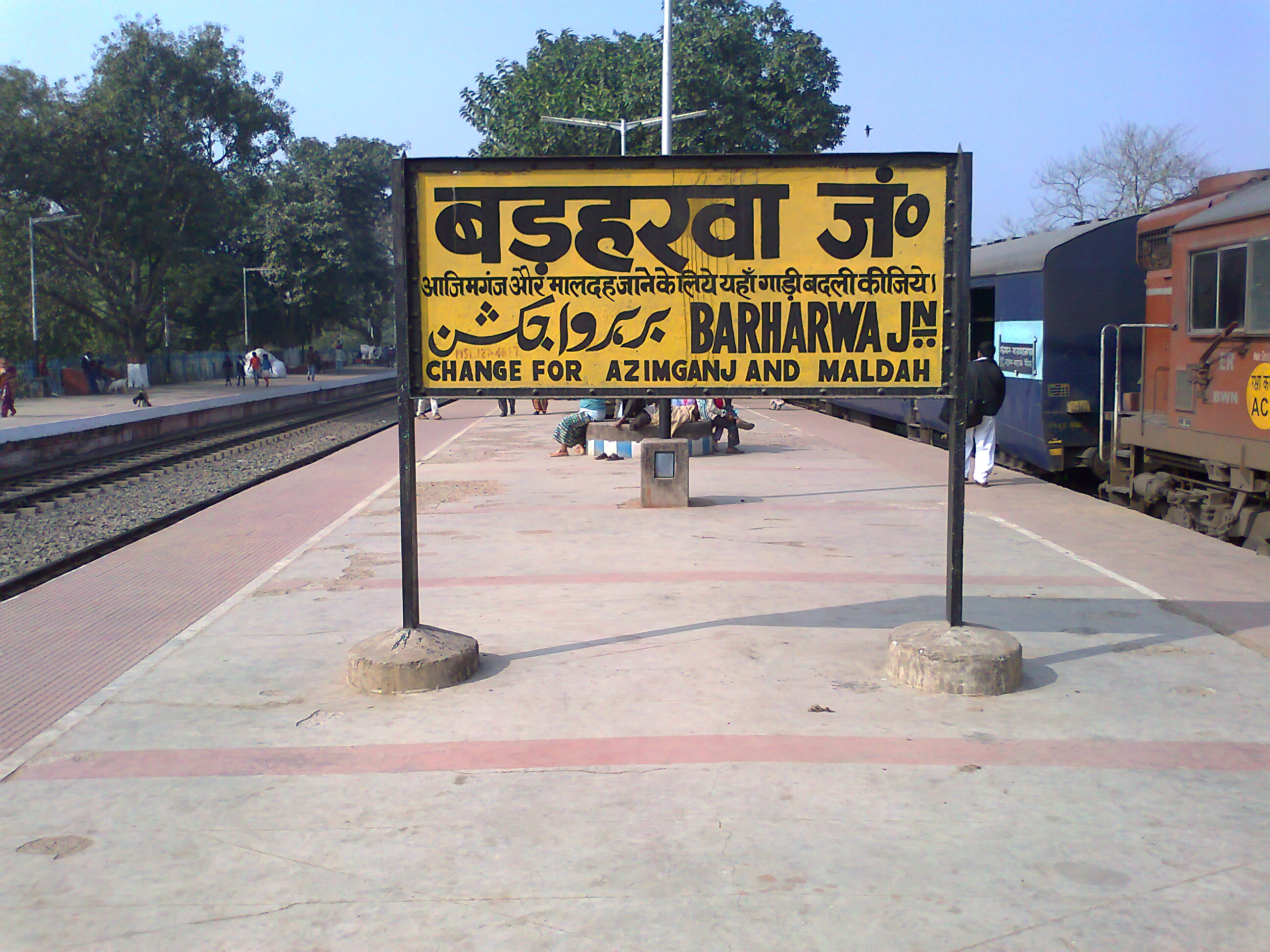

General information
- Location: Barharwa, Sahibganj, Jharkhand; India
- Coordinates: 24°51′28″N 87°46′27″E
- Elevation: 25 m (82 ft)
- System: Indian Railways junction station
- Owner: Indian Railways
- Lines: Rampurhat-Sahibganj Section; Barharwa–Azimganj–Katwa loop
- Platforms: 4
- Tracks: 4

Construction
- Structure type: At grade
- Parking: Yes (paid)

Other information
- Status: Functioning
- Station code: BHW
- Zone(s): Eastern Railway
- Division(s): Malda

History
- Opened: 1866;159 Years old
- Electrified: Yes(2019)
- Former names: East India Railway
Location

Barharwa Junction railway station is one of the important railway stations on the Rampurhat-Sahibganj section of Eastern Railway zone and it is the Largest and Busiest railway station of Sahibganj district of Jharkhand. It is a NSG-4 Category and Class B station. The station is under Malda railway division is the 5th busiest station in this division.

== History ==
The Howrah–Delhi main line was initially laid via Sahibganj and opened to traffic in 1866. Later, in 1871 the Raniganj–Kiul line was laid. The Khana–Sahibganj–Kiul section was renamed Sahibganj loop.

In 1913, the Barharwa–Azimganj–Katwa Railway constructed the Barharwa–Azimganj–Katwa loop.

The 15 kilometres (9.3 mi)-long Barharwa–New Farakka link was established later, allowing trains from both Howrah and Delhi to travel to New Jalpaiguri.

== Overview ==
Barharwa Junction is a B-category station under Malda division. It is one of the busiest station in terms of freight and goods trains service. Stone chips and mining materials are supplied all over the country from the hills near Barharwa. It is a junction point as train from Bhagalpur side going towards Malda Town and North Eastern States of India, going towards Azimganj and towards Rampurhat, Bolpur, Burdwan and Howrah and also Santhia-Andal.

== Gallery ==
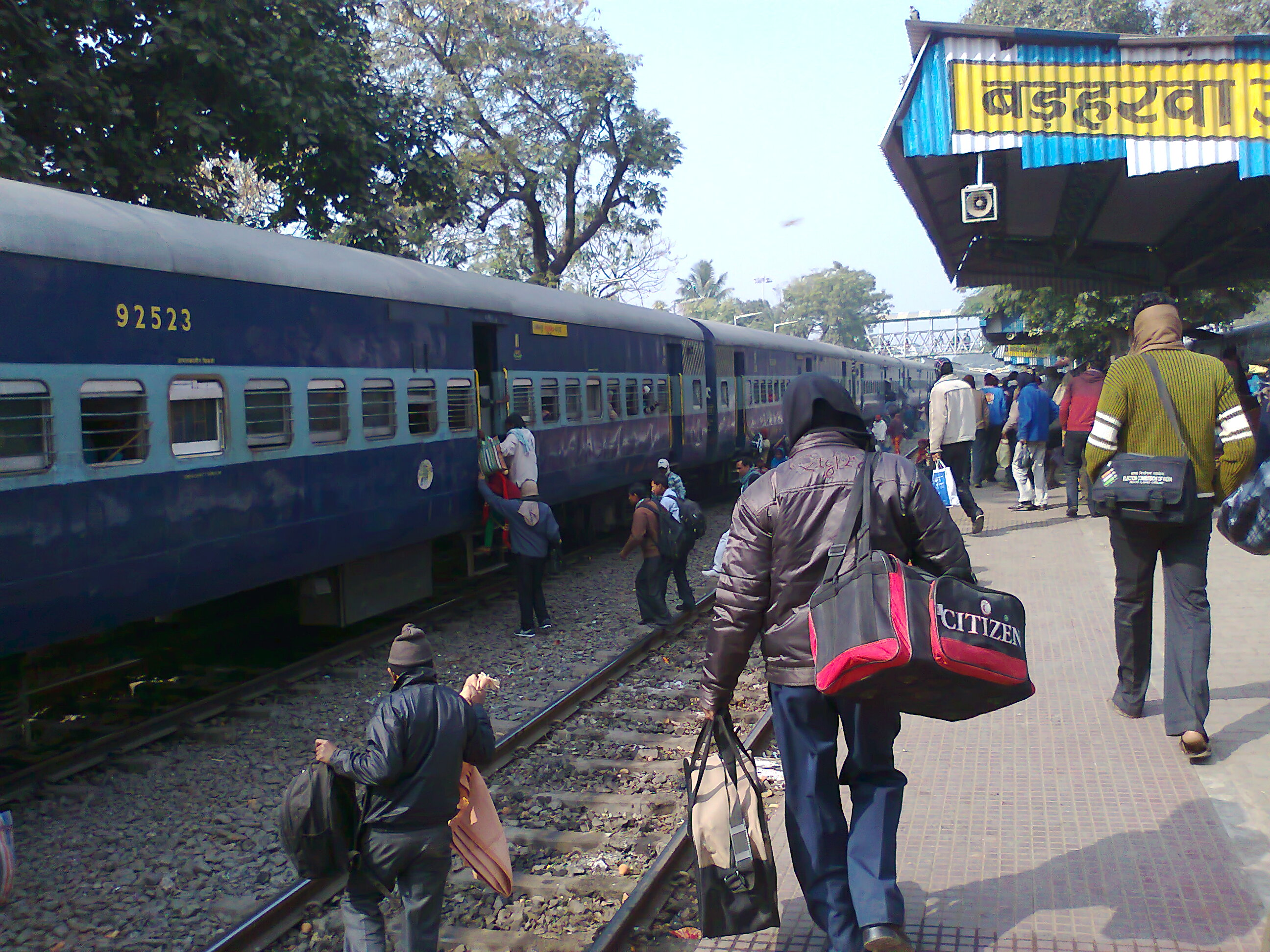
A passenger train at Barharwa

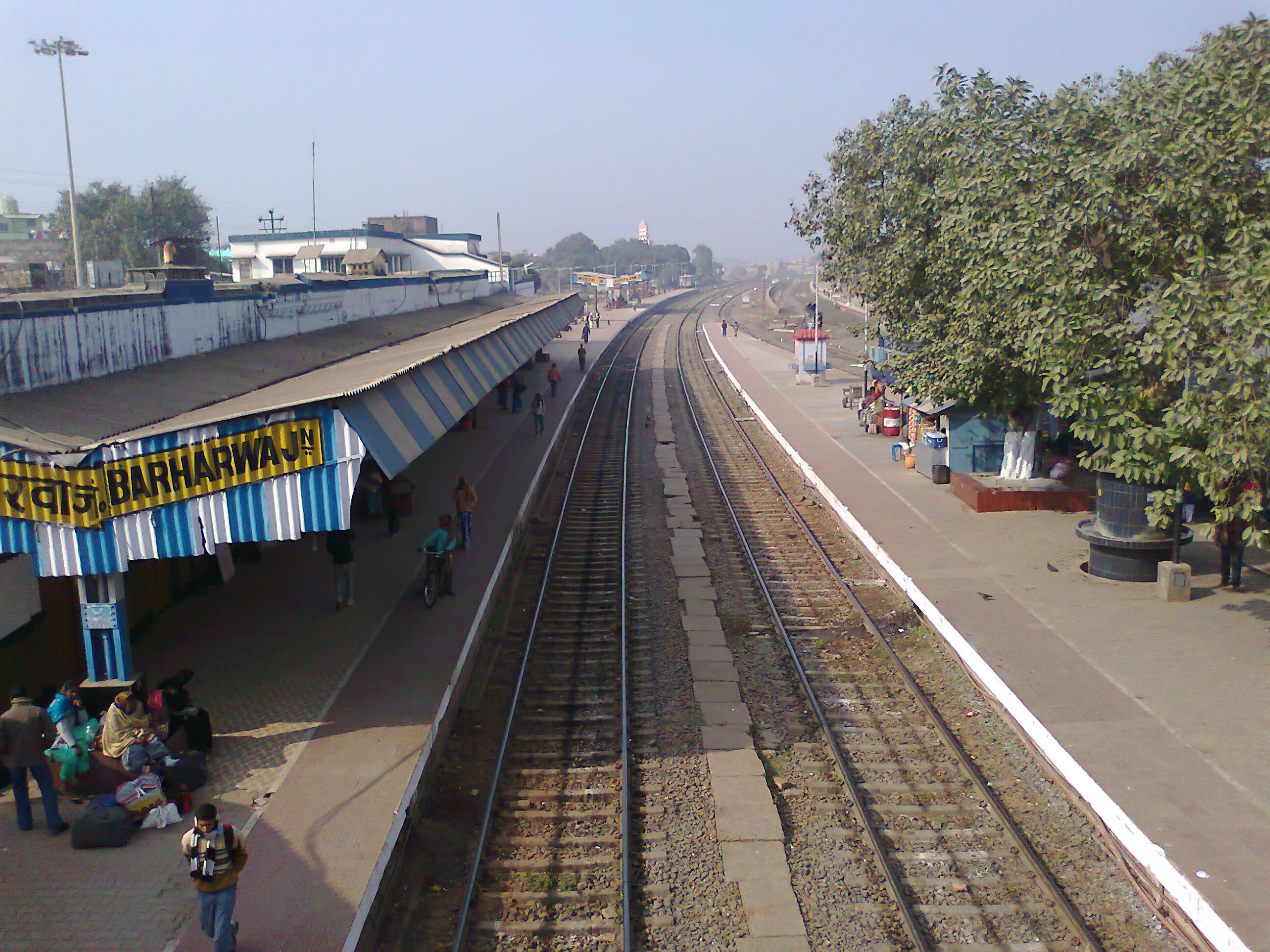
Barharwa Station western side

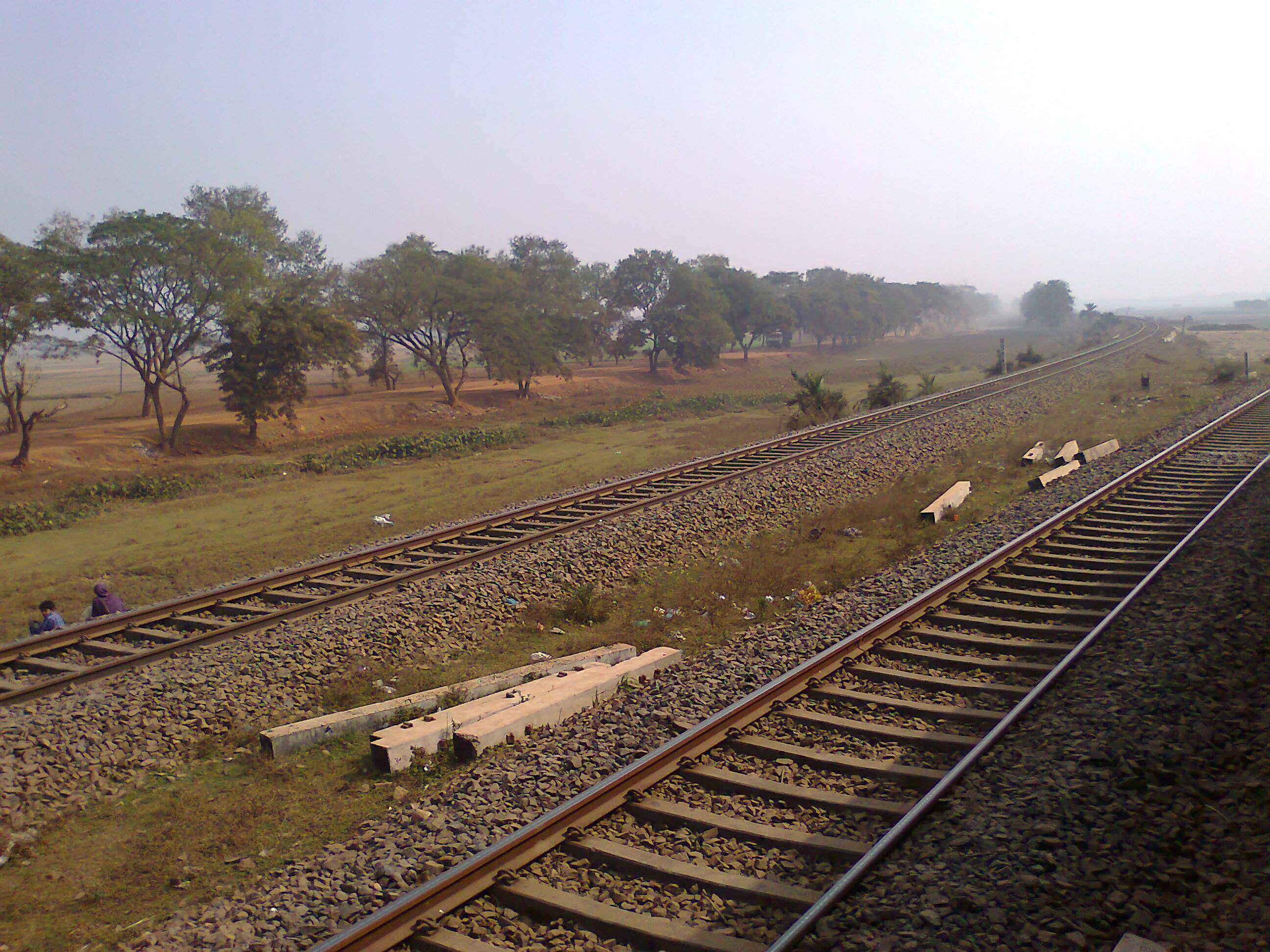
The point where both lines divert on the eastern side

Barharwa Junction
Next station west: Bakudi	Indian Railways : Sahibganj loop			Next station east: Gumani
Next station west: Bakudi	Stop no. 44	km from start 0	Platforms 4	Next station east: Gumani
