= Sahibganj Junction railway station =

Railway station in Jharkhand

SAHIBGANJ JUNCTION

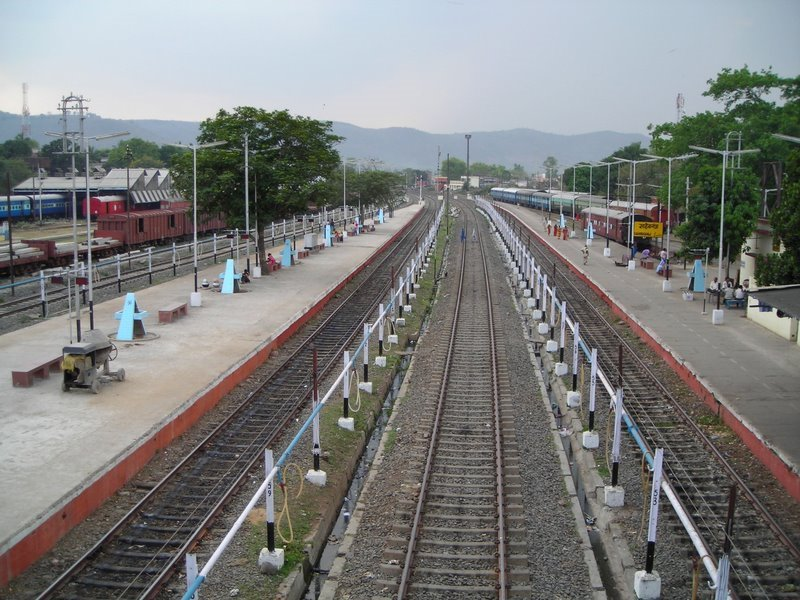
- View from the sahibganj railway station foot-over-bridge in 2008.

General information
- Location: National Highway 33, Sahebganj, Sahebganj district, Jharkhand; India
- Coordinates: 25°14′29″N 87°38′04″E
- Elevation: 40
- System: Indian Railways station
- Owner: Indian Railways
- Operator: Eastern Railway
- Line: Rampurhat-Sahibganj Section
- Platforms: 3
- Tracks: 2

Construction
- Structure type: At grade
- Parking: Available
- Accessible: Available

Other information
- Status: Active
- Station code: SBG
- Zone(s): Eastern Railway
- Division(s): Malda
- Classification: NSG-4

History
- Former names: East Indian Railway Company
Route map
Location
- Location within India Location within Jharkhand
- Interactive map of Sahibganj Junction

Sahibganj Junction (station code: SBG) is an important railway station on the Rampurhat-Sahibganj section of Sahibganj loop line under the Malda railway division of Eastern Railway zone. It is situated beside National Highway 33 at Sahebganj in Sahebganj district in the Indian state of Jharkhand.

| Preceding station | Indian Railways | Following station |
|---|---|---|
| Sakrigali towards Khana | Eastern Railway zone Sahibganj loop | Karamtola towards Kiul Junction |
| Terminus | Eastern Railway zone Sakrigali branch line | Sakrigali Ghat towards ? |
