= Kiul–Khana Loop Line =

Indian railway line

Kiul—Khana Loop Line
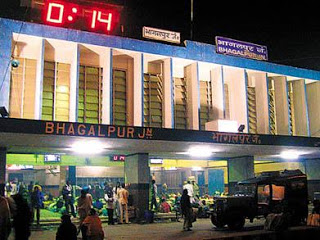
- Bhagalpur Junction is Important Station on Kiul–Khana Loop Line

Overview
- Status: Operational
- Owner: Indian Railways
- Locale: West Bengal, Jharkhand, Bihar
- Termini: Khana Junction; Kiul Junction

Service
- Operator(s): Eastern Railway

History
- Opened: 1866

Technical
- Line length: 403.8 km (251 mi)
- Number of tracks: 1/ 2
- Track gauge: 5 ft 6 in (1,676 mm) broad gauge
- Electrification: Yes
- Operating speed: 130 km/h

The Kiul—Khana Loop Line is a railway line connecting Kiul Junction and Khana Junction. Originally a part of the Howrah–Delhi main line, it was opened to traffic in 1866. With the construction of a shorter railway line for a part of the route, the 403.8 kilometres (250.9 mi) stretch was assigned a separate identity.

== History ==
Railway transportation was introduced in India within 30 years of its maiden run in England.

The East Indian Railway Company which was formed on 1 June 1845, completed its survey for a railway line from Kolkata, then called Calcutta, to Delhi via Mirzapur in 1846. The company initially became defunct on refusal of government guarantee, which was given in 1849. Thereafter, an agreement was signed between East Indian Railway Company and the East India Company, for the construction and operation of an "experimental" line between Kolkata and Rajmahal, which would later be extended to Delhi via Mirzapur. Construction began in 1851.

On 15 August 1854, the first passenger train in the eastern section was operated up to Hooghly, 39 kilometres (24 mi) away. On 1 February 1855 the first train ran from Hooghly to Raniganj, 195 kilometres (121 mi) from Howrah. The priority accorded to the Raniganj section was because of the assurance of coal transportation.

The Khana Junction-Rajmahal section was complete in October 1859, crossing Ajay River on the way. The first train ran from Howrah to Rajmahal via Khana on 4 July 1860. The Loop from Khana Junction to Kiul via Jamalpur, including the Monghyr branch, was ready in February 1862.

From Rajmahal, construction progressed rapidly, moving westward along the banks of the Ganges, reaching Bhagalpur in 1861, Munger in February 1862, and opposite Varanasi (across the Ganges) in December 1862 and then on to Naini on the bank of the Yamuna. The work included EIR's first tunnel at Jamalpur and first major bridge across the Son River at Arrah.

During 1863–64, work progressed rapidly on the Allahabad–Kanpur–Tundla and Aligarh–Ghaziabad sections. The Yamuna bridge near Delhi was completed in 1864 and EIR established the Delhi terminus. The Yamuna bridge at Allahabad opened on 15 August 1865 and in 1866 Kolkata and Delhi were directly linked. The 1 Dn/ 2 Up Mail started running.

With the completion of the 300.8-kilometre (186.9 mi) long line from Khana Junction connecting Durgapur, Asansole with Kiul Junction in 1871, a "shorter main line" was in position. Initially, it was called the chord line. However, as it attracted more traffic it was designated the main line and the original line became the Sahibganj loop.

After approx 150 years of operation, Sahibganj loop is converted in double line on 14-05-2019 except Ratanpur–Jamalpur section as construction of tunnel near Jamalpur is in progress. Train operation with Electric Loco in Kiul–Bhagalpur section is started on 03–06–2019.

In the Rail Budget 2008, Bhagalpur was announced to be converted to as Railway Division but decision withdrawn by ER in 2009. The new rail lines from Sultanganj to Deoghar announced and the construction yet to start . Bhagalpur to Rampurhat via Dumka 184.9-kilometre (114.9 mi) section is operational. Bhagalpur to Deoghar via Banka 107.1-kilometre (66.5 mi) section is operational. Bhagalpur to Godda via Hansdiha is operational.

== Route ==
Khana → Bolpur → Rampurhat → Pakur→ Gumani → Sahibganj → Bhagalpur → Jamalpur → Kiul

== Branch lines ==
In 1863, the Indian Branch Railway Company, a private company opened the Nalhati–Azimganj branch line. The 50 kilometres (31 mi) track was initially a 4' gauge line. The track was subsequently converted to 5' 6" broad gauge. The Indian Branch Railway Company was purchased by the Government of India in 1872 and the line was renamed Nalhati State Railway. It became a part of the East Indian Railway Company in 1892.

In 1913, the Hooghly–Katwa Railway constructed a 105-kilometre (65 mi)line from Bandel to Katwa, and the Barharwa–Azimganj–Katwa railway constructed the 171.9-kilometre (106.8 mi) Barharwa–Azimganj–Katwa loop line. The 73.3-kilometre (45.5 mi) Andal–Sainthia branch line was built in 1913.

The 105-kilometre (65 mi)-long Ahmedpur–Katwa Light Railway connecting Ahmadpur Junction and Katwa Junction and Katwa Junction to Barddhaman Junction, built on 760 millimetres (30 in), was opened to traffic on 29 September 1917.

184.9-kilometre (114.9 mi) Bhagalpur to Rampurhat via Dumka section is operational. 107.1-kilometre (66.5 mi) Bhagalpur to Deoghar section via Banka is operational.

72.9-kilometre (45.3 mi) Mirza Cheoki–Godda and 67.6-kilometre (42.0 mi) Godda–Hansdiha is operational. Trains are running between Bhagalpur and Godda via Hansdiha.

== Developments ==
Only Ratanpur to Jamalpur of the Sahibganj loop is still operating on single track. Work of construction of second tunnel near Janalpur is in progress. Second tunnel work near Jamalpur is likely to be completed by 2021. Twenty-one pairs of trains ply between Bhagalpur and Sahibganj.

New rail line from Pakur–Godda and Bashukinath Dham–Chatra is proposed. Work for doubling the 111-kilometre-long (69 mi) stretch started in 2010 (announced in 1996).

Work on the new 130-kilometre-long (81 mi) Rampurhat–Dumka–Mander Hill broad-gauge line completed and Kavi Guru Express BhagalpurJn to Howrah is running on this route.

== Jamalpur Workshop ==
Jamalpur Workshop, the first full-fledged railway workshop facility in India, was opened on 8 February 1862, at a time when the Howrah–Delhi main line, passing through Jamalpur was under construction. It was felt that communities of gunsmiths and other craftsmen in the area handling mechanical engineering jobs could pick up the skills required in a railway workshop. It undertook repairs of wagons, coaches, cranes and tower cars, and locomotives, as well as manufacture of some tower cars, break-down cranes and various kinds of heavy-duty lifting jacks. They also produced their own locomotives, starting with the CA 764 Lady Curzon in 1899. It has also produced ticket printers and other ticket machines (slitting, counting, and chopping). With fairly extensive workshop facilities, it was a fairly self-contained.

== Electrification ==
Electrification of the Khana–Rampurhat–Sainthia–Pakur section was announced in the rail budget for 2010–11. The electrification of Ahmedpur–Khana–Sainthia–Rampurhat–Pakur–Bonidanga section was completed in 2016. The first electric train service started from 29 September 2016 through running of Howrah – Rampurhat Express by Electric Locomotive.

The electrification of Bonidanga Link Cabin–Barharwa–Sahibganj–Kiul section including the Tinpahar – Rajmahal section (Announced by Prime Minister Package in Bihar) has been started from September 2017 and was expected to be completed by the end of March 2020 but got delayed due to COVID-19 pandemic and was completed on 30 June 2020.

After approximately 150 years of operation of Kiul–Bhagalpur section of Sahibganj loop, Vikramshila Express became the first train to be hauled by an electric locomotive on 2 June 2019.

After the electrification between Bhagalpur to Kiul, first train with electric locomotive on this loop was started with Vikramshila Express between Anand Vihar Terminal to Bhagalpur hauled by WAP-5 of Ghaziabad Shed. The next day it departed and ran with the same electric loco from Bhagalpur Junction till Anand Vihar Terminal. By then almost 8 pairs of express trains originated from Bhagalpur begun its operations by electric locomotives.

The electrification of the further loop line between Bhagalpur to Bonidanga Link Cabin was delayed due to doubling work between Sahibganj–Bhagalpur section which was completed in the month of April 2019.

After the electrification of Bhagalpur Kiul section, the remaining electrification work was resumed between Bhagalpur to Bonidanga in 4 stages which began from both sides, As the Bonidanga–Barharwa section was electrified within a month in the 1st phase.

The remaining work continued between Barharwa–Tinpahar which was completed within two months in its 2nd phase.

Within that time, doubling work between Bhagalpur to Kahalgaon section was completed but, it was again delayed due to the ongoing Route-Relay Interlocking (RRI) work. So, the remaining electrification work from Bhagalpur side was paused due to RRI work.

After the electrification of Barharwa–Tinpahar section, Tinpahar–Sahibganj section was electrified in its third phase and its CRS Inspection was completed between Sahibganj to Barharwa.

The 4th last phase of remaining electrification work was done between Sahibganj to Bhagalpur into two parts.

1. Sahibganj–Shivnarayanpur (33 km) – was completed in February 2020
2. Shivnarayanpur–Bhagalpur (42 km) – was completed in March 2020, CRS Inspection was done on 30 June 2020.

With the completion of electrification of Sahibganj loop from (Bonidanga Link Cabin to Kiul) distance of total 247 rkm, it became a history by becoming 100% fully electrified. The Howrah–New Delhi oldest rail route was constructed in the late 1880s by the British Government (East India Company) and thus, it ended the longest running era of diesel locomotives.

After this section was fully electrified between Bhagalpur – Shivnarayanpur remaining portion which is under Eastern Railways’ Malda division, Train number - 05956/05955 Delhi–Dibrugarh-Delhi Special Brahmaputra Mail was the first express train from Delhi to reach up to New Jalpaiguri with an Electric Locomotive. According to the NFR zone, the national transporter will save an amount of around Rs 20.4 crore per annum in its fuel cost, for running this train on electric traction between Pandit Deen Dayal Upadhyaya Jn (formerly Mughalsarai Junction) and New Jalpaiguri Jn railway stations.

Finally, the whole Sahibganj loop route has been electrified and the last CRS inspection was done on 30 June 2020 between Bhagalpur and Shivnarayanpur. Electric Trains are fully operational now in this route.

== See also ==
- Khana railway station
- Rampurhat Junction railway station
- Barharwa Junction railway station
- Sahibganj Junction railway station
- Bhagalpur Station
- Jamalpur Junction railway station
- Kiul Junction railway station
