= Bhagalpur–Anand Vihar Terminal Garib Rath Express =

Train in India

Bhagalpur - Anand Vihar Terminal Garib Rath Express
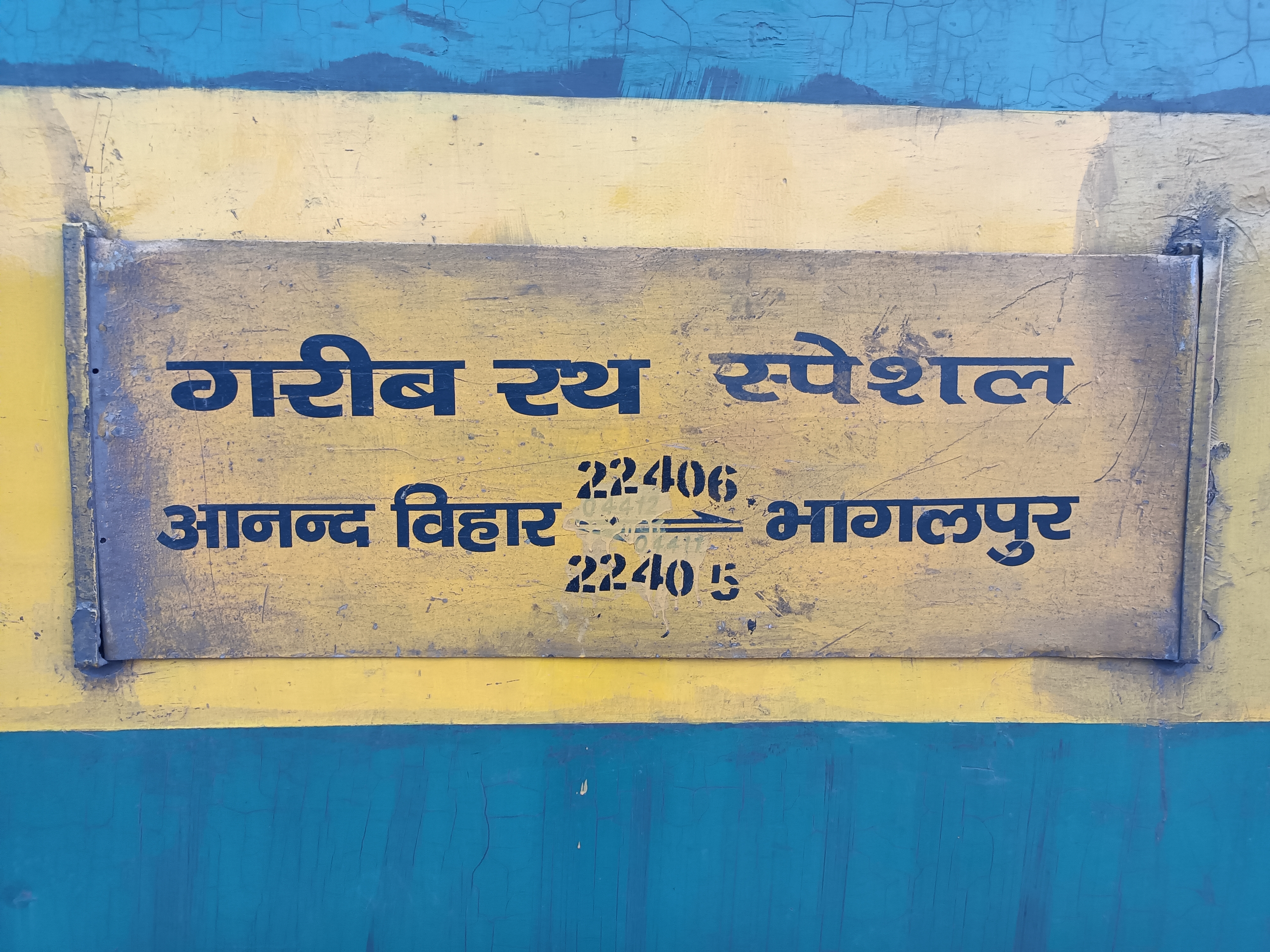
- Bhagalpur Garib Rath Express at Anand Vihar Terminal

Overview
- Service type: Garib Rath Express
- Status: Operating
- Locale: Bihar, Uttar Pradesh & Delhi
- First service: 10 February 2011
- Current operator: Northern Railways

Route
- Termini: Bhagalpur (BGP); Anand Vihar Terminal (ANVT)
- Stops: 18
- Distance travelled: 1,208 km
- Average journey time: 18.5 hrs
- Service frequency: Tri-weekly
- Train number: 22405/22406

On-board services
- Class: Third AC
- Seating arrangements: Available
- Sleeping arrangements: Available
- Auto-rack arrangements: Available
- Catering facilities: Available(paid)(without pantry car)
- Observation facilities: LHB Large Windows
- Baggage facilities: Available

Technical
- Track gauge: 1,676 mm (5 ft 6 in)
- Operating speed: Average - 65 km/h Maximum - 130 km/h
Route map
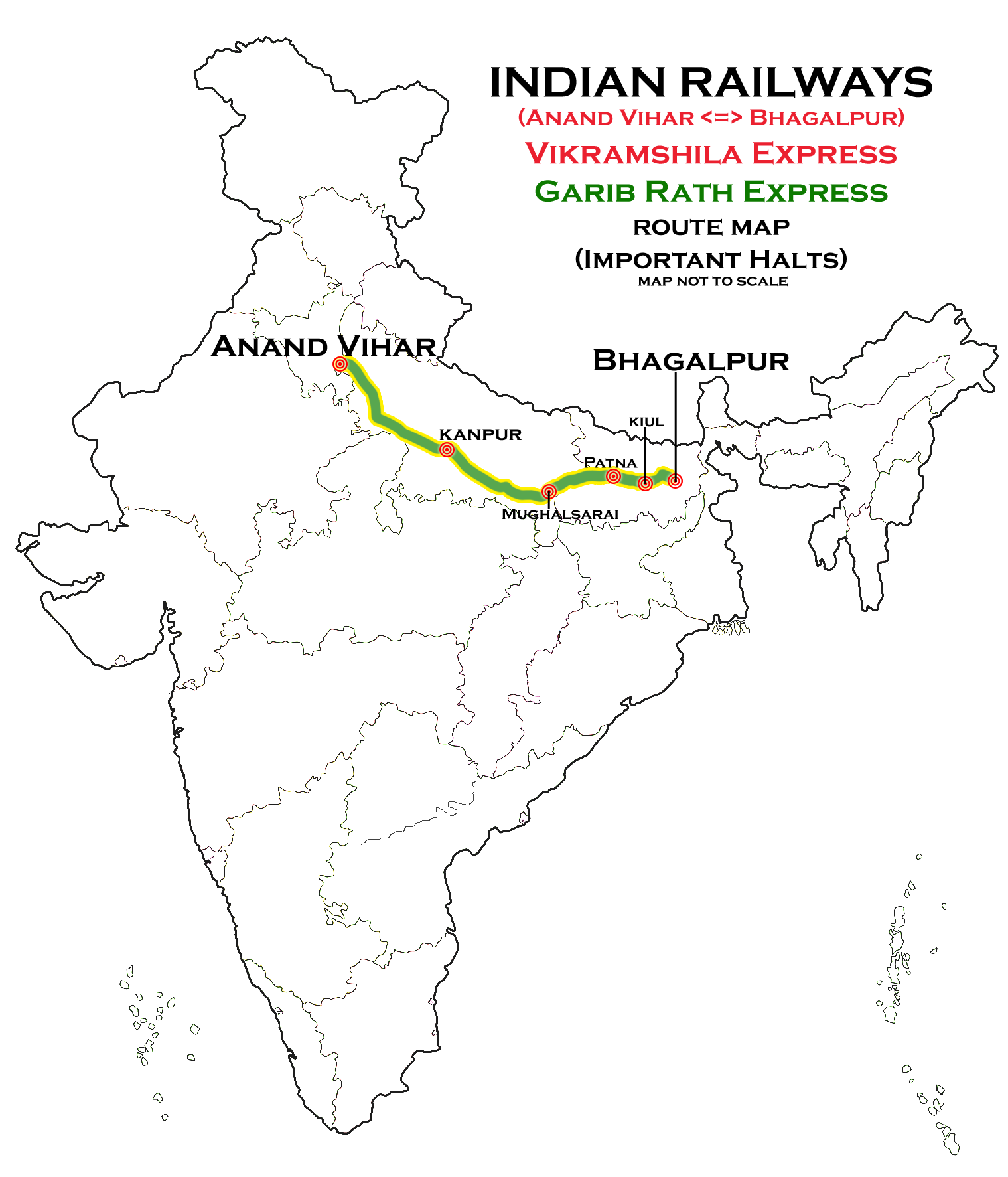

The 22405/22406 Bhagalpur–Anand Vihar Terminal Garib Rath Express is a Garib Rath service of Indian Railways connecting Bhagalpur in Bihar with Anand Vihar Terminal in Delhi. It was introduced on 10 February 2011 as an extension of the 12353/12354 Rajendra Nagar–Hazrat Nizamuddin Garib Rath Express, extending the service from Patna to Bhagalpur.

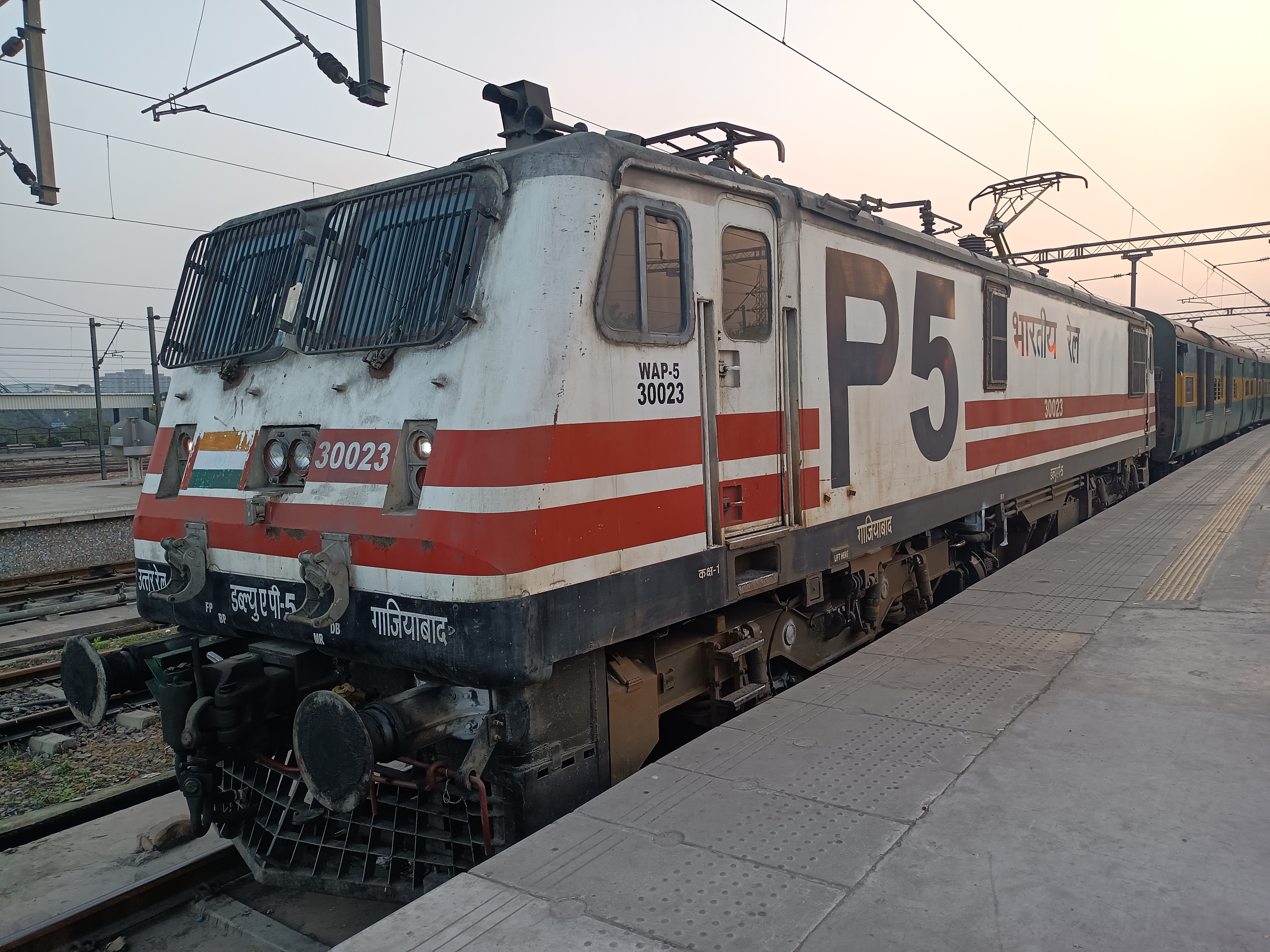
Ghaziabad-based WAP-5 locomotive at Anand Vihar Terminal with the Anand Vihar-Bhagalpur Garib Rath Express

== History ==
The Garib Rath concept was announced by Railway Minister Lalu Prasad Yadav in the 2006–07 Railway Budget. It was planned as a fully air-conditioned train service offering lower fares than conventional AC services. The first services were introduced in October 2006, including the Saharsa–Amritsar and Patna–Delhi routes.

The Bhagalpur–Anand Vihar Terminal Garib Rath Express was inaugurated on 10 February 2011. It was introduced as an extension of the tri-weekly Rajendra Nagar–Hazrat Nizamuddin Garib Rath Express, extending the service from Patna to Bhagalpur. The decision was intended to provide passengers from Bhagalpur and the adjoining districts of eastern Bihar with a direct connection to Delhi. The existing Rajendra Nagar–Hazrat Nizamuddin service had also been shifted to Anand Vihar Terminal in February 2011.

== Traction ==
Following the completion of electrification on the Bhagalpur–Jamalpur–Kiul section in June 2019, the entire route became suitable for electric locomotive operation. The train subsequently adopted electric traction for its journeys between Bhagalpur and Anand Vihar Terminal.

== Route and halts ==
It commences its journey from the Bhagalpur Junction railway station and travels through the Indian states of Bihar and Uttar Pradesh to reach Anand Vihar Terminal near Delhi.

- Bhagalpur Junction
- Sultanganj
- Jamalpur Junction
- Abhaipur
- Kiul Junction
- Rajendra Nagar Terminal
- Patna Junction
- Danapur Junction
- Bihta
- Ara Junction
- Bihiya
- Dumraon
- Buxar
- Dildarnagar Junction
- Pt. Deen Dayal Upadhyay Jn.
- Prayagraj Junction
- Kanpur Central
- Tundla Junction
- Aligarh Junction
- Anand Vihar Terminal

== Coach composition ==
The train operates with an LHB rake comprising 20 AC Three Tier Economy coaches and 2 End-on Generation (EOG) cars. The coaches are numbered G1 to G20, with an EOG car at each end. The train has a listed maximum permissible speed of 130 km/h on certain sections of its route.

Loco	1	2	3	4	5	6	7	8	9	10	11	12	13	14	15	16	17	18	19	20	21	22
	EOG	G1	G2	G3	G4	G5	G6	G7	G8	G9	G10	G11	G12	G13	G14	G15	G16	G17	G18	G19	G20	EOG

== See also ==
- Bhagalpur - Lokmanya Tilak Terminus Superfast Express
- Surat–Bhagalpur Express
- Vikramshila Express
- Anga Express
