= Abhaipur railway station =

Railway station in Lakhisarai, Bihar, India

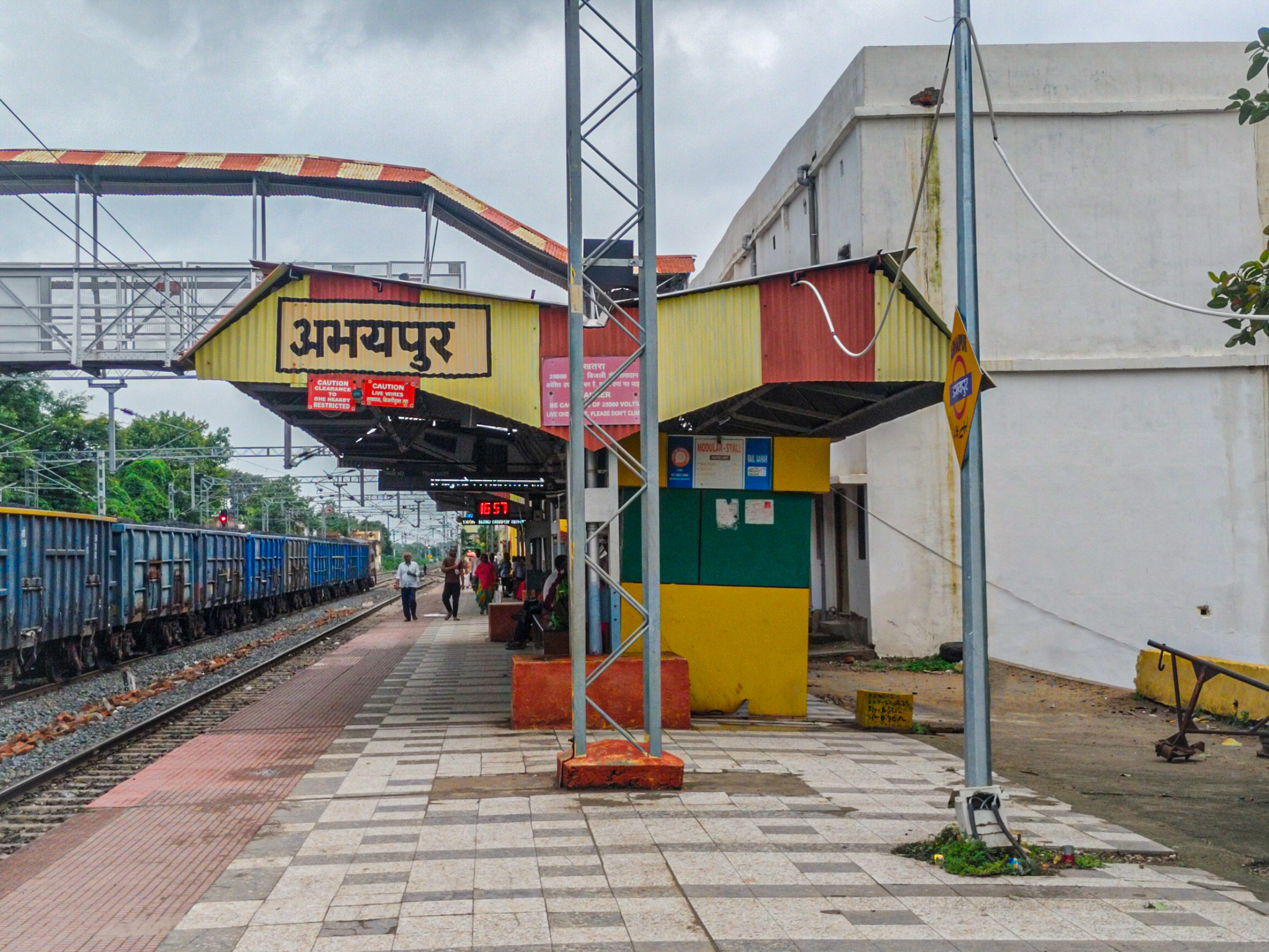
- Abhaipur Railway Station

General information
- Location: Jamalpur-Kajra Road, Abhaipur, Lakhisarai district, Bihar; India
- Coordinates: 25°12′58″N 86°19′23″E
- Elevation: 52 m (171 ft)
- System: Passenger train station
- Owner: Indian Railways
- Operator: Eastern Railway zone
- Line: Sahibganj loop line
- Platforms: 3
- Tracks: 4

Construction
- Structure type: Standard (on ground station)
- Parking: not available.

Other information
- Status: Active
- Station code: AHA
- Zone(s): Eastern Railway zone
- Division(s): Malda

History
- Opened: 1905
- Closed: no
- Rebuilt: yes.
- Former names: East Indian Railway Company

Services
Preceding station	Indian Railways	Following station
Masudan towards Khana	Eastern Railway zone Sahibganj loop	Ghogi Bariarpur towards Kiul Junction
Location
- Location within Bihar Location within India

Abhaipur railway station is a railway station on Sahibganj loop line under the Malda railway division of Eastern Railway zone. It is situated beside Jamalpur-Kajra Road at Chaukra, Abhaipur in Lakhisarai district in the Indian state of Bihar.

== Infrastructure ==
Abhaipur railway station has many basic amenities, such as wheelchair accessibility, waiting halls and food stalls.

Currently, this railway sation is going under redevelopment to add proper Parking facilities with Circulating Area as well as modern waiting hall, Enhanced ticket counter, with a foot over bridge.

== Train Stoppage ==
Almost every major trains stop here. Excluding 20501 / 20502 Anand Vihar-Agaratala Tejas Rajdhani Express, all trains passing through this route stops at this railway station.

Some notable trains are:

- 13435/13436 Malda Town - Gomti Nagar Amrit Bharat Express
- 12349/12350 – Godda–New Delhi Humsafar Express
- 15657/15658 – Old Delhi–Kamakhya Brahmputra Mail
- 12367/12368 – Bhagalpur–Anand Vihar(T) Vikramshila Express
- 22405/22406 – Bhagalpur–Anand Vihar Terminal Garib Rath Express
- 12253/12254 – Bhagalpur–Yeshwantpur Anga Express
- 15097/15098 – Bhagalpur–Jammu Tawi Amarnath Express
- 12335/12336 – Bhagalpur–Lokmanya Tilak (Mumbai) Express
- 13413/13414 – Farakka Express (via Sultanpur)
- 13483/13484 – Farakka Express (via Ayodhya)

== See also ==
- Jamalpur Junction railway station
- Bhagalpur Junction railway station
- Kiul Junction railway station
- Masudan railway station
