= Bhubaneswar–SMVT Bengaluru Humsafar Express =

Train in India

Bhubaneswar – SMVT Bengaluru Humsafar Express
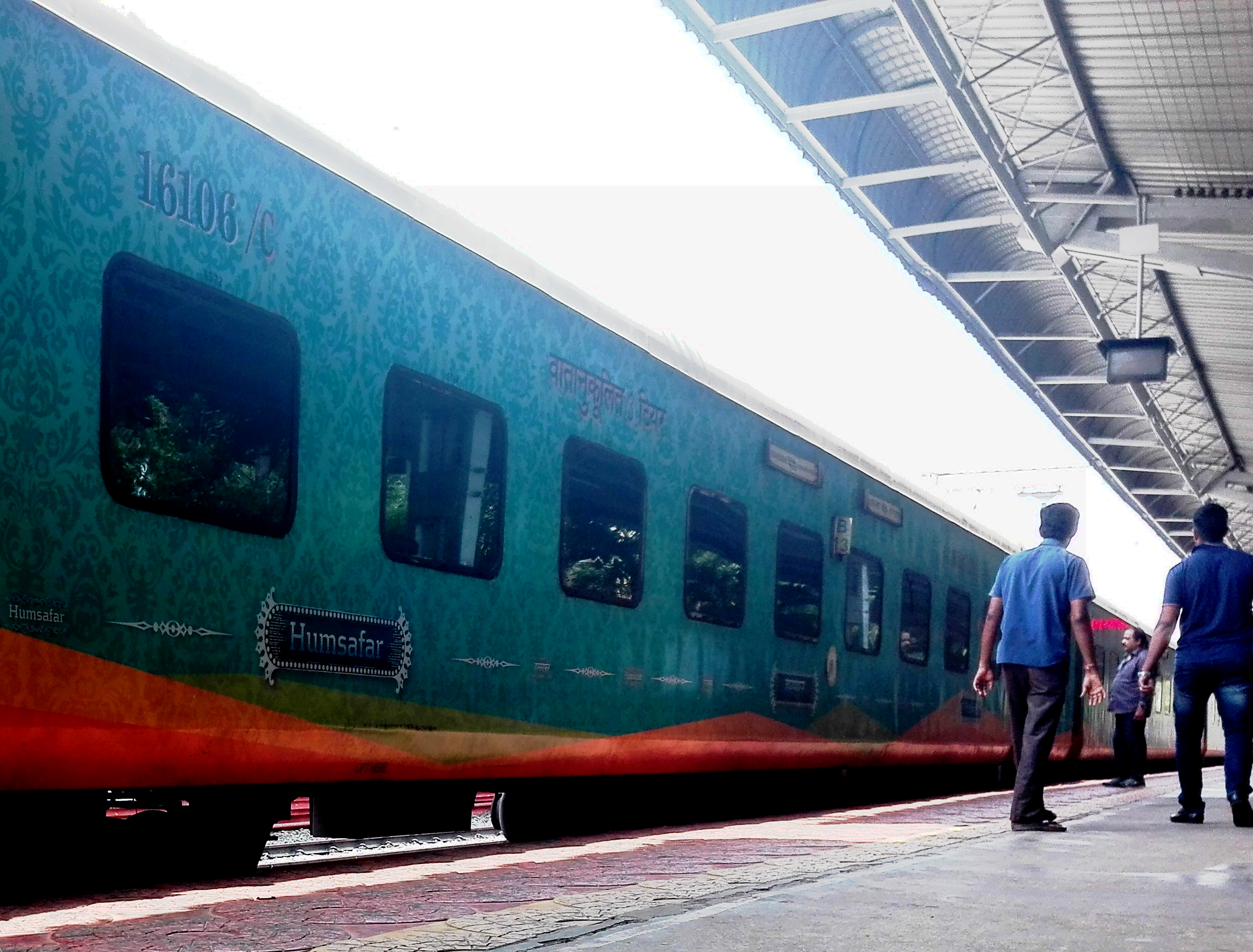
- Bhubaneswar Humsafar Express

Overview
- Service type: Humsafar Express
- First service: 13 July 2017; 8 years ago
- Current operator: East Coast Railways

Route
- Termini: Sir M. Visvesvaraya Terminal, Bengaluru (SMVT); Bhubaneswar (BBS)
- Stops: 17
- Distance travelled: 1,512 km (940 mi)
- Average journey time: 25h 0m
- Service frequency: Weekly (Note: Runs one in a week for every direction.)
- Train number: 22833 / 22834

On-board services
- Class: AC 3 tier
- Seating arrangements: No
- Sleeping arrangements: Yes
- Catering facilities: Available
- Observation facilities: Large windows

Technical
- Rolling stock: LHB Humsafar
- Track gauge: 1,676 mm (5 ft 6 in)
- Operating speed: 60 km/h (37 mph)
Route map
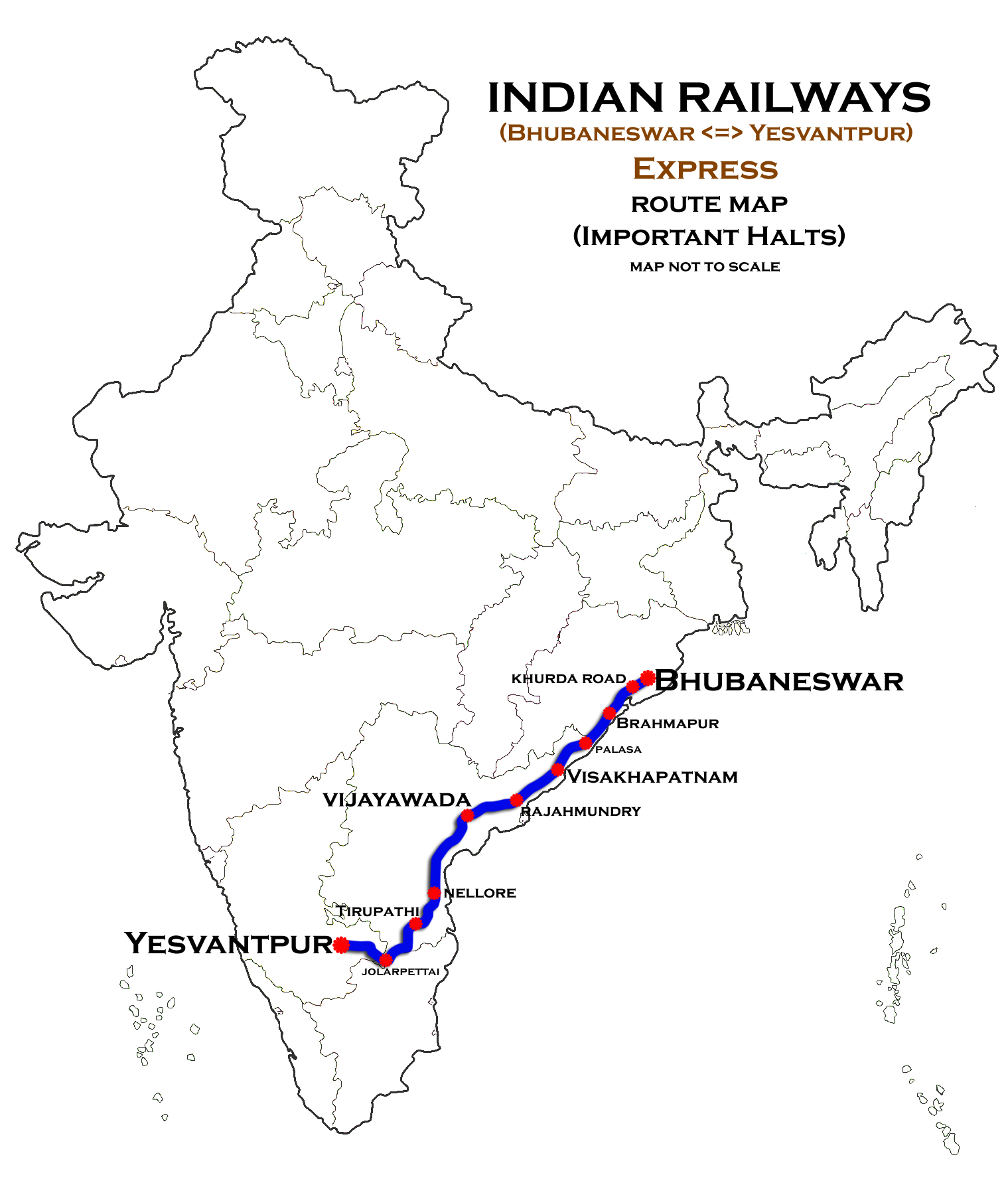

The 22833 / 22834 Bhubaneswar – SMVT Bengaluru Humsafar Express is a Humsafar Express train of the Indian Railways connecting Bhubaneswar in Odisha and SMVT Bengaluru in Karnataka. It is currently being operated with 22833/22834 train numbers on a weekly basis.

== Coach composition ==
The trains is completely 3-tier AC sleeper trains designed by Indian Railways with features of LED screen display to show information about stations, train speed etc. and will have announcement system as well, Vending machines for tea, coffee and milk, Bio toilets in compartments as well as CCTV cameras.

The train consists of 19 coaches :

- 16 AC III Tier
- 1 Pantry Car
- 2 Power Generator Car

== Service ==
It averages 60 km/h as 22833 Humsafar Express starts on Monday and covering 1512 km in 25 hrs & 59 km/h as 22834 Humsafar Express starts on Tuesday covering 1512 km in 25h 40m.

== Traction ==
earlier it was WAP-4. now It is hauled by a Visakhapatnam based WAP 7 locomotive from BBS to VSKP and VSKP to SMVT it is hauled by a Lallaguda based WAP 7 locomotive.

== Schedule ==
Train Number	Station Code	Departure Station	Departure Time	Departure Day	Arrival Station	Arrival Time	Arrival Day
02885	BBS	Bhubaneswar	12:10 Noon	Wednesday	SMVT Bengaluru	1:00 PM	Thursday
02886	SMVB	SMVT Bengaluru	4:55 PM	Thursday	Bhubaneswar	6:15 PM	Friday

== RSA - Rake Sharing ==
08408/08407 - 08408 Secunderabad–Bhubaneswar Summer AC Special

== Stoppage ==
- Bhubaneswar
- Khurda Road
- Brahmapur
- Palasa
- Srikakulam Road
- Vizianagaram
- Visakhapatnam
- Duvvada
- Rajahmundry
- Eluru
- Vijayawada
- Ongole
- Nellore
- Renigunta
- Katpadi Junction
- Bangarapet
- Krishnarajapuram
- Sir M. Visvesvaraya Terminal

== Direction Reversal ==
Train Reverses its direction 1 times:

- Visakhapatnam Junction

== See also ==
- Humsafar Express
- Bhubaneswar railway station
- Krishnarajapuram railway station
- Howrah–Yesvantpur Humsafar Express
- Bangalore Cantonment–Kamakhya Humsafar Express
