= Howrah–SMVT Bengaluru Humsafar Express =

Train in India

Howrah - SMVT Bengaluru Humsafar Express

Overview
- Service type: Humsafar Express
- First service: 20 January 2017; 8 years ago
- Current operator(s): South Eastern Railways

Route
- Termini: Howrah Junction (HWH); Sir M. Visvesvaraya Terminal (SMVB)
- Stops: 16
- Distance travelled: 1,953 km (1,214 mi)
- Average journey time: 31h 20m
- Service frequency: Weekly (Note: Runs once in a week for every direction.)
- Train number(s): 22887 / 22888

On-board services
- Class(es): AC 3 tier
- Seating arrangements: No
- Sleeping arrangements: Yes
- Catering facilities: Available
- Observation facilities: Large windows

Technical
- Rolling stock: LHB Humsafar
- Track gauge: 1,676 mm (5 ft 6 in)
- Operating speed: 62 km/h (39 mph)
Route map
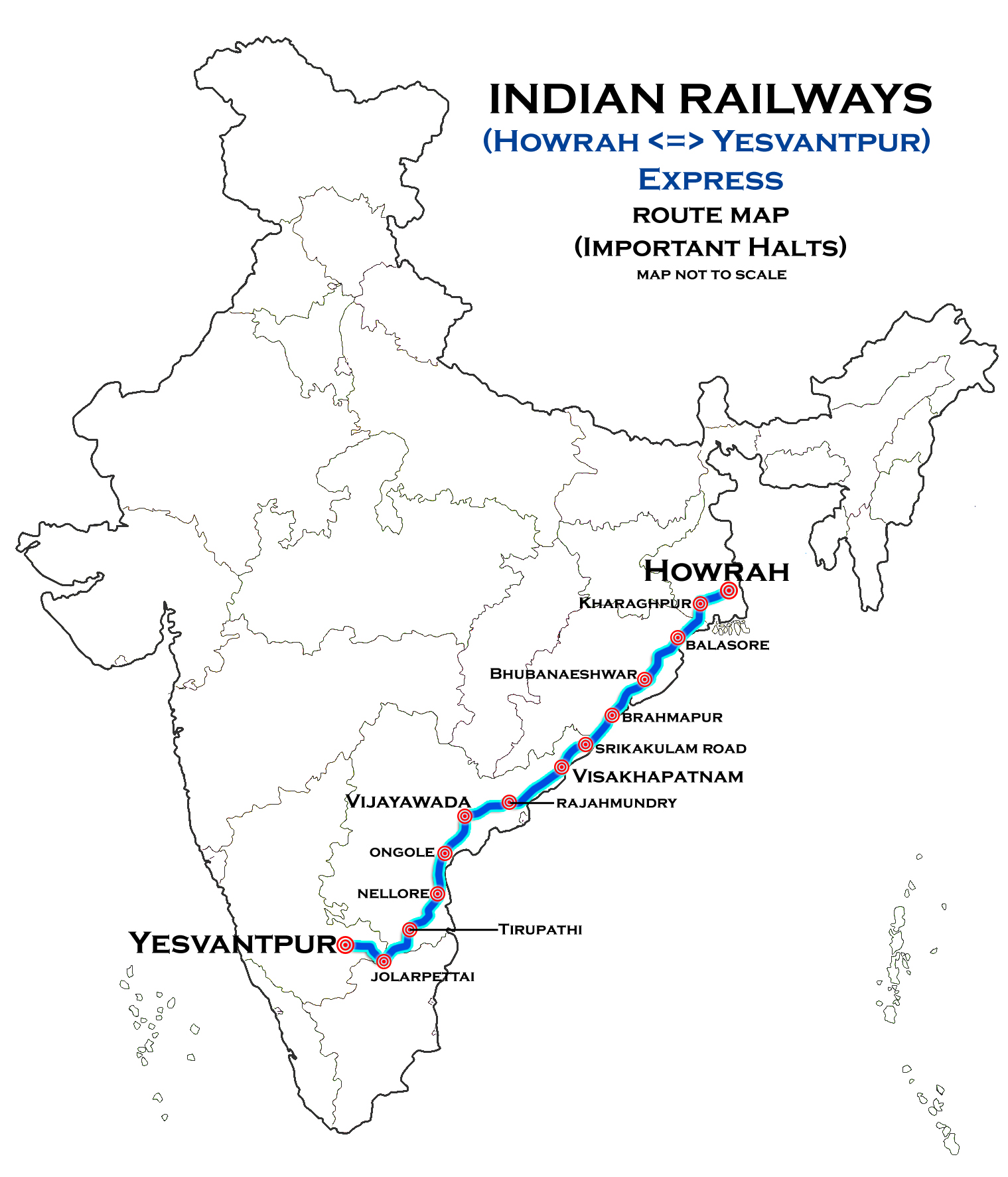

Howrah - SMVT Bengaluru Humsafar Express is a superfast express train of the Indian Railways connecting Sir M. Visvesvaraya Terminal in Karnataka and Howrah Junction in West Bengal . It is currently being operated with 22887/22888 train numbers on a weekly basis.

== Coach Composition ==
The trains is completely 3-tier AC sleeper trains designed by Indian Railways with features of LED screen display to show information about stations, train speed etc. and will have announcement system as well, Vending machines for tea, coffee and milk, Bio toilets in compartments as well as CCTV cameras.

== Service ==
It averages 60 km/h as 22887 Humsafar Express starts on Tuesday and covering 1970 km in 32 hrs 55 mins and 60 km/h as 22888 Humsafar Express starts on Thursday covering 1968 km in 32 hrs 35 mins.

== Schedule ==
22887 - Starts from Howrah Jn on every Tuesday at 12:40 Hrs IST and reach Sir M. Visvesvaraya Terminal next Day 20:00 Hrs IST

22888 - Starts from Sir M. Visvesvaraya Terminal every Thursday at 10:15 Hrs IST and reach Howrah Jn next day at 18:30 Hrs

== Route & Halts ==
1. Howrah
2. Kharagpur
3. Balasore
4. Bhadrak
5. Cuttack
6. Bhubaneswar
7. Khurda Road
8. Brahmapur
9. Palasa
10. Srikakulam Road
11. Vizianagaram
12. Visakhapatnam
13. Rajahmundry
14. Vijayawada
15. Ongole
16. Renigunta
17. Katpadi Junction
18. Jolarpettai Junction
19. Sir M. Visvesvaraya Terminal, Bengaluru

== Reverse ==
Train reverse at Visakhapatnam station

== RSA - Rake Sharing ==
20889/20890 - Howrah - Tirupati Humsafar Express

== Traction ==
Both trains are hauled by a Santragachi based WAP 7 electric locomotives from Howrah till Visakhapatnam. From Visakhapatnam till Sir M. Visvesaraya Terminal, Bengaluru it is hauled by a Lallaguda based WAP 7 electric locomotives and vice versa.

== See also ==
- Humsafar Express
- Howrah Junction railway station
- Yesvantpur Junction railway station
- Bhubaneswar - Krishnarajapuram Humsafar Express
- Agartala–SMVT Bengaluru Humsafar Express
