= Masudan railway station =

Railway station in Bihar, India

Masudan

General information
- Location: Abhaipur, Masudan, Lakhisarai district, Bihar; India
- Coordinates: 25°14′07″N 86°21′28″E
- Elevation: 45 m (148 ft)
- System: Passenger train station
- Owner: Indian Railways
- Operator: Eastern Railway zone
- Line: Sahibganj loop line
- Platforms: 2
- Tracks: 2

Construction
- Structure type: Standard (on ground station)

Other information
- Status: Active
- Station code: MSDN
- Zone(s): Eastern Railway zone
- Division(s): Malda

History
- Former names: East Indian Railway Company

Services
Preceding station	Indian Railways	Following station
Dharhara towards Khana	Eastern Railway zone Sahibganj loop	Abhaipur towards Kiul Junction
Location

Masudan railway station is a railway station on Sahibganj loop line under the Malda railway division of Eastern Railway zone. It is situated at Abhaipur, Masudan in Lakhisarai district in the Indian state of Bihar.
