= Dasharathpur railway station =

Railway station in Bihar, India

Dasharathpur

General information
- Location: Bangalwa Road, Dasharathpur, Munger district, Bihar; India
- Coordinates: 25°15′55″N 86°27′52″E
- Elevation: 49 m (161 ft)
- System: Passenger train station
- Owner: Indian Railways
- Operator: Eastern Railway zone
- Line: Sahibganj loop line
- Platforms: 2
- Tracks: 2

Construction
- Structure type: Standard (on ground station)

Other information
- Status: Active
- Station code: DRTP
- Zone(s): Eastern Railway zone
- Division(s): Malda

History
- Former names: East Indian Railway Company

Services
Preceding station	Indian Railways	Following station
Sarobag Halt towards Khana	Eastern Railway zone Sahibganj loop	Dharhara towards Kiul Junction
Location

Dasharathpur railway station is a railway station on Sahibganj loop line under the Malda railway division of Eastern Railway zone. It is situated beside Bangalwa Road at Dasharathpur in Munger district in the Indian state of Bihar.
