= Bhagalpur–Jammu Tawi Amarnath Express =

Train in India

Bhagalpur Jammu Tawi Amarnath Superfast Express
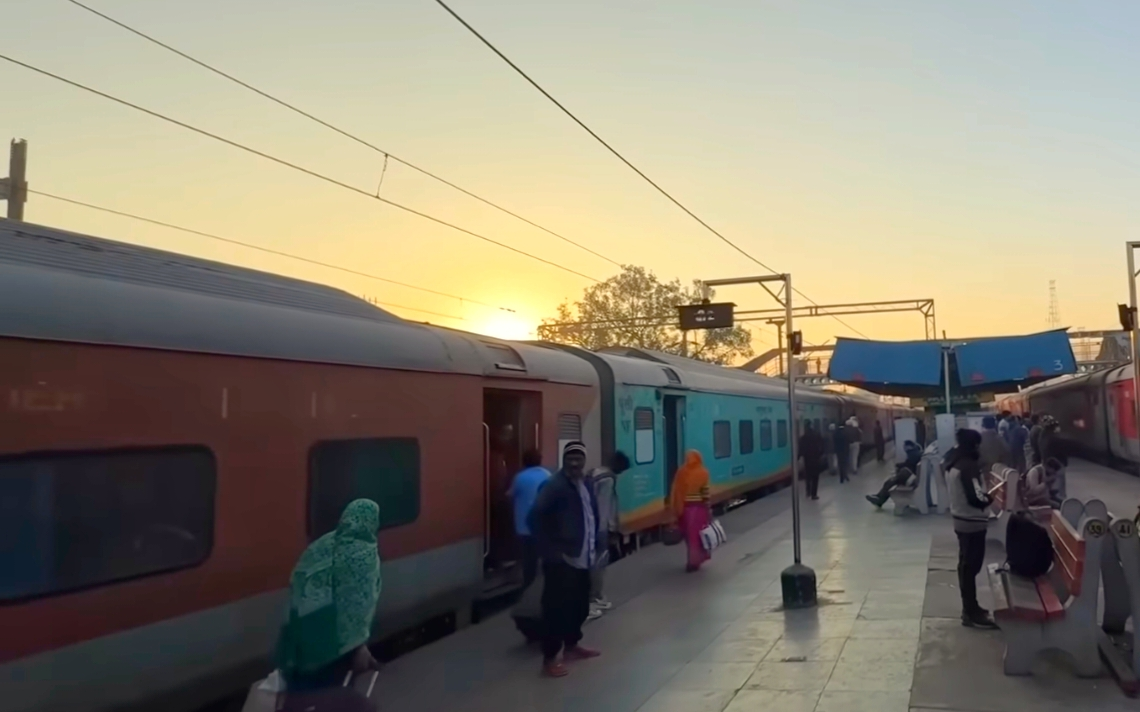
- Bhagalpur Jammu Tawi Amarnath Superfast Express At Ludhiana Junction railway station

Overview
- Service type: Superfast Express
- Locale: Bihar, Uttar Pradesh, Uttarakhand, Haryana, Punjab & Jammu and Kashmir
- Current operator: Northern Railway

Route
- Termini: Bhagalpur (BGP); Jammu Tawi (JAT)
- Stops: 29
- Distance travelled: 1,781 km (1,107 mi)
- Average journey time: 36 hrs 45 mins
- Service frequency: Weekly (runs one day per week for every direction)
- Train number: 15097 / 15098

On-board services
- Classes: AC 2 tier, AC 3 tier, Sleeper class, General Unreserved
- Seating arrangements: No
- Sleeping arrangements: Yes
- Catering facilities: Pantry Car, On-board catering, E-catering
- Observation facilities: Large windows
- Baggage facilities: No
- Other facilities: Below the seats

Technical
- Rolling stock: LHB coach
- Track gauge: 1,676 mm (5 ft 6 in)
- Operating speed: 48 km/h (30 mph) average including halts

The 15097 / 15098 Bhagalpur Jammu Tawi Amarnath Superfast Express is an Express train belonging to Northern Railway zone that runs between Bhagalpur Junction and Jammu Tawi via Muzaffarpur in India. It is currently being operated with 15097/15098 train numbers on a weekly basis.

== Schedule ==
15098 / 15097 Amarnath Express Schedule
Train Type	Mail / Express
Distance	1779 km
Journey Time (Jammu Tawi → Bhagalpur)	35 hours 10 minutes
Journey Time (Bhagalpur → Jammu Tawi)	37 hours 05 minutes
Classes Available	1A, 2A, 3A, Sleeper Class, General Unreserved
Operating Days	Weekly
Railway Zone	Northern Railway

== Route and halts ==
Amarnath Express (Jammu Tawi–Bhagalpur)
15098 Jammu Tawi - Bhagalpur				15097 Bhagalpur - Jammu Tawi			
Station	Day	Arr.	Dep.	Station	Day	Arr.	Dep.
Jammu Tawi	1	—	22:45	Bhagalpur	1	—	23:55
Kathua	1	23:45	23:47	Sultanganj	2	00:11	00:13
Pathankot Cantt Junction	2	00:30	00:35	Jamalpur Junction	2	00:52	00:57
Jalandhar Cantt Junction	2	02:20	02:25	Dharhara	2	01:10	01:12
Ludhiana Junction	2	03:20	03:30	Abhaipur	2	01:23	01:25
Ambala Cantt Junction	2	05:17	05:25	Kiul Junction	2	02:35	02:40
Yamunanagar Jagadhri	2	06:10	06:12	Barauni Junction	2	04:35	04:45
Saharanpur Junction	2	06:40	06:50	Samastipur Junction	2	05:30	05:35
Roorkee Junction	2	07:40	07:45	Muzaffarpur Junction	2	06:45	06:50
Laksar Junction	2	08:02	08:04	Hajipur Junction	2	07:56	08:01
Moradabad Junction	2	10:10	10:20	Sonpur Junction	2	08:09	08:11
Bareilly Junction	2	11:35	11:37	Chhapra Junction	2	09:35	09:45
Shahjahanpur	2	12:48	12:50	Siwan Junction	2	10:40	10:45
Lucknow Junction	2	15:20	15:30	Bhatni Junction	2	11:30	11:35
Gonda Junction	2	17:30	17:35	Deoria Sadar	2	12:00	12:05
Basti Junction	2	18:52	18:55	Gorakhpur Junction	2	13:45	13:55
Gorakhpur Junction	2	20:40	20:50	Basti Junction	2	14:59	15:02
Deoria Sadar	2	21:50	21:55	Gonda Junction	2	16:45	16:55
Bhatni Junction	2	22:13	22:15	Lucknow Junction	2	19:20	19:30
Siwan Junction	2	22:55	23:00	Shahjahanpur	2	22:18	22:20
Chhapra Junction	3	00:40	00:50	Bareilly Junction	2	23:19	23:21
Sonpur Junction	3	01:51	01:53	Moradabad Junction	3	00:38	00:46
Hajipur Junction	3	02:05	02:10	Laksar Junction	3	02:25	02:27
Muzaffarpur Junction	3	02:55	03:00	Roorkee Junction	3	02:44	02:49
Samastipur Junction	3	04:00	04:05	Saharanpur Junction	3	04:15	04:25
Barauni Junction	3	05:15	05:25	Yamunanagar Jagadhri	3	04:53	04:55
Kiul Junction	3	07:05	07:10	Ambala Cantt Junction	3	05:45	05:50
Abhaipur	3	07:31	07:33	Ludhiana Junction	3	07:26	07:36
Dharhara	3	07:44	07:46	Jalandhar Cantt Junction	3	08:24	08:29
Jamalpur Junction	3	07:59	08:04	Pathankot Cantt Junction	3	10:20	10:25
Sultanganj	3	08:34	08:36	Kathua	3	10:53	10:55
Bhagalpur	3	09:55	—	Jammu Tawi	3	13:00	—

== Coach composition ==
Category	Coaches	Total
Luggage/Parcel Rake (LPR)	LPR	1
General Unreserved (GEN)	GEN1, GEN2, GEN3, GEN4	4
AC 2 Tier (2A)	A1, A2	2
AC First Class (1A)	H1	1
AC 3 Tier (3A)	B1, B2, B3, B4, B5, B6, B7, B8	8
Pantry Car (PC)	PC	1
Sleeper Class (SL)	S1, S2, S3, S4	4
Sleeper cum Luggage Rake (SLRD) (Divyangjan)	SLRD	1
Total Coaches		22

- Primary Maintenance – Jammu Tawi CD
- Secondary Maintenance - Bhagalpur CD

== Rake sharing ==
The train shares its rake with 12587/12588 Gorakhpur–Jammu Tawi Amarnath Superfast Express.

== See also ==
- Bhagalpur Junction railway station
- Jammu Tawi railway station
- Amarnath Express
- Gorakhpur–Jammu Tawi Amarnath Superfast Express
