= Howrah–Tirupati Humsafar Express =

Indian train line

Howrah – Tirupati Humsafar Express
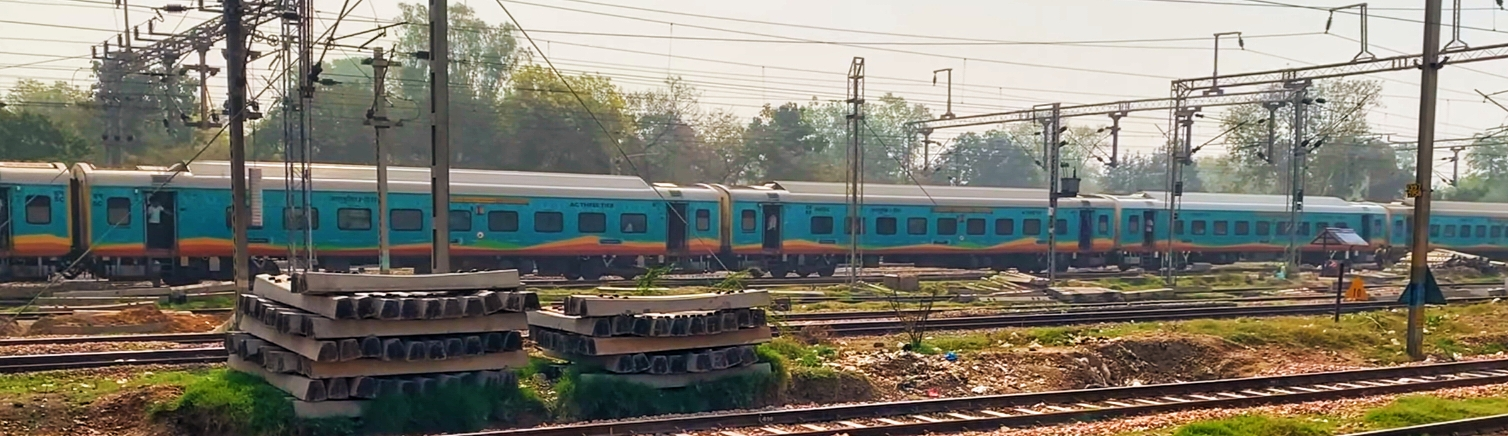

Overview
- Service type: Humsafar Express
- First service: 15 June 2017; 8 years ago
- Current operator: South Eastern Railways

Route
- Termini: Howrah (HWH); Tirupati (TPTY)
- Stops: 6
- Distance travelled: 1,617 km (1,005 mi)
- Average journey time: 26 hours 5 minutes
- Service frequency: Weekly (Note: Runs once in a week for every direction.)
- Train number: 20889 / 20890

On-board services
- Class: AC 3 tier
- Seating arrangements: No
- Sleeping arrangements: Yes
- Catering facilities: Available
- Observation facilities: Large windows

Technical
- Rolling stock: LHB Humsafar
- Track gauge: 1,676 mm (5 ft 6 in)
- Operating speed: 65 km/h (40 mph)
Route map
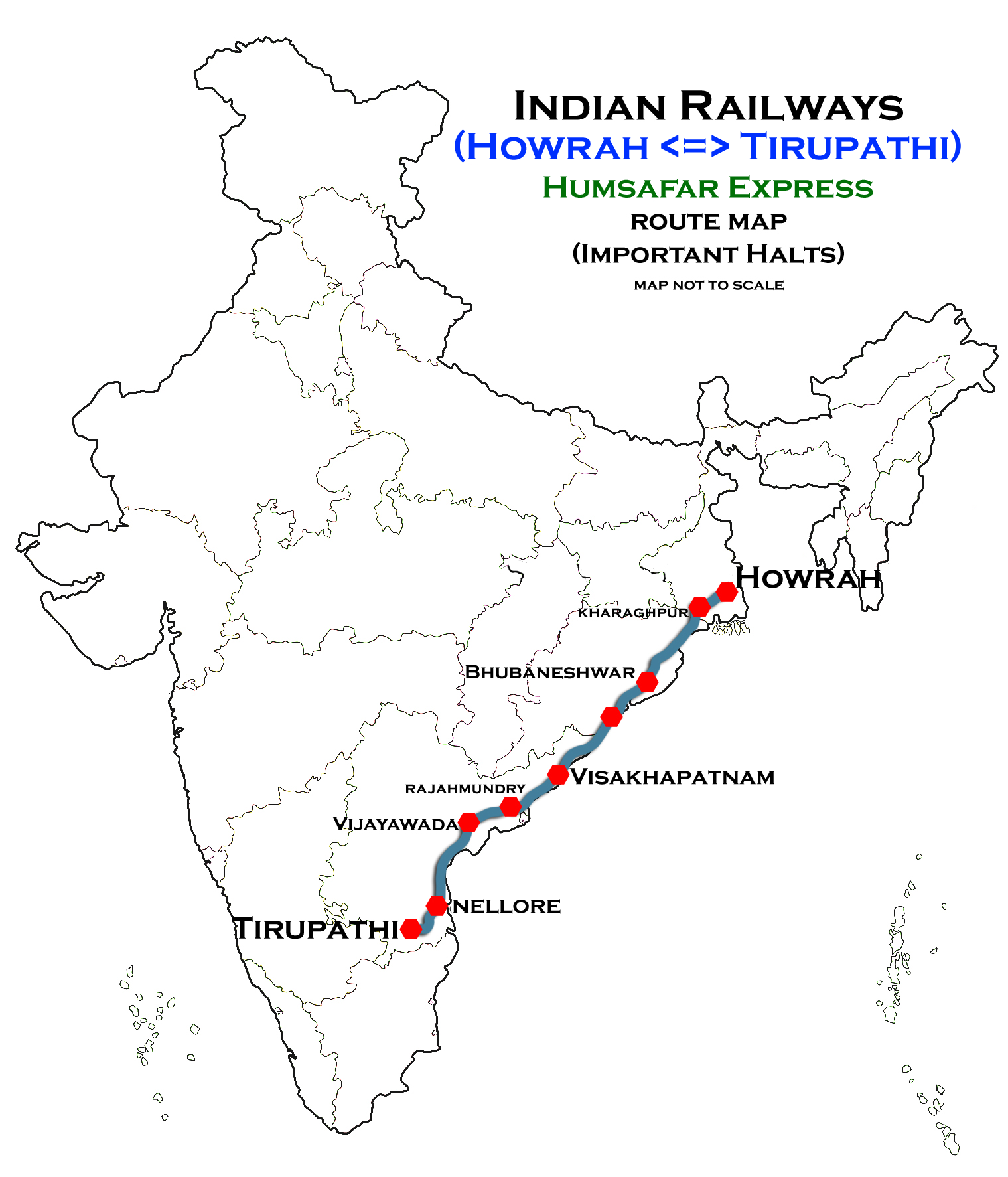

The Howrah–Tirupati Humsafar Express is a completely 3-tier AC sleeper trains of the Indian Railways connecting Howrah in West Bengal and Tirupati in Andhra Pradesh. It is currently being operated with 20889/20890 train numbers on a weekly basis.

From 23 February 2019 the train was extended from Vijayawada Junction to Tirupati and from 24 February 2019 in the reverse direction.

== Service ==
It averages 65 km/h as 20889/Howrah–Tirupati Humsafar Express starts on Saturday and covering 1617 km in 26 hrs 5 mins and 63 km/h as 20890/Tirupati–Howrah Humsafar Express starts on Sunday covering 1618 km in 26 hrs 25 mins.

== Schedule ==
Train number	Station code	Departure station	Departure time	Departure day	Arrival station	Arrival time	Arrival day
20889	HWH	Howrah Junction	12:40 PM (Afternoon)	Saturday	Tirupati	2:24 PM (Afternoon)	Sunday
20890	TPTY	Tirupati	4:15 PM	Sunday	Howrah Junction	6:30 PM	Monday

== Route & halts ==
WEST BENGAL

- Howrah
- Kharagpur Junction

ODISHA

- Cuttack Junction
- Bhubaneswar

ANDHRA PRADESH

- Vizianagaram Junction
- Visakhapatnam
- Rajahmundry
- Vijayawada Junction
- Ongole
- Nellore
- Renigunta Junction
- Tirupati

== Coaches ==
The trains is completely 3-tier AC LHB coach designed by Indian Railways with features of LED screen display to show information about stations, train speed etc. and will have announcement system as well, Vending machines for tea, coffee and milk, Bio toilets in compartments as well as CCTV cameras.

=== Composition ===
This train consists of sixteen AC III Tier coaches, one Pantry car and two Generator Power Car coaches.

- 16 AC III Tier
- 1 Pantry car
- 2 Generator Power Car

== Loco link ==
This train is hauled by a WAP-7 of Santragachi shed from Howrah to Visakhapatnam. And then from Visakhapatnam to Tirupati it is hauled by WAP-7 of Lallaguda shed.

== Rake sharing ==
The train has rake sharing with 22887/22888 Howrah–Yesvantpur Humsafar Express.

== Direction reversal ==
The train reverses its direction 1 times:

- Visakhapatnam railway station

== See also ==
- Humsafar Express
- Jammu Tawi railway station
- Tirupati railway station
- Howrah–Yesvantpur Humsafar Express
