= Bhagalpur–Muzaffarpur Jan Sewa Express =

Train in India

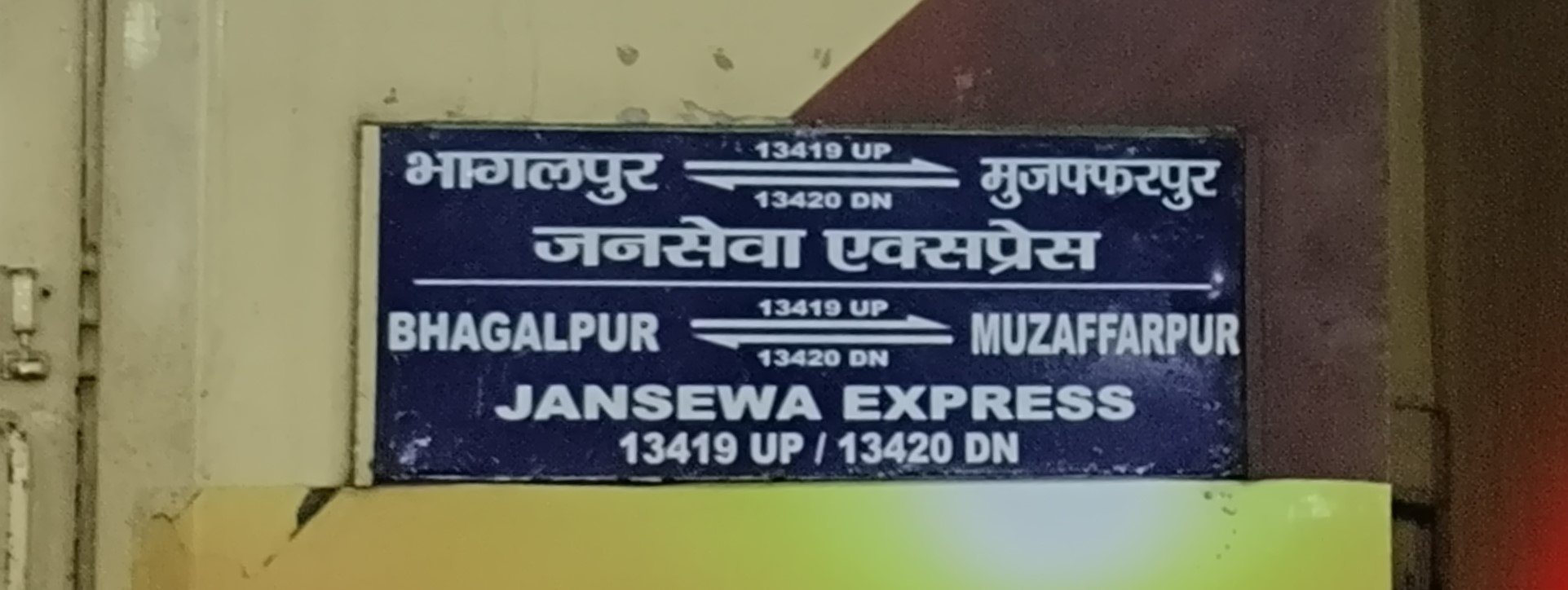
- Jan Sewa Express train board.

Overview
- Service type: Express
- Locale: Bihar
- Current operator: Eastern Railway

Route
- Termini: Bhagalpur (BGP); Muzaffarpur (MFP)
- Stops: 18
- Distance travelled: 240 km (149 mi)
- Average journey time: 6 hours 40 minutes
- Service frequency: Daily
- Train number: 13419 / 13420

On-board services
- Classes: AC 3 Tier, Sleeper Class, General Unreserved
- Seating arrangements: Yes
- Sleeping arrangements: Yes
- Catering facilities: E-Catering only
- Observation facilities: Large windows
- Entertainment facilities: No
- Baggage facilities: Below the seats
- Other facilities: Below the seats

Technical
- Rolling stock: LHB coach
- Track gauge: 1,676 mm (5 ft 6 in)
- Operating speed: 41 km/h (25 mph) average including halts.

The 13419 / 13420 Bhagalpur–Muzaffarpur Jan Sewa Express is an express train belonging to Eastern Railway zone that runs between Bhagalpur Junction and Muzaffarpur Junction in India. It is currently being operated with 13419/13420 train numbers on a daily basis.

== Service ==
The 13419/Jan Sewa Express has an average speed of 38 km/h and covers 240 km in 6h 35m. The 13420/Jan Sewa Express has an average speed of 35 km/h and covers 240 km in 6h 50m.

== Route and halts ==
| Sr. No. | Station | Code |
|---|---|---|
| 1 | Muzaffarpur Jn | MFP |
| 2 | Dholi | DOL |
| 3 | Khudiram Bose Pusa | KRBP |
| 4 | Samastipur Jn | SPJ |
| 5 | Dalsingh Sarai | DSS |
| 6 | Bachwara Jn | BCA |
| 7 | Barauni Jn | BJU |
| 8 | Barhiya | BRYA |
| 9 | Luckeesarai Jn | LKR |
| 10 | Kiul Jn | KIUL |
| 11 | Abhaipur | AHA |
| 12 | Dharhara | DRH |
| 13 | Jamalpur Jn | JMP |
| 14 | Bariarpur | BUP |
| 15 | Kalyanpur Road | KPRD |
| 16 | Sultanganj | SGG |
| 17 | Akbarnagar | AKN |
| 18 | Bhagalpur | BGP |

== Coach composition ==
Coach Composition
| Category | Coaches | Total |
|---|---|---|
| AC 3 Tier (3A) | B1, B2 | 2 |
| Sleeper Class (SL) | S1, S2, S3, S4 | 4 |
| General Unreserved (GEN) | GEN1, GEN2, GEN3, GEN4, GEN5, GEN6, GEN7, GEN8, GEN9 | 9 |
| Seating cum Luggage Rake (SLR) | SLR, EoG | 2 |
| Total Coaches | | 17 |

- Primary Maintenance - Bhagalpur Coaching Depot.

== Traction ==
Both trains are hauled by a Ghaziabad Loco Shed-based WAP-7 electric locomotive from Bhagalpur to Muzaffarpur and vice versa.

== See also ==
- Bhagalpur Junction railway station
- Muzaffarpur Junction railway station
- Saharsa–Amritsar Jan Sewa Express
