= Sarobag Halt railway station =

Railway station in Bihar, India

Sarobag Halt

General information
- Location: Jamalpur-Dharhara Road, Khirodharpur, Munger district, Bihar; India
- Coordinates: 25°16′22″N 86°28′34″E
- Elevation: 47 m (154 ft)
- System: Passenger train station
- Owner: Indian Railways
- Operator: Eastern Railway zone
- Line: Sahibganj loop line
- Platforms: 2
- Tracks: 2

Construction
- Structure type: Standard (on ground station)

Other information
- Status: Active
- Station code: SRB
- Zone(s): Eastern Railway zone
- Division(s): Malda

History
- Former names: East Indian Railway Company

Services
Preceding station	Indian Railways	Following station
Jamalpur Junction towards Khana	Eastern Railway zone Sahibganj loop	Dasharathpur towards Kiul Junction
Location

Sarobag Halt railway station is a halt railway station on Sahibganj loop line under the Malda railway division of Eastern Railway zone. It is situated beside Jamalpur-Dharhara Road at Khirodharpur in Munger district in the Indian state of Bihar.
