= Pawan Express =

Train in India

Lokmanya Tilak Terminus– Jaynagar Express
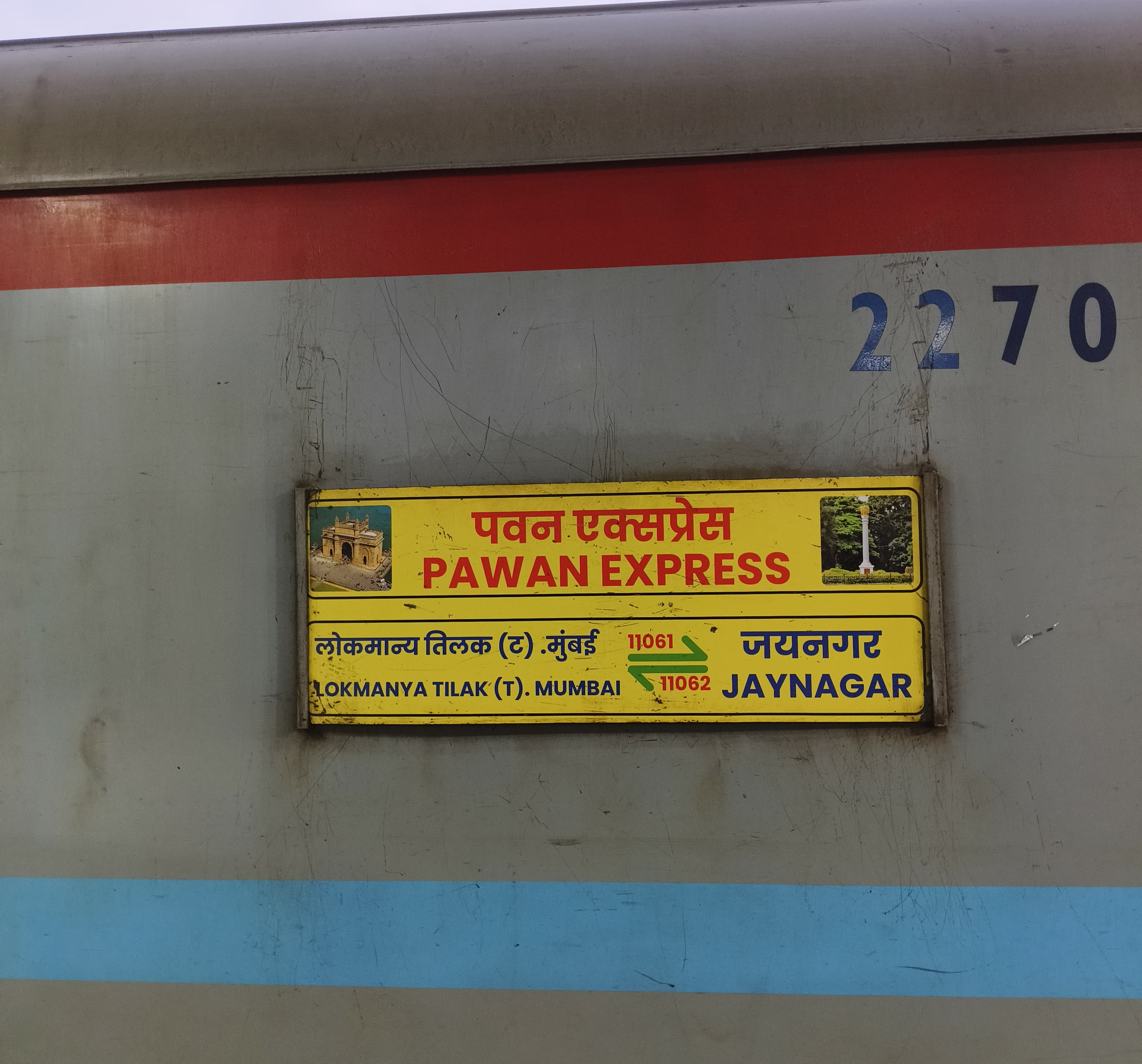
- Train Board

Overview
- Service type: Express
- Current operator: Central Railways

Route
- Termini: Lokmanya Tilak Terminus; Jaynagar railway station
- Stops: 43
- Distance travelled: 1,941 km (1,206 mi)
- Average journey time: 36 h 55 min as 11061 Lokmanya Tilak Terminus–Jaynagar Pawan Express, 36 h 55 min as 11062 Jaynagar–Lokmanya Tilak Terminus Pawan Express.
- Service frequency: 11061 Lokmanya Tilak Terminus–Jaynagar Pawan Express – Daily. 11062 Jaynagar–Lokmanya Tilak Terminus Pawan Express – Daily.
- Train number: 11061/11062

On-board services
- Classes: AC 2 tier, AC 3 tier, Sleeper class, General Unreserved
- Seating arrangements: Yes
- Sleeping arrangements: Yes
- Catering facilities: Yes

Technical
- Rolling stock: LHB coach
- Track gauge: 1,676 mm (5 ft 6 in)
- Electrification: Partial
- Operating speed: 120 km/h (75 mph) maximum 51.00 km/h (32 mph) including halts.
Route map
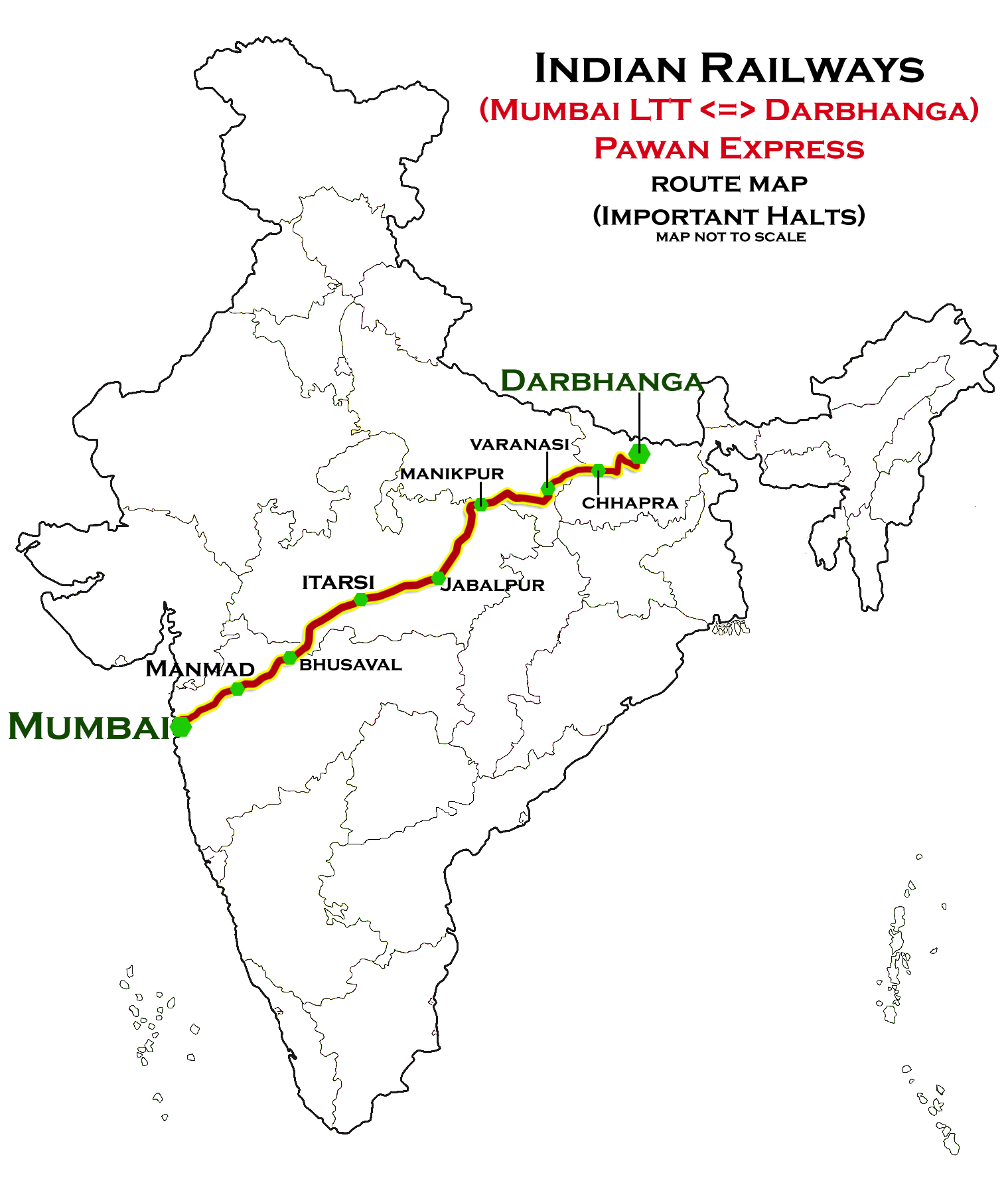

The 11061/11062 Pawan Express is an Express train belonging to Central Railway zone that runs between Lokmanya Tilak Terminus of Maharashtra & Jaynagar of Bihar in India.

It operates as train number 11061 from Lokmanya Tilak Terminus to Jaynagar railway station and as train number 11062 in the reverse direction serving the states of Maharashtra, Madhya Pradesh, Uttar Pradesh and Bihar .

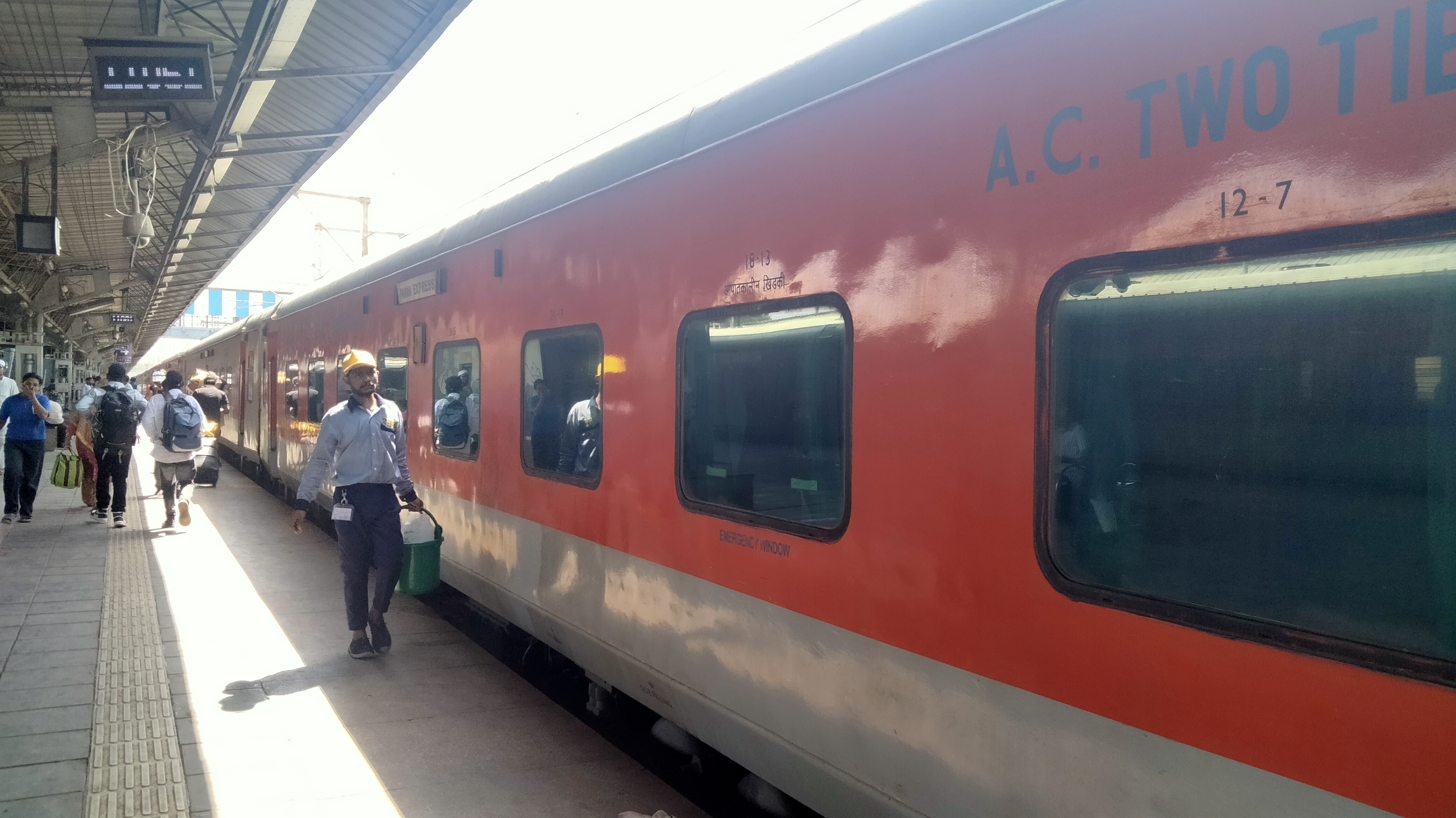
Lokmanya Tilak Terminus– Jaynagar Terminus Express Train also known as Pawan Express Train (11061)

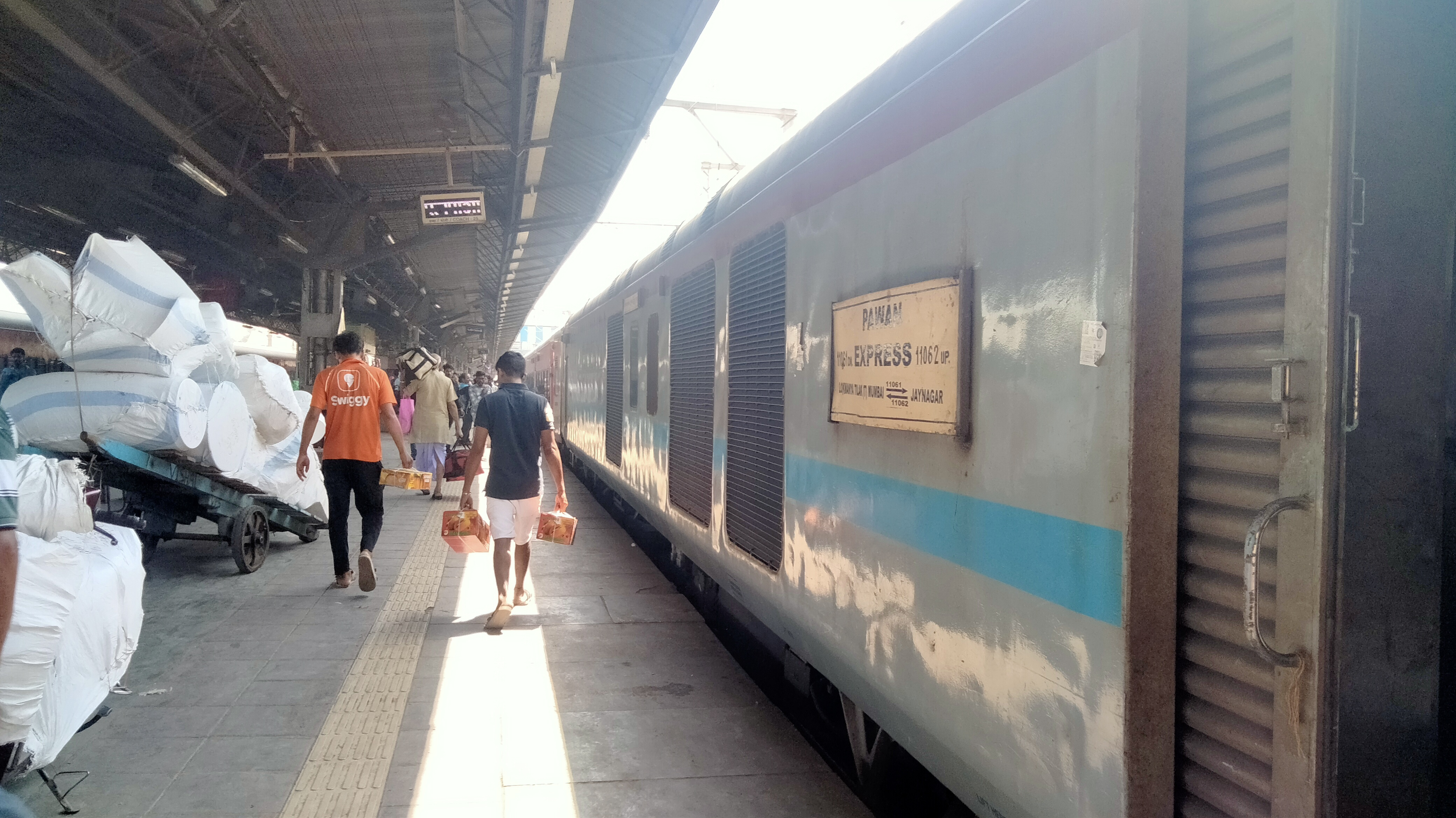
Pawan Express Train at Lokmanya Tilak Terminus in Mumbai

== History ==
Pawan Express (Train No. 11065/66) originally ran between Lokmanya Tilak Terminus Muzaffarpur Pawan Express. It used to share its rake with another train that ran between Lokmanya Tilak Terminus–Darbhanga Pawan Express

Later, the LTT–Darbhanga Pawan Express was merged with the LTT–Muzaffarpur Pawan Express and the route was extended to Jaynagar (beyond Darbhanga).

== Coach composition ==
Coach Composition of Pawan Express
Coach Type	Number of Coaches
Sleeper Class (SL)	8
AC 3-Tier (3A)	6
AC 2-Tier (2A)	1
General Unreserved (GEN)	4
SLRD & Luggage/Parcel Van (SLRD & LPR)	2
Pantry Car (PC)	1

== Schedule ==
🚆 Train Schedule: Pawan Express
Train No.	Station Code	Departure Station	🕖 Departure Time	📅 Departure Day	Arrival Station	🕒 Arrival Time	📅 Arrival Day
11061	LTT (Mumbai)	Lokmanaya Tilak	11:30 AM	Daily	Jaynagar	2:00 AM	Daily
11062	JYG	Jaynagar	1:10 PM	Daily	LTT Mumbai	12:30 AM	Saturday

== Routeing ==
Pawan Express (11061) Major Route
No.	Station Code	Station Name	State
1	LTT	Lokmanya Tilak Terminus	Maharashtra
2	TNA	Thane	Maharashtra
3	KYN	Kalyan Junction	Maharashtra
4	IGP	Igatpuri	Maharashtra
5	NK	Nashik	Maharashtra
6	MMR	Manmad Junction	Maharashtra
7	CSN	Chalisgaon Junction	Maharashtra
8	PC	Pachora Junction	Maharashtra
9	JL	Jalgaon Junction	Maharashtra
10	BSL	Bhusaval Junction	Maharashtra
11	BAU	Burhanpur	Madhya Pradesh
12	KNW	Khandwa Junction	Madhya Pradesh
13	ET	Itarsi Junction	Madhya Pradesh
14	PPI	Pipariya	Madhya Pradesh
15	NU	Narsinghpur	Madhya Pradesh
16	JBP	Jabalpur Junction	Madhya Pradesh
17	KTE	Katni Junction	Madhya Pradesh
18	MYR	Maihar	Madhya Pradesh
19	STA	Satna Junction	Madhya Pradesh
20	MKP	Manikpur Junction	Uttar Pradesh
21	NYN	Naini	Uttar Pradesh
22	PRYJ	Prayagraj Junction	Uttar Pradesh
23	GYN	Gyanpur Road	Uttar Pradesh
24	BSB	Varanasi Junction	Uttar Pradesh
25	ARJ	Aunrihar Junction	Uttar Pradesh
26	GCT	Ghazipur City	Uttar Pradesh
27	YFP	Yusufpur	Uttar Pradesh
28	BUI	Ballia	Uttar Pradesh
29	SIP	Suraimanpur	Uttar Pradesh
30	CPR	Chhapra Junction	Bihar
31	DGA	Dighwara	Bihar
32	SEE	Sonpur Junction	Bihar
33	HJP	Hajipur Junction	Bihar
34	BNR	Bhagwanpur	Bihar
35	MFP	Muzaffarpur Junction	Bihar
36	SPJ	Samastipur Junction	Bihar
37	LSI	Laheria Sarai	Bihar
38	DBG	Darbhanga Junction	Bihar
39	JYG	Jaynagar	Bihar

== Traction ==
earlier was WDP-3A. As sections of the route are yet to be fully electrified, until 2020 an Itarsi-based WAP-4 hauled the train from Lokmanya Tilak Terminus until Itarsi Junction after which a pair of Itarsi-based WDM-3A or WDP-4 hauled the train for the remainder of its journey..

== See also ==
- Lokmanya Tilak Terminus
- Bhagalpur–Lokmanya Tilak Terminus Superfast Express
- Lokmanya Tilak Terminus–Darbhanga Pawan Express
- Avadh Express
