= Dharhara (community development block) =

Dharhara धरहरा सामुदायिक विकास खंड
- Comuniity Development Block
- Located in Bihar, India
- Coordinates: 25.256088°N 86.41173°E
- Country: India
- State: Bihar
- District: Munger

Government
  - Type: Community development block

Population (2001)
  - Total: 103,919

Languages
  - Official: Angika, Hindi
- Time zone: UTC+5:30 (IST)
- PIN: 811212
- Telephone code: 06344
- ISO 3166 code: IN-BR
- Literacy: 41.36%

Dharhara is a community development block (an administrative division) in Munger District of Bihar, India.

== History ==
Kali temple was built in the year 1326.

Arya samaj mandir, Amari, estd.1936

== Company & Factories ==
1. RBS ENGINEERING COMPANY
2. News War (National Hindi News paper) website: www.newswarindia.com

== Divisions ==
Panchayats under the Dharhara block include:

- Ajimganj
- Amari
- Aurabagicha
- Bahachouki (or Barichak)
- Bangalwa
- Dharhara Maharna
- Dharhara South
- Etawa
- Hemjapur
- Mahagama
- Matadih
- Sarobag
- Shivkund

== Religion ==
The population of the block (village) is a mix of peoples from community consisting of Hindus, Muslims & Christians among other denominations, all living in peaceful co-existence.

== Transport ==
- Rail - Dharhara railway station is situated on Sahibganj Loop line. Dharhara is well connected by rail in Eastern Railway Zone (India) via Kiul junction in west & Jamalpur in east.
- Road - Munger (via Jamalpur, Bihar) is around one hours travel from Dharhara by road.
- Air - The nearest airport is at Patna, around four hours from Dharhara by rail.

== Education/Sports ==
1. Major educational institute is the 50 years old high school (Kumar Ramanand Smarak High School).
2. RBS Youth Club. (Royal Bihar Sports Youth Club).
3. Shri Shankar Sporting Club.
