= Vikramshila Express =

Train in India

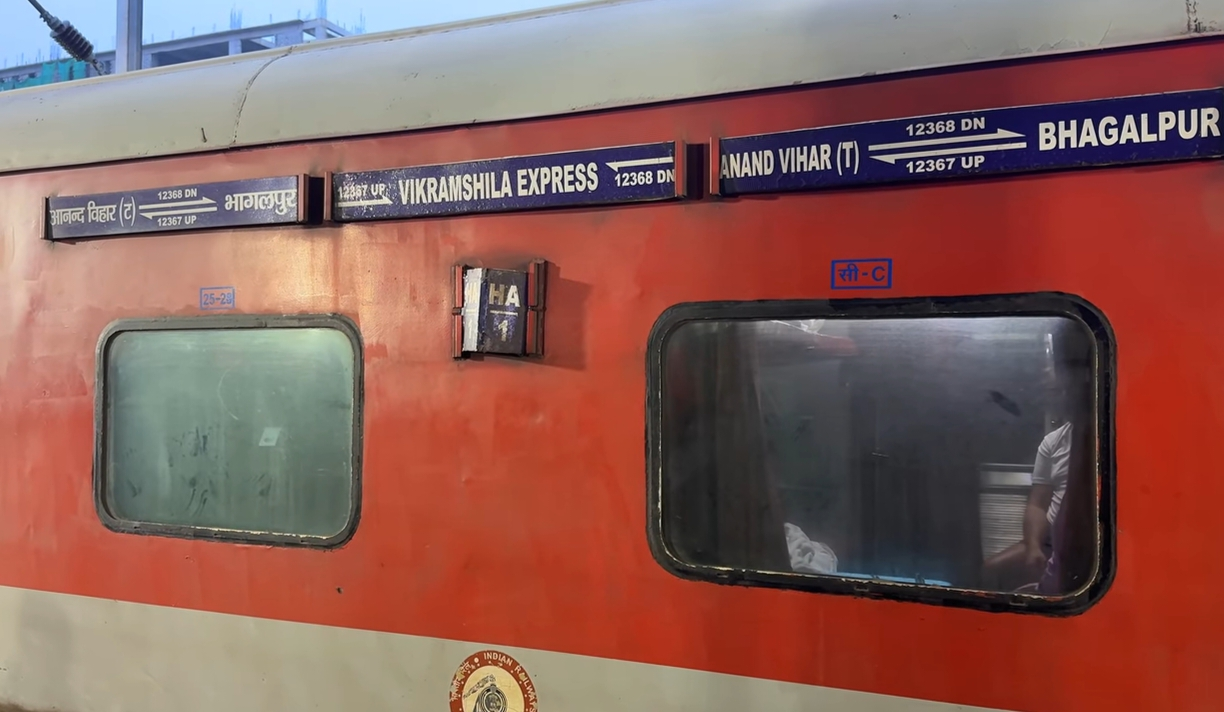
- Vikramshila Express At Prayagraj Junction

Overview
- Service type: Superfast Express
- First service: 6 March 1977; 49 years ago
- Current operator: Eastern Railway

Route
- Termini: Bhagalpur Junction (BGP); Anand Vihar Terminal (ANVT)
- Stops: 23
- Distance travelled: 1,208 km (751 mi)
- Average journey time: 19 hours
- Service frequency: Daily
- Train number: 12367 / 12368

On-board services
- Classes: AC First Class, AC 2 Tier, AC 3 Tier, AC 3 Tier Economy, Sleeper Class, Unreserved General
- Seating arrangements: Yes
- Sleeping arrangements: Yes
- Catering facilities: Available
- Observation facilities: Large windows
- Baggage facilities: Available
- Other facilities: Below the seats

Technical
- Rolling stock: LHB coach
- Track gauge: 1,676 mm (5 ft 6 in)
- Operating speed: 64 km/h (40 mph) average including halts
Route map
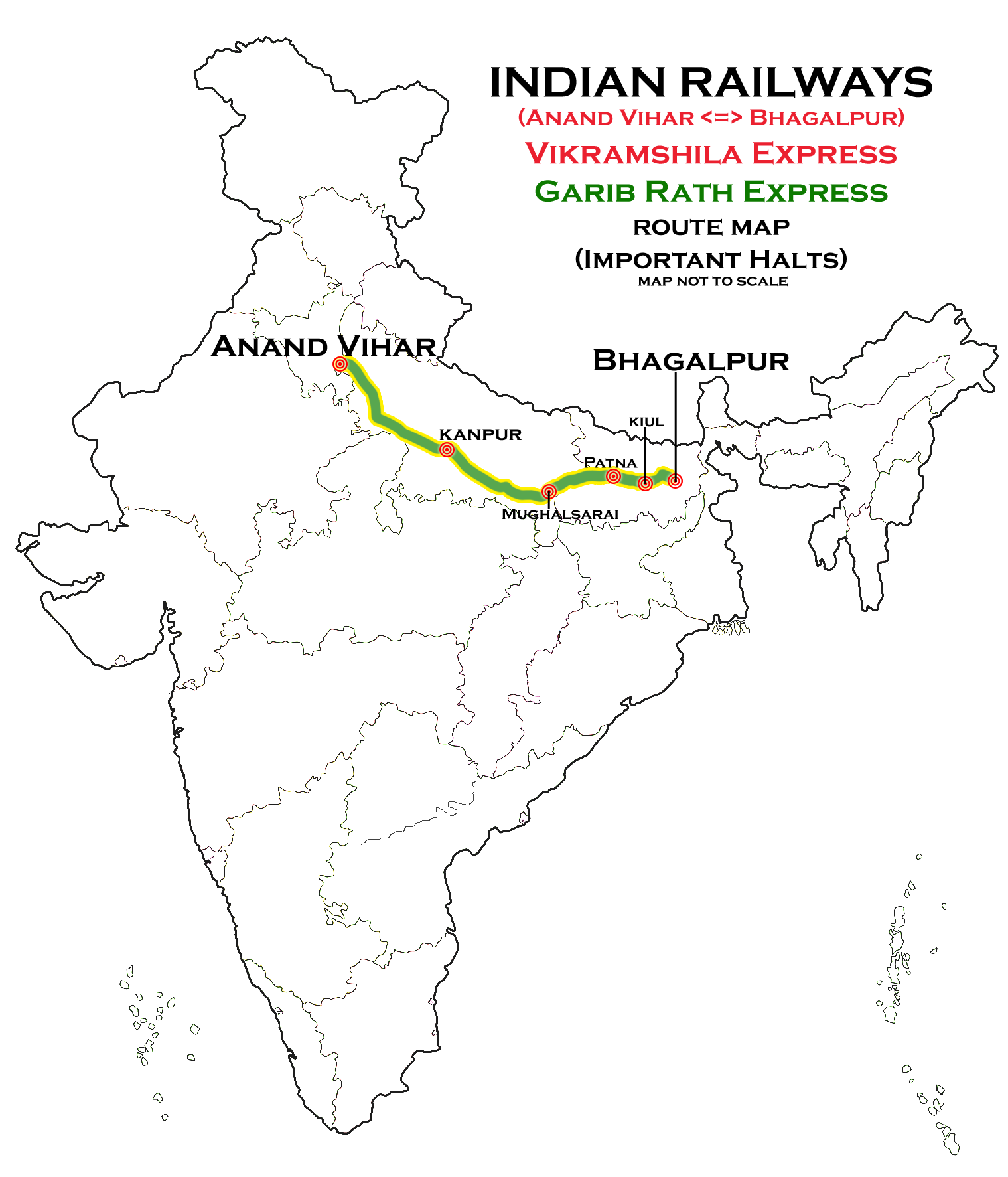

12367 / 12368 Vikramshila Express is a daily superfast express train service that connects Bhagalpur, one of the largest cities of Bihar to India's capital New Delhi (Anand Vihar Terminal). The train passes through the cities of Kanpur,Pt. Deen Dayal Upadhyay Jn., Lakhisarai, Patna, Bakhtiyarpur, Mokama, Kiul Junction and Jamalpur, before ending its journey at Bhagalpur.

Vikramshila Express runs at a maximum permissible speed of 130 km/h.

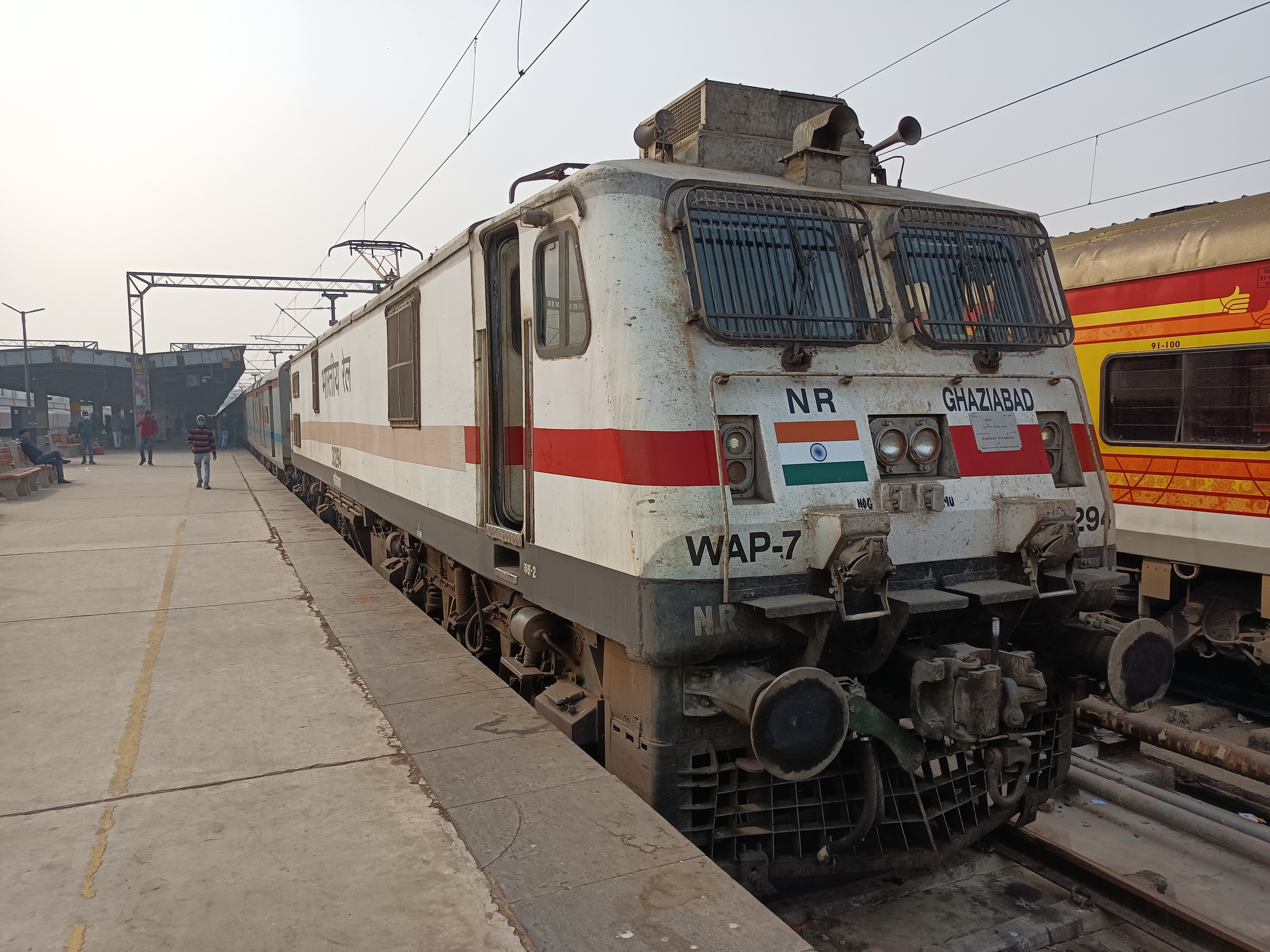
Ghaziabad-based WAP-7 locomotive at Anand Vihar Terminal with the Anand Vihar-Bhagalpur Vikramshila Express train

== Train number ==
- 12367: Bhagalpur to Anand Vihar Terminal
- 12368: Anand Vihar Terminal to Bhagalpur

== History ==
Vikramshila Express was inaugurated on 6 March 1977 between Bhagalpur and New Delhi. After the introduction of Magadh Express in 1980, Vikramshila ran from Bhagalpur to Patna Junction and from Patna, the coaches of Vikramshila were attached to Magadh Express and the train was then named Magadh Express, which used to leave Patna Jn. at 8:00 pm.

Later on when Mr. Nitish Kumar became the Railway Minister of India, he gave back Vikramshila Express its own existence and since then Vikramshila Express again runs from Bhagalpur to Anand Vihar on its own name. This was a great relief for the passengers of Bhagalpur, Sultanganj, Bariarpur, Jamalpur Junction, Hathidah Junction, Mokama Junction Lakhisarai, and Mokama.

Vikramshila Express is the most important train for Bhagalpur region. This train is for the ease of the people of Bhagalpur, Jamalpur and nearby areas to travel to Delhi.

Vikramshila Express started running end-to-end with a WAP-7 electric locomotive from Bhagalpur Junction to Anand Vihar Terminal from 3 June 2019 and vice-versa from 1 June 2019. It started using LHB coach from 12 July 2017 and got an MPS upgrade from 110 km/h to 130 km/h on 18 February 2020.

== Timetable ==
- 12367 Vikramshila Express departs from Bhagalpur at 11:55 hrs & arrives Anand Vihar at 07:20hrs.
- 12368 Vikramshila Express departs from Anand Vihar at 13:15hrs & arrives Bhagalpur at 08:15hrs.

== Traction ==
Earlier was Gonda-based WDM-3A. As the entire route is now fully electrified, Vikramshila Express runs with a HOG-equipped WAP-7 locomotive of Ghaziabad Electric Loco Shed from Anand Vihar Terminal to Bhagalpur Junction and vice versa.

== Route and halts ==
- Bhagalpur Junction
- Sultanganj
- Bariarpur
- Jamalpur Junction
- Dharhara
- Abhaipur
- Kajra
- Kiul Junction
- Lakhisarai Junction
- Barhiya
- Hathidah Junction
- Mokama Junction
- Barh
- Bakhtiyarpur Junction
- Khusropur
- Fatuha Junction
- Patna Sahib
- Patna Junction
- Ara Junction
- Buxar
- Pt. Deen Dayal Upadhyay Jn.
- Kanpur Central
- Anand Vihar Terminal
