= Anga Express =

Train in India

Overview
- Service type: Superfast
- First service: 1 December 2008; 17 years ago
- Current operator: South Western Railway

Route
- Termini: SMVT Bengaluru (SMVB); Bhagalpur Junction (BGP)
- Stops: 27
- Distance travelled: 2,476 km (1,539 mi)
- Average journey time: 43 hrs 30 mins
- Service frequency: Weekly
- Train number: 12253 / 12254

On-board services
- Classes: AC 2 tier, AC 3 tier, Sleeper class, General Unreserved
- Seating arrangements: Yes
- Sleeping arrangements: Yes
- Catering facilities: Available
- Observation facilities: Large windows
- Baggage facilities: No
- Other facilities: Below the seats

Technical
- Rolling stock: LHB coach
- Track gauge: 1,676 mm (5 ft 6 in)
- Operating speed: 130 km/h (81 mph) Maximum, 58 km/h (36 mph) average including halts.
Route map
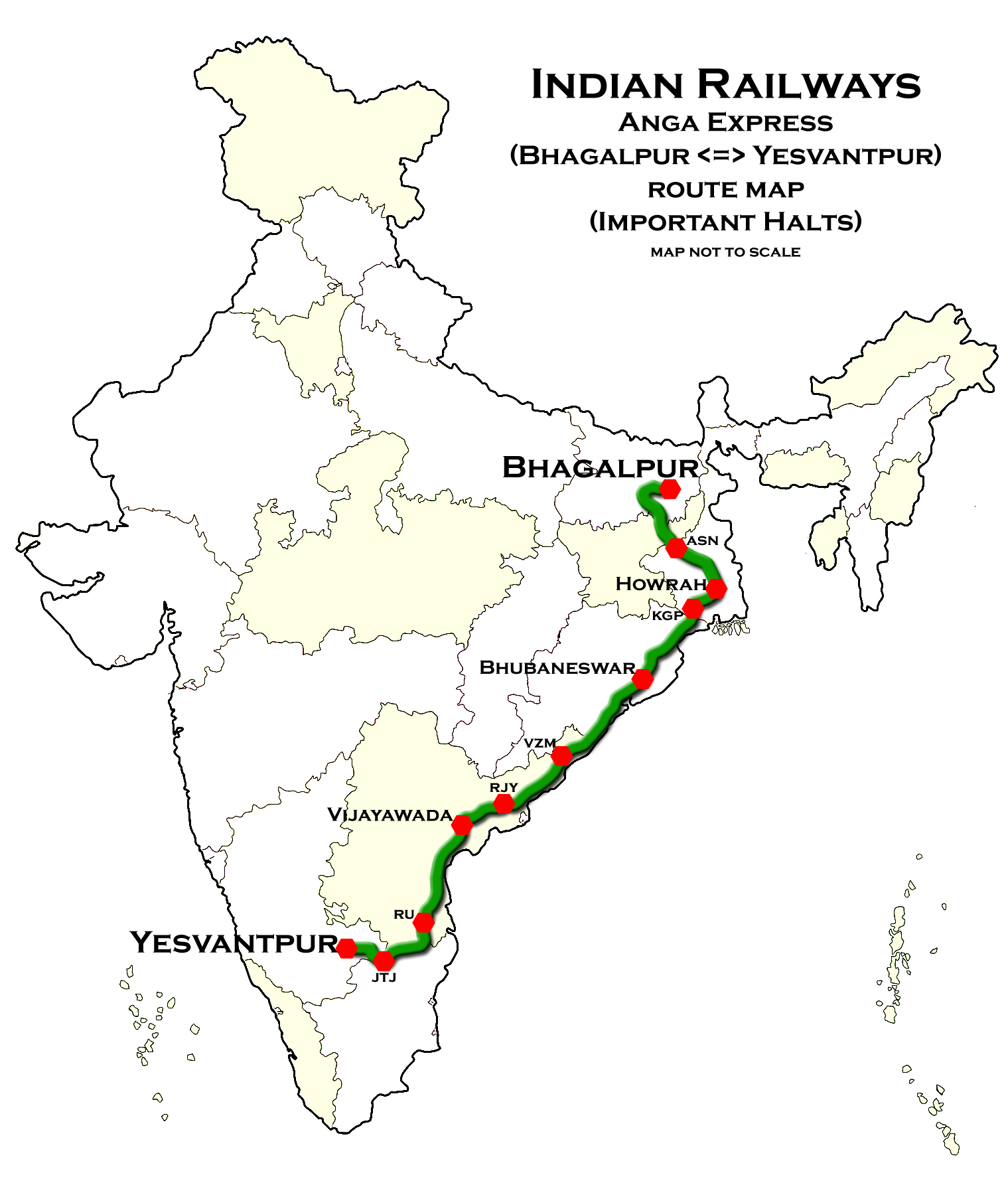
- Anga Express route map

The 12253 / 12254 Anga Express is a train connecting Bhagalpur, the second largest city of Bihar, to Sir M. Visvesvaraya Terminal, Bengaluru (SMVB) in Bangalore, via Munger's Jamalpur Junction, Kolkata's Dankuni Junction, Bhubaneswar, Visakhapatnam and Vijayawada. In February 2017, the train was provided with the new LHB coach.

== History ==
The Anga Express was introduced because of the growing demand for the train service from the Anga region to Bangalore. Many of the software professionals working in Bangalore were from the districts of Munger and Bhagalpur. Prior to the Anga Express, they used to travel to Bangalore on the Sanghamithra Superfast Express or the Howrah–SMVT Bengaluru Humsafar Express.

== Timing ==
- 12253 – Starts from Sir M. Visvesvaraya Terminal, Bengaluru every Saturday at 13:30 HRS IST and reaches Bhagalpur Junction Monday at 8:45 AM IST
- 12254 – Starts from Bhagalpur Junction every Wednesday and reaches Sir M. Visvesvaraya Terminal, Bengaluru on Friday at 9:05 AM IST.

== Direction reversals ==
The train reverses its direction twice at:

- Visakhapatnam,
- Kiul Junction.

== Route & halts ==
- Bhagalpur Junction
- Kiul Junction
- Jasidih Junction
- Asansol Junction
- Barddhaman Junction
- Dankuni Junction
- Kharagpur Junction
- Balasore
- Cuttack Junction
- Bhubaneswar
- Khurda Road Junction
- Brahmapur
- Vizianagaram Junction
- Visakhapatnam
- Rajahmundry
- Vijayawada Junction
- Nellore
- Gudur Junction
- Renigunta Junction
- Katpadi Junction
- Jolarpettai Junction
- Krishnarajapuram
- SMVT Bengaluru

== Traction ==
earlier was Santragachi-based WAP-4. It is hauled by a Tatanagar Loco Shed or Santragachi Loco Shed-based WAP-7 or WAP-4 electric locomotive from BGP to VSKP. From VSKP to SMVB it is hauled by a Lallaguda Loco Shed or Royapuram Loco Shed-based WAP-7 and WAP-4 electric locomotive and vice versa.
