= Gorakhpur–Jammu Tawi Amarnath Superfast Express =

Train in India

Gorakhpur-Jammu Tawi Amarnath Superfast Express
Overview
- Service type: Superfast Express
- First service: 1 May 1989; 37 years ago
- Current operator: Northern Railway

Route
- Termini: Gorakhpur (GKP); Jammu Tawi (JAT)
- Stops: 16
- Distance travelled: 1,247 km (775 mi)
- Average journey time: 22 hrs 15 mins
- Service frequency: Weekly (Note: Runs one day in a week for every direction.)
- Train number: 12587 / 12588

On-board services
- Classes: AC 2 tier, AC 3 tier, Sleeper class, General Unreserved
- Seating arrangements: No
- Sleeping arrangements: Yes
- Catering facilities: Pantry car, On-board catering, E-catering
- Observation facilities: Large windows
- Baggage facilities: No
- Other facilities: Below the seats

Technical
- Rolling stock: LHB coach
- Track gauge: 1,676 mm (5 ft 6 in)
- Operating speed: 56 km/h (35 mph) average including halts

The 12587 / 12588 Gorakhpur-Jammu Tawi Amarnath Superfast Express is an Superfast Express train belonging to Northern Railway zone that runs between Gorakhpur Junction and Jammu Tawi in India. It is currently being operated with 12587/12588 train numbers on a weekly basis.

== Service ==
The 12587/Amarnath Express has an average speed of 56 km/h and covers 1247 km in 22h 15m. The 12588/Amarnath Express Express has an average speed of 58 km/h and covers 1247 km in 21h 40m.

== Route and halts ==
The important halts of the train are:

- Gorakhpur Junction
- Basti
- Gonda Junction
- Lucknow Charbagh
- Bareilly Junction
- Moradabad Junction
- Laksar Junction
- Roorkee
- Saharanpur Junction
- Yamunanagar-Jagadhri
- Ambala Cantonment Junction
- Ludhiana Junction
- Jalandhar Cantonment Junction
- Pathankot Cantonment
- Kathua
- Jammu Tawi

== Coach composition ==
The train has standard ICF rakes with a maximum speed of 110 km/h. The train consists of 24 coaches:

- 1 AC III Tier
- 3 AC III Tier
- 13 Sleeper coaches
- 1 Pantry car
- 4 General Unreserved
- 2 Seating cum Luggage Rake

== Traction ==
Both trains are hauled by a Ghaziabad Loco Shed based WAP-7 electric locomotive from Gorakhpur to Jammu Tawi and vice versa.

== Rake sharing ==
The train shares its rake with 15097/15098 Bhagalpur–Jammu Tawi Amarnath Express.

== See also ==
- Gorakhpur Junction railway station
- Jammu Tawi railway station
- Amarnath Express
- Bhagalpur–Jammu Tawi Amarnath Express
