= Agartala–SMVT Bengaluru Humsafar Express =

Train in India

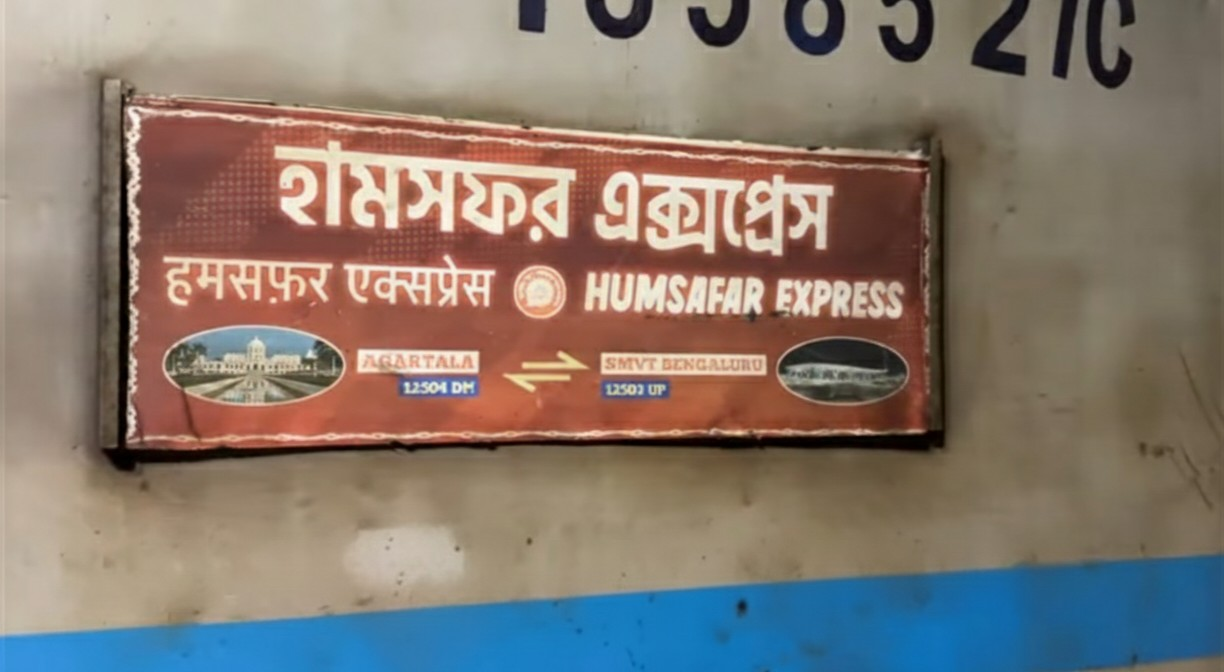
- BNC–AGTL HumSafar Express trainboard

Overview
- Service type: Humsafar Express
- First service: 5 January 2018; 8 years ago
- Current operator: Northeast Frontier Railway

Route
- Termini: Agartala (AGTL); Sir M. Visvesvaraya Terminal, Bengaluru (SMVB)
- Stops: 29
- Distance travelled: 3,529 km (2,193 mi)
- Average journey time: 62 hr 40 min
- Service frequency: Bi-weekly
- Train number: 12503 / 12504

On-board services
- Class: AC 3 tier
- Seating arrangements: No
- Sleeping arrangements: Yes
- Catering facilities: Available
- Observation facilities: Large windows

Technical
- Rolling stock: LHB Humsafar
- Track gauge: 1,676 mm (5 ft 6 in)
- Operating speed: 65.66 km/h (40.80 mph)
Route map
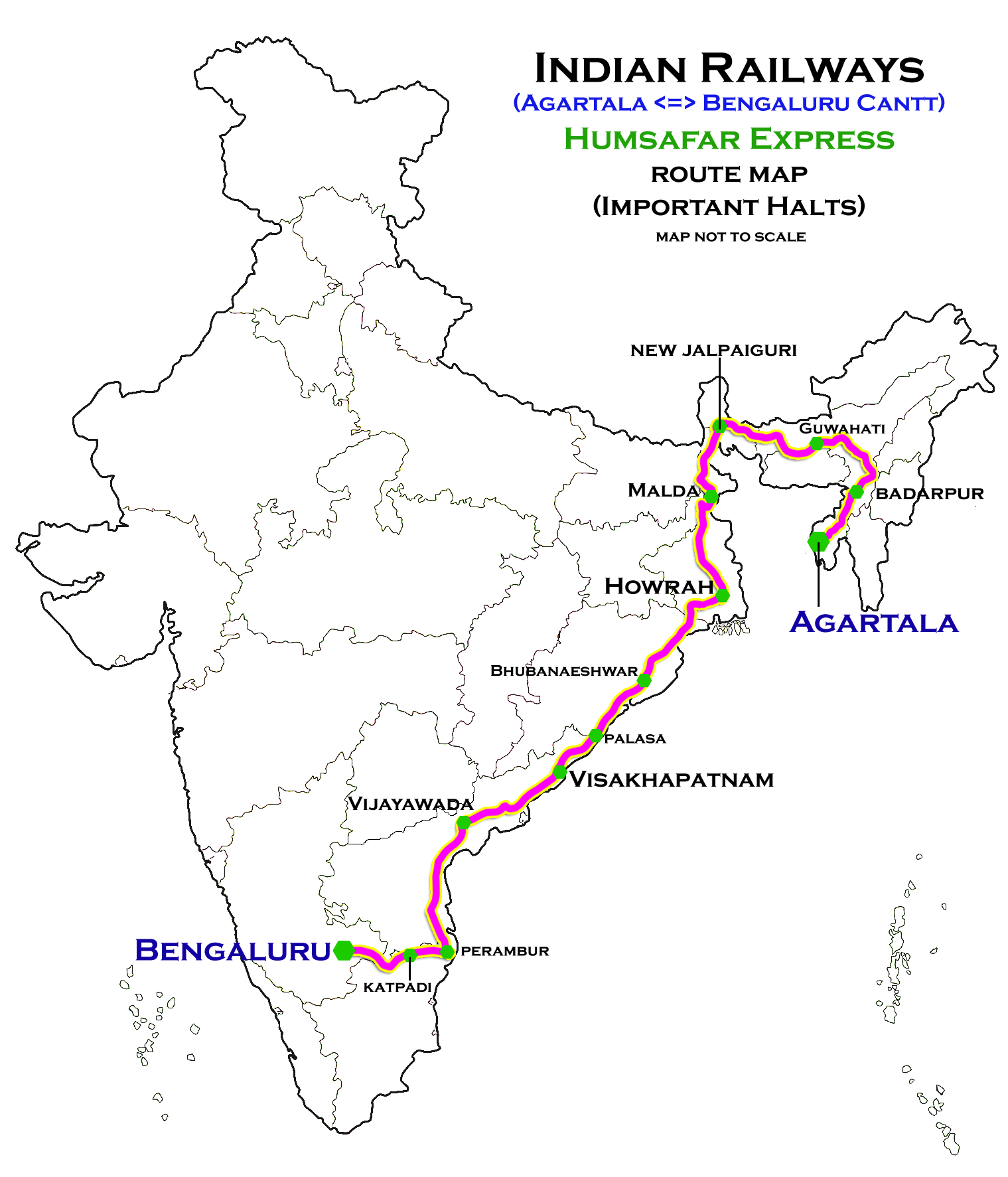

The 12504/12503 Agartala–SMVT Bengaluru Humsafar Express is the longest-running Humsafar Express and 7th longest train service of Indian Railways, It is a fully air conditioned express train, connecting Sir M. Visvesvaraya Terminal, Bengaluru, the capital city of Karnataka and Agartala railway station, Agartala, the capital city of Tripura via Guwahati, New Bongaigaon Jn.,New Jalpaiguri, Malda Town, Rampurhat, Kharagpur, Visakhapatnam Jn, Vijayawada Jn. It is currently being operated with 12503/12504 train numbers on a weekly basis. The train runs through states of Karnataka, Tamil Nadu, Andhra Pradesh, Odisha, West Bengal, Bihar, Assam and Tripura. On its journey the train also touches some parts of Jharkhand in Pakur district but does not have the stoppage there. Due to its lengthy route, the train frequently suffers from major delays.

== Coach composition ==
This train consists of sixteen AC III Tier coaches, one Pantry car and two Generator Power Car coaches. And it was hauled by WAG-5 or WAP-7 and WAP-4 even with WDP-4D

Coach Position
Loco	1	2	3	4	5	6	7	8	9	10	11	12	13	14	15	16	17	18	19
	GC	B1	B2	B3	B4	B5	B6	B7	PC	B8	B9	B10	B10	B11	B12	B13	B14	B16	GC

== Important halts ==
Some important halts of this train are :

Guwahati, New Bongaigaon Junction, New Jalpaiguri, Malda Town, Rampurhat Junction, Kharagpur Junction, Bhubaneswar, Visakhapatnam Junction etc.

== Service ==
It averages 65 km/h as 12503 Humsafar Express starts on Tuesday and covers 3529 km in 64 hrs 35 mins and it averages 66 km/h as 12504 Humsafar Express starts on Saturday and covers 3529 km in 62 hrs 20mins.

== See also ==
- Bangalore Cantonment–Kamakhya Humsafar Express
- Bhubaneswar–Krishnarajapuram Humsafar Express
- Nagaon Express
- Chennai–New Jalpaiguri Superfast Express
- Guwahati–Bengaluru Cantt. Superfast Express
- Thiruvananthapuram–Silchar Superfast Express
- New Tinsukia–Bengaluru Weekly Express
- Dibrugarh–Kanyakumari Vivek Express
