= Bhagalpur Junction railway station =

Railway station in Bhagalpur, Bihar, India

BHAGALPUR JUNCTION

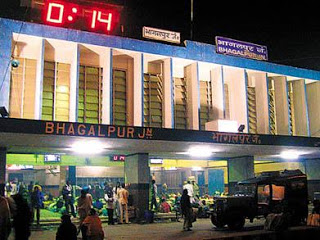

General information
- Location: India
- Coordinates: 25°14′29″N 86°58′21″E
- Elevation: 50 metres (160 ft)
- System: Indian Railways station
- Owner: Indian Railways
- Operator: Eastern Railways
- Lines: Sahibganj loop Bhagalpur–Dumka–Rampurhat line Bhagalpur–Banka–Deoghar line Bhagalpur–Hansdiha–Godda line
- Platforms: 6
- Tracks: 7

Construction
- Structure type: At grade
- Parking: Available
- Cycle facilities: Available
- Accessible: Available

Other information
- Status: Functioning
- Station code: BGP
- Zone(s): Eastern Railway
- Division(s): Malda

History
- Opened: 1861; 165 years ago
- Electrified: 2019; 7 years ago

Passengers
- 200,000 per day (▲ high)

Services
Location
- Location within Bihar
- Interactive map

Bhagalpur Junction railway station (station code: BGP), is an A-1 category railway station serving the city of Bhagalpur in the Bhagalpur district of Indian state of Bihar. It comes under jurisdiction of Malda Railway Division of Eastern Railway Zone of Indian Railways. Bhagalpur Railway Station is among the 148 important stations that have been selected for redevelopment with world-class infrastructure having an airport like look. Ministry of Railways has approved its master plan for redevelopment at a cost of 481.60 crores and tender is in process. A new Bhagalpur station will also be built near the bypass (Chaudharidih village) at a cost of 200 crores.

Trains such as Bhagalpur - Howrah Vande Bharat Express, Vikramshila Express, Bhagalpur–Lokmanya Tilak Terminus Superfast Express, Bhagalpur–Jammu Tawi Amarnath Express, Anga Express, etc originate from this station.

== History ==
Bhagalpur Junction railway station is connected to most of the major cities in India by the railway network. It lies in the Sahibganj loop which serves Bhagalpur with numerous trains. It is the third busiest line in Bihar. About 96 pairs of Mail / Express, Passenger trains pass through this line. Bhagalpur Junction is an A1 grade railway station having 6 Number of Platforms and Electrified double-line section.

It is the highest revenue generator in the Malda railway division. It is the third major railway station in Eastern Railway after Howrah and Sealdah. Bhagalpur is well connected to Delhi, Mumbai, Howrah, Bangalore, Ajmer, Kanpur Central, Patna, Muzaffarpur,Katihar, Guwahati, Surat, Jammu Tawi, Munger, Gaya and other cities.

Railway transportation was introduced in India within 30 years of its maiden run in England.

The East Indian Railway Company, formed on 1 June 1845, completed its survey for a railway line from Kolkata, then called Calcutta, to Delhi via Mirzapur in 1846. The company initially became defunct on refusal of government guarantee, which was given in 1849. Thereafter, an agreement was signed between East Indian Railway Company and the East India Company, for the construction and operation of an "experimental" line between Kolkata and Rajmahal, which would later be extended to Delhi via Mirzapur. Construction began in 1851.

On 15 August 1854, the first passenger train in the eastern section was operated from Howrah (near Calcutta) to Hooghly, 39 kilometres (24 mi) away. On 1 February 1855 the first train ran from Hooghly to Raniganj, 195 kilometres (121 mi) from Howrah. The priority accorded to the Raniganj section was because of the assurance of coal transportation.

The Khana Junction-Rajmahal section was complete in October 1859, crossing Ajay River on the way. The first train ran from Howrah to Rajmahal via Khana on 4 July 1860. The loop from Khana Junction to Kiul via Jamalpur, including the Monghyr branch, was ready in February 1862.

From Rajmahal, construction progressed rapidly, moving westward along the banks of the Ganges, reaching Bhagalpur in 1861, Munger in February 1862, and opposite Varanasi (across the Ganges) in December 1862 and then on to Naini on the bank of the Yamuna. The work included EIR's first tunnel at Jamalpur and first major bridge across the Son River at Arrah.

During 1863–64, work progressed rapidly on the Allahabad–Kanpur–Tundla and Aligarh–Ghaziabad sections. The Yamuna bridge near Delhi was completed in 1864 and EIR established the Delhi terminus. The Yamuna bridge at Allahabad opened on 15 August 1865 and in 1866 Kolkata and Delhi were directly linked. The 1 Dn/ 2 Up Mail started running.

With the completion of the 406 kilometres (252 mi)-long line connecting Raniganj with Kiul in 1871, a "shorter main line" was in position. Initially, it was called the chord line. However, as it attracted more traffic it was designated the main line and the original line became the Sahibganj loop.

After approximately 150 years of operation, Kiul Jn. to Barharwa Jn. section including Bhagalpur Jn. of Sahibganj loop line is converted in double line on 14-05-2019 except Ratanpur–Jamalpur section.

Bhagalpur is also the originating station for many Superfast and Express trains.

ON 15 January 2024, the Agartala Rajdhani Express weakly started running through Bhagalpur.

== Facilities ==
The major facilities available include free wi-fi across the entire Bhagalpur Junction platforms, waiting rooms, retiring room, a computerised reservation facility, reservation counter, vehicle parking etc. The vehicles are allowed to enter the station premises. There are refreshment rooms vegetarian and non-vegetarian, tea stall, book stall, post and telegraphic office and Government Railway police (G.R.P.) office. Automatic ticket vending machines have been installed to reduce the queue on the station for train tickets.

=== Platforms ===
There are six standard on-ground platforms at the station and seven railway lines passing through it. All platforms are well interlinked with three footover bridges and has elevators installed. The station has entry and exit at platform number 1 and platform number 6.

=== Escalators ===
Bhagalpur Junction is among the selected railway stations of India where automated Escalators are installed.

== Developments ==
In the Rail Budget 2008, Bhagalpur was announced to be converted to as Railway Division and yet to be implemented by ER. The new rail lines from Sultanganj to Deoghar were announced and the construction is yet to start.

Approximately after 157 years, the Kiul-Bhagalpur rail section has a second tunnel become operational on 29-01-2022. (Only Ratanpur to Jamalpur section of the Kiul Jn. to Barharwa section was operating on singletrack as Work on the construction of the second tunnel near Jamalpur was in progress. Work for doubling the 111-kilometer-long (69 mi) stretch started in 2010 (announced in 1996).)

Work on the new 130-kilometer (81 mi) long Rampurhat–Dumka–Mander Hill broad-gauge line completed and Kavi Guru Express Bhagalpur Jn to Howrah is running on this route.

The construction of Pirpainti–Godda–Hansdiha new rail line is under progress and Hansdiha–Padeyahat (हंसडीहा-ैड़ेयाहाट) section is opened on 17 September 2019. Godda–Hansdiha Section of Pirpainti–Godda–Hansdiha new rail line is opened on 4 April 2021.

The Electrification of Jamalpur Locomotive Workshop (established on 8 February 1862 as the first full-fledged railway workshop facility in India) is started. Maintenance and repairing of Electric Locomotive are also started.

There is a plan to build the first railway terminal of Bhagalpur Junction near Baunsi Bridge (Chaudharidih village). All six platforms of the station will be made to accommodate of 24 coaches. Shunting yard will be constructed till Bhikhanpur Gumti number 2. as well as preparations are also underway to build an underpass. Speed of tracks will be increased from 110 kilometers per hour to 130 KMPH in Jamalpur-Bhagalpur-Sahibganj railway section. the speed of Bhagalpur-Dumka railway section will be increased to 110 kilometers per hour.

== Electrification updates ==
The Howrah–Gaya–Delhi route, popularly known as the Grand Chord, was the shortest railway route in India to be fully electrified with AC traction. The electrification was completed on 5 August 1976.

The electrification of the Bonidanga Link Cabin–Kiul Junction rail section via Barharwa–Sahibganj–Bhagalpur was completed in June 2020 ndertaken as part of the Pt. Deen Dayal Upadhyaya Package in Bihar..

After nearly 155 years of railway operations on the Kiul Junction–Bhagalpur Junction section of the Sahibganj Loop, the Vikramshila Express became the first train to be hauled by an electric locomotive on 2 June 2019. Train No. 12368 Down Anand Vihar Terminal (ANVT)–Bhagalpur (BGP) Vikramshila Express arrived at Bhagalpur powered by an electric locomotive. The return service, Train No. 12367 Up Bhagalpur–Anand Vihar Terminal Vikramshila Express, departed from Bhagalpur with electric traction on 3 June 2019 and freight services using electric locomotives commenced on 3 July 2020. Subsequently, on 7 July 2020, Train No. 05956/05955 Delhi–Dibrugarh–Delhi Special (Brahmaputra Mail) became the first passenger train to operate with electric traction on the Bhagalpur–Sahibganj section up to New Jalpaiguri (NJP) via Bhagalpur.

The Bhagalpur–Barahat–Banka section of the Dumka–Bhagalpur railway line was fully electrified on 29 March 2021. On the same day, the Banka–Rajendranagar Intercity Express began operating with electric traction from Banka, while the Godda–New Delhi Humsafar Special (Train No. 02307) was flagged off as the first electric-hauled train from Godda. The remaining Barahat–Dumka–Rampurhat section was fully electrified on 6 October 2021, completing the electrification of the entire route.

== Jamalpur Workshop ==
Jamalpur Workshop on Kiul Jn.–Bhagalpur Jn. section, the first full-fledged railway workshop facility in India, was opened on 8 February 1862, at a time when the Howrah–Delhi main line, passing through Jamalpur was under construction. It undertook repairs of wagons, coaches, cranes and tower cars, and locomotives, as well as manufacture of some tower cars, break-down cranes and various kinds of heavy-duty lifting jacks. They also produced their own locomotives, starting with the CA 764 Lady Curzon in 1899. It has also produced ticket printers and other ticket machines (slitting, counting, and chopping). With fairly extensive workshop facilities, it was a fairly self-contained.[7]

== Branch lines ==
- Bhagalpur–Rampurhat via Dumka
- Bhagalpur–Jasidih via Banka
- Bhagalpur–Godda via Hansdiha

== Trains ==
=== Trains originating from Bhagalpur ===
- Bhagalpur–Lokmanya Tilak Terminus Superfast Express
- Bhagalpur-Anand Vihar Terminal Garib Rath Express
- Surat-Bhagalpur Express
- Bhagalpur Ranchi Vananchal Express
- Bhagalpur Jaynagar Express
- Bhagalpur–Muzaffarpur Jan Sewa Express
- Bhagalpur-Danapur Intercity Express
- Bhagalpur-Jammu Tawi Amarnath Express
- Ajmer-Bhagalpur Weekly Humsafar Express
- Bhagalpur Gandhidham Express
- Anga Express
- Vikramshila Express
- Gandhidham–Bhagalpur Special
- Bhagalpur Ahmedabad Amrit Bharat Express
- Bhagalpur Katihar Special Express

While There are lot of Passenger and Express trains that has stop at Bhagalpur.

== See also ==
- Bhagalpur
- Sultanganj railway station
- Rampurhat Junction Railway Station
- Jamalpur Junction railway station
- Banka Junction railway station
- Dumka railway station
- Mandar Hill railway station
