= Dharhara railway station =

Railway station in Bihar, India

Dharhara

General information
- Location: Jamalpur-Kajra Road, Dharhara, Munger district, Bihar; India
- Coordinates: 25°15′28″N 86°24′42″E
- Elevation: 54 m (177 ft)
- System: Passenger train station
- Owner: Indian Railways
- Operator: Eastern Railway zone
- Line: Sahibganj loop line
- Platforms: 2
- Tracks: 2

Construction
- Structure type: Standard (on ground station)

Other information
- Status: Active
- Station code: DRH
- Zone(s): Eastern Railway zone
- Division(s): Malda

History
- Former names: East Indian Railway Company

Services
Preceding station	Indian Railways	Following station
Dasharathpur towards Khana	Eastern Railway zone Sahibganj loop	Masudan towards Kiul Junction
Location

Dharhara railway station is a railway station on Sahibganj loop line under the Malda railway division of Eastern Railway zone. It is situated beside Jamalpur-Kajra Road at Dharhara in Munger district in the Indian state of Bihar.
