= Bhagalpur–Lokmanya Tilak Terminus Superfast Express =

Train in India

Bhagalpur - Lokmanya Tilak Terminus Superfast Express
Overview
- Service type: Superfast Express
- Current operator: Eastern Railway zone

Route
- Termini: Bhagalpur Junction (BGP); Lokmanya Tilak Terminus (LTT)
- Stops: 37
- Distance travelled: 1,910 km (1,190 mi)
- Average journey time: 35 hours
- Service frequency: Two days (Note: Runs three days in a week for every direction.)
- Train number: 12335/12236

On-board services
- Classes: AC 2 tier, AC 3 tier, Sleeper Class, General Unreserved
- Seating arrangements: No
- Sleeping arrangements: Yes
- Catering facilities: No
- Entertainment facilities: No
- Baggage facilities: Below the seats

Technical
- Rolling stock: 2
- Track gauge: 1,676 mm (5 ft 6 in)
- Operating speed: 55 km/h (34 mph)

Bhagalpur - Lokmanya Tilak Terminus Superfast Express is a Superfast Express train of the Indian Railways connecting Lokmanya Tilak Terminus Kurla in Maharashtra and Bhagalpur Junction of Bihar. It is currently being operated with 12335/12236 train numbers on a Bi-Weekly basis.

== Service ==
The 12335/Bhagalpur - Mumbai LTT SF Express has an average speed of 55 km/h and covers 1910 km in 35 hrs. 12336/Mumbai LTT - Bhagalpur SF Express has an average speed of 56 km/h and 1910 km in 34 hrs 55 mins.

== Route and halts ==
The important halts of the train are:

- Bhagalpur Junction
- Jamalpur Junction
- Kiul Junction
- Bakhtiyarpur Junction
- Patna Sahib
- Patna Junction
- Danapur
- Ara Junction
- Dumraon
- Buxar
- Dildarnagar Junction
- Mughalsarai Junction
- Mirzapur
- Allahabad Chheoki Junction
- Satna Junction
- Katni Junction
- Jabalpur Junction
- Itarsi Junction
- Khandwa Junction
- Bhusaval Junction
- Manmad Junction
- Nasik Road
- Igatpuri
- Kasara
- Kalyan Junction
- Thane
- Lokmanya Tilak Terminus

== Coach composite ==
The train has standard LHB rakes with max speed of 110 kmph and average speed of 55kmph. The train consists of 22 coaches :

- 2 AC II Tier
- 5 AC III Tier
- 9 Sleeper Coaches
- 3 General
- 1 Pantry Car
- 1 Second-class Luggage/parcel van
- 1 EOG cum Luggage Van

== Traction ==
Both trains are hauled by an Howrah Loco Shed based WAP-4 Electric locomotive from Bhagalpur to Lokmanya Tilak Terminus and from Satna To Katni it is hauled by a Katni Loco Shed[WDM-3A]

== See also ==
- Lokmanya Tilak Terminus
- Bhagalpur Junction railway station
- Lokmanya Tilak Terminus Darbhanga Pawan Express
- Lokmanya Tilak Terminus Muzaffarpur Pawan Express

== Schedule ==
12335 - Starts from Bhagalpur every Tuesday,Friday at Morning 9:00 AM IST and reach Lokmanya Tilak Terminus on 2nd Day at Evening 8:00 PM

12336 - Starts for Lokmanya Tilak Terminus on every Sunday,Tuesday at Morning 8:05 AM IST and reach Bhagalpur next day at 6:30 PM IST.
