= Sir M. Visvesvaraya Terminal =

Railway station in Bangalore, India

Sir M. Visvesvaraya Terminal, Bengaluru Sar Eṁ. Viśvēśvarayya Nildāṇa, Beṅgaḷūru
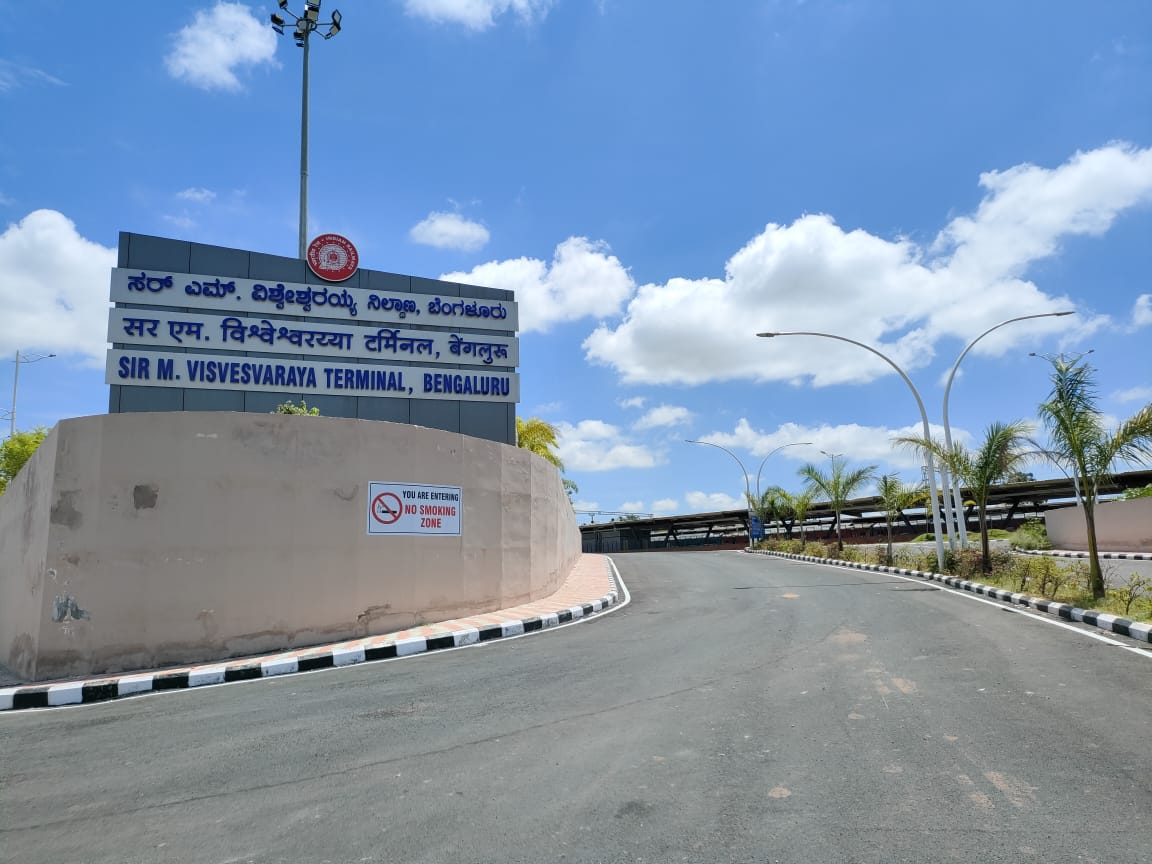
- SMVT railway station

General information
- Other names: SMVT Bengaluru
- Location: Baiyyapanahalli, Bengaluru, Karnataka; India
- Coordinates: 12.99962°N 77.64107°E
- System: Railway station
- Owner: Indian Railways
- Operator: Indian Railways
- Line: Yesvantpur-Baiyappanahalli branch line
- Platforms: 7
- Train operators: Indian Railways
- Connections: BMTC; Purple Line (Baiyappanahalli)

Construction
- Structure type: At–ground
- Parking: Available
- Accessible: Disabled access

Other information
- Status: Operational
- Station code: SMVB
- Zone(s): South Western Railway zone
- Division(s): Bangalore

History
- Opened: 6 June 2022; 4 years ago
Location
- Location within Bengaluru

SMVT Bengaluru, officially Sir M. Visvesvaraya Terminal, Bengaluru (station code: SMVB) is a railway station in Bengaluru, India. Located at Baiyyapanahalli, it is operated by the South Western Railway Zone of the Indian Railways. It is named after M. Visvesvaraya and was inaugurated on 6 June 2022.

== Planning and development ==
The railway station is located at Baiyyapanahalli, and is the third intercity railway terminal in Bengaluru after Bengaluru City and Yesvantpur railway stations. It was built at a cost of ₹3.14 billion (US$34 million). Originally scheduled to be completed by 2018, construction finished in 2021 and it was officially inaugurated on 6 June 2022.

== Infrastructure ==
The railway station has a 4,200 m^{2} (45,000 sq ft) terminal building which is fully air-conditioned. It is the first such air-conditioned railway terminal in India. The station has seven rail platforms, each 600 m (2,000 ft)-long and 15 m (49 ft)-wide. Apart from the platforms, there are eight stabling lines and three pit lines.

== Services ==
The station is operated by the South Western Railway Zone of the Indian Railways, and is served by 50+ services.

== Connectivity ==
The railway station is connected to nearby neighborhoods in the city by the Bangalore Metropolitan Transport Corporation.

== Accidents ==
On 8 October 2022, a 31-year-old woman slipped and fell between platform no. 1 and the adjoining track while trying to board the Kamakhya–SMVT Bengaluru AC Superfast Express. She was rescued by the Government Railway Police, and later succumbed to her injuries while being transported to the hospital.
