= Udyan Abha Toofan Express =

Train in India

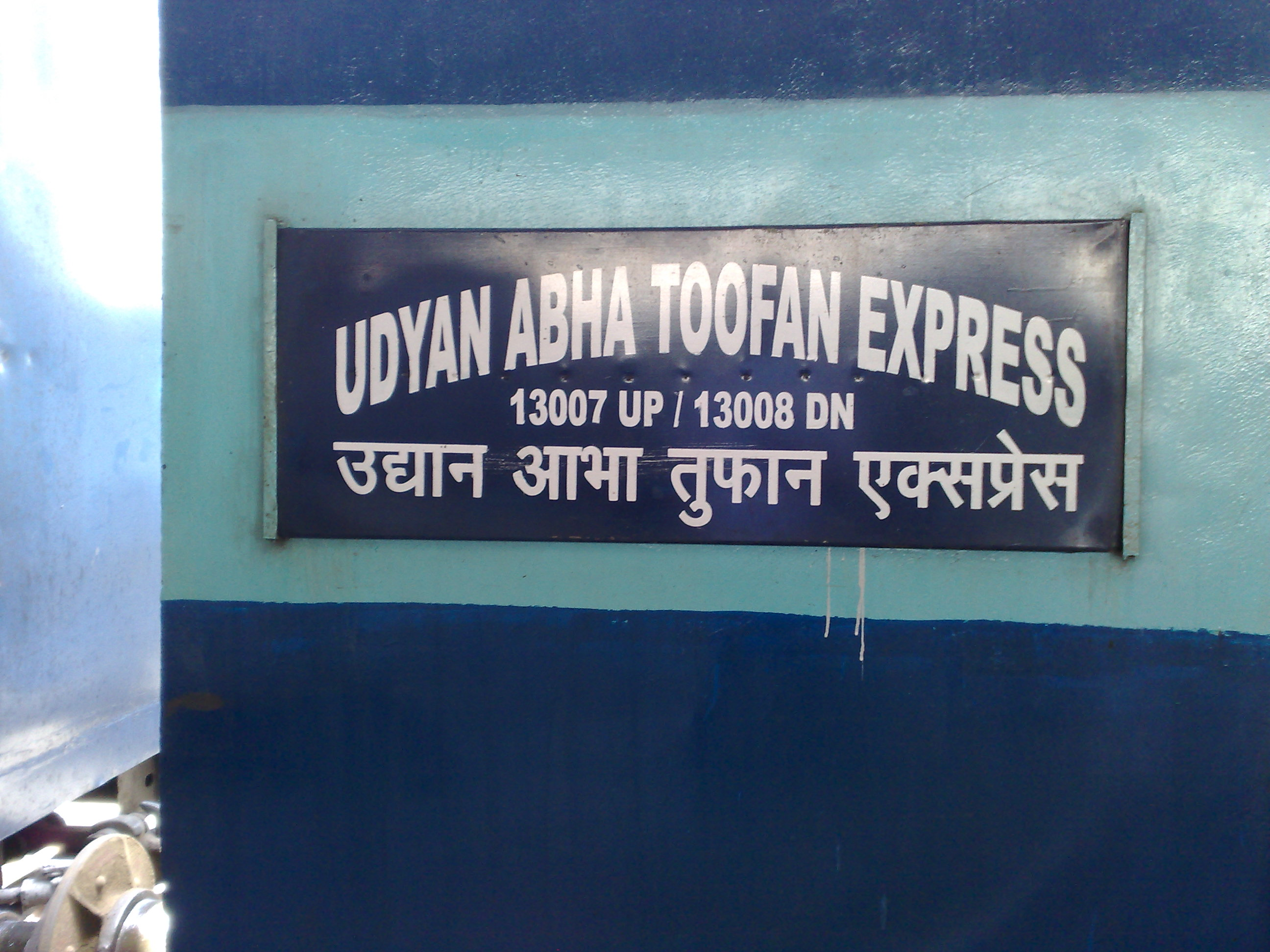

Overview
- Service type: Express
- Status: Discontinued
- First service: 1 June 1930; 95 years ago
- Last service: 19 May 2020; 5 years ago (Permanently cancelled)
- Current operator: Eastern Railways

Route
- Termini: Howrah (HWH); Shri Ganganagar (SGNR)
- Stops: 110 as 13007; 107 as 13008
- Distance travelled: 1,978 km (1,229 mi)
- Average journey time: 45 hours 25 minutes as 13007, 46 hours 20 minutes as 13008
- Service frequency: Daily
- Train number: 13007 / 13008

On-board services
- Classes: AC 3 tier, AC 2 tier, Sleeper class, General Unreserved
- Seating arrangements: Yes
- Sleeping arrangements: Yes
- Catering facilities: Available but no pantry car attached
- Baggage facilities: Available

Technical
- Rolling stock: ICF coach
- Track gauge: 1,676 mm (5 ft 6 in)
- Operating speed: 110 km/h (68 mph) maximum, 44 km/h (27 mph) average including halts

The 13007 / 13008 Udyan Abha Toofan Express was an Express train belonging to Indian Railways – Eastern Railway zone that used to run between Howrah and Sri Ganganagar in India.

It operated as train number 13007 from Howrah to Sri Ganganagar and as train number 13008 in the reverse direction, serving the 8 states of West Bengal, Jharkhand, Bihar, Uttar Pradesh, Haryana, Delhi, Punjab and Rajasthan. Eastern Railway cancelled its operations permanently from 19 May 2020 with 16 other pairs of trains such as the Sealdah-Rampurhat Intercity Express, Barddhaman-Rampurhat Express, Sealdah-Anand Vihar Terminal Express, Sealdah-Varanasi Express, Howrah-Anand Vihar Yuva Express, Howrah-New Jalpaiguri AC Express, Sealdah-Sitamarhi Express, Kolkata-Patna Express, Howrah-Amritsar Express, and 7 other passenger trains.

== Timetable and Coaches ==
13007 U ABHA TOOFAN Express operated from Howrah to Shri Ganganagar passing through 110 station as per the timetable (last) below:

S.No. CODE	Station Name Platform	Train Timings Scheduled	
1	HOWRAH JN Platform: 10	A D	Source (Day 1) 09:35 (Day 1)
2	BANDEL JN Platform: 1	A D	10:32 (Day 1) 10:37 (Day 1)
3	BARDDHAMAN JN Platform: 2	A D	11:35 (Day 1) 11:40 (Day 1)
4	PANAGARH Platform: 1	A D	12:15 (Day 1) 12:16 (Day 1)
5	DURGAPUR Platform: 3	A D	12:33 (Day 1) 12:35 (Day 1)
6	ANDAL JN Platform: 2	A D	12:48 (Day 1) 12:50 (Day 1)
7	RANIGANJ Platform: 2	A D	12:57 (Day 1) 12:58 (Day 1)
8	ASANSOL JN Platform: 4	A D	13:30 (Day 1) 13:35 (Day 1)
9	SITARAMPUR Platform: 3	A D	13:48 (Day 1) 13:50 (Day 1)
10	CHITTARANJAN Platform: 3	A D	14:06 (Day 1) 14:08 (Day 1)
11	JAMTARA Platform: 1	A D	14:21 (Day 1) 14:22 (Day 1)
12	VIDYASAGAR Platform: 1	A D	14:39 (Day 1) 14:40 (Day 1)
13	MADHUPUR JN Platform: 2	A D	15:02 (Day 1) 15:12 (Day 1)
14	JASIDIH JN Platform: 2	A D	15:37 (Day 1) 15:42 (Day 1)
15	SIMULTALA Platform:	A D	16:01 (Day 1) 16:02 (Day 1)
16	JHAJHA Platform: 3	A D	16:40 (Day 1) 16:45 (Day 1)
17	GIDHAUR Platform: 1	A D	16:55 (Day 1) 16:56 (Day 1)
18	JAMUI Platform: 1	A D	17:07 (Day 1) 17:09 (Day 1)
19	MANANPUR Platform: 1	A D	17:22 (Day 1) 17:24 (Day 1)
20	BANSIPUR Platform:	A D	17:32 (Day 1) 17:34 (Day 1)
21	KIUL JN Platform: 3	A D	17:46 (Day 1) 17:50 (Day 1)
22	LUCKEESARAI JN Platform: 2	A D	17:54 (Day 1) 17:56 (Day 1)
23	MANKATHA Platform: 2	A D	18:02 (Day 1) 18:04 (Day 1)
24	DUMRI HALT Platform: 2	A D	18:13 (Day 1) 18:14 (Day 1)
25	BARHIYA Platform: 2	A D	18:19 (Day 1) 18:21 (Day 1)
26	HATHIDAH JN Platform: 2	A D	18:32 (Day 1) 18:33 (Day 1)
27	MOKAMEH JN Platform: 3	A D	18:40 (Day 1) 18:44 (Day 1)
28	MOR Platform:	A D	18:50 (Day 1) 18:52 (Day 1)
29	PUNARAKH Platform:	A D	19:00 (Day 1) 19:02 (Day 1)
30	BARH Platform: 2	A D	19:11 (Day 1) 19:13 (Day 1)
31	ATHMAL GOLA Platform: 2	A D	19:22 (Day 1) 19:23 (Day 1)
32	BAKHTIYARPUR JN Platform: 2	A D	19:30 (Day 1) 19:32 (Day 1)
33	KHUSROPUR Platform:	A D	19:43 (Day 1) 19:45 (Day 1)
34	FATUHA JN Platform: 3	A D	19:58 (Day 1) 20:00 (Day 1)
35	PATNA SAHEB Platform: 2	A D	20:19 (Day 1) 20:21 (Day 1)
36	GULZARBAGH Platform: 3	A D	20:28 (Day 1) 20:30 (Day 1)
37	PATNA JN Platform: 4	A D	21:15 (Day 1) 21:25 (Day 1)
38	DANAPUR Platform: 3	A D	21:39 (Day 1) 21:41 (Day 1)
39	NEORA Platform: 1	A D	21:45 (Day 1) 21:47 (Day 1)
40	SADISOPUR Platform: 1	A D	21:55 (Day 1) 21:56 (Day 1)
41	BIHTA Platform: 2	A D	21:59 (Day 1) 22:01 (Day 1)
42	KOELWAR Platform: 1	A D	22:10 (Day 1) 22:11 (Day 1)
43	KULHARIA Platform: 2	A D	22:15 (Day 1) 22:17 (Day 1)
44	ARA Platform: 2	A D	22:28 (Day 1) 22:33 (Day 1)
45	BIHIYA Platform: 2	A D	22:48 (Day 1) 22:50 (Day 1)
46	BANAHI Platform: 1	A D	22:56 (Day 1) 22:58 (Day 1)
47	RAGHUNATHPUR Platform: 2	A D	23:19 (Day 1) 23:21 (Day 1)
48	DUMRAON Platform: 2	A D	23:34 (Day 1) 23:36 (Day 1)
49	BUXAR Platform: 2	A D	23:52 (Day 1) 23:57 (Day 1)
50	DILDARNAGAR JN Platform: 3	A D	00:23 (Day 2) 00:25 (Day 2)
51	ZAMANIA Platform: 2	A D	00:35 (Day 2) 00:37 (Day 2)
52	PT DEEN DAYAL UPADHYAY JN Platform: 6	A D	02:25 (Day 2) 02:40 (Day 2)
53	CHUNAR Platform: 2	A D	03:16 (Day 2) 03:18 (Day 2)
54	MIRZAPUR Platform: 3	A D	03:43 (Day 2) 03:48 (Day 2)
55	VINDHYACHAL Platform: 3	A D	03:58 (Day 2) 04:00 (Day 2)
56	PRAYAGRAJ JN Platform: 3	A D	05:10 (Day 2) 05:20 (Day 2)
57	BHARWARI Platform: 2	A D	05:50 (Day 2) 05:51 (Day 2)
58	SIRATHU Platform: 2	A D	06:06 (Day 2) 06:08 (Day 2)
59	KHAGA Platform: 3	A D	06:24 (Day 2) 06:26 (Day 2)
60	FATEHPUR Platform: 3	A D	06:52 (Day 2) 06:54 (Day 2)
61	BINDKI ROAD Platform: 3	A D	07:27 (Day 2) 07:28 (Day 2)
62	KANPUR CENTRAL Platform: 1	A D	08:30 (Day 2) 08:40 (Day 2)
63	GOVINDPURI Platform: 1	A D	08:50 (Day 2) 08:51 (Day 2)
64	PANKI DHAM Platform: 2	A D	09:00 (Day 2) 09:01 (Day 2)
65	RURA Platform: 3	A D	09:25 (Day 2) 09:27 (Day 2)
66	JHINJHAK Platform: 3	A D	09:43 (Day 2) 09:45 (Day 2)
67	PHAPHUND Platform: 3	A D	10:01 (Day 2) 10:03 (Day 2)
68	ACHALDA Platform: 3	A D	10:18 (Day 2) 10:20 (Day 2)
69	BHARTHANA Platform: 3	A D	10:37 (Day 2) 10:39 (Day 2)
70	ETAWAH Platform: 1	A D	10:56 (Day 2) 11:01 (Day 2)
71	JASWANTNAGAR Platform: 3	A D	11:15 (Day 2) 11:17 (Day 2)
72	BHADAN Platform: 2	A D	11:33 (Day 2) 11:35 (Day 2)
73	SHIKOHABAD JN Platform: 3	A D	11:51 (Day 2) 11:56 (Day 2)
74	FIROZABAD Platform: 3	A D	12:12 (Day 2) 12:17 (Day 2)
75	TUNDLA JN Platform: 2	A D	13:05 (Day 2) 13:10 (Day 2)
76	AGRA FORT Platform: 2	A D	14:15 (Day 2) 14:20 (Day 2)
77	IDGAH AGRA JN Platform: 1	A D	14:35 (Day 2) 14:37 (Day 2)
78	AGRA CANTT Platform: 4	A D	14:55 (Day 2) 15:20 (Day 2)
79	RAJA KI MANDI Platform: 1	A D	15:30 (Day 2) 15:32 (Day 2)
80	MATHURA JN Platform: 2	A D	16:25 (Day 2) 16:30 (Day 2)
81	CHATA Platform: 2	A D	16:58 (Day 2) 16:59 (Day 2)
82	KOSI KALAN Platform: 1	A D	17:10 (Day 2) 17:12 (Day 2)
83	PALWAL Platform: 4	A D	18:03 (Day 2) 18:05 (Day 2)
84	ASAOTI Platform: 3	A D	18:16 (Day 2) 18:17 (Day 2)
85	BALLABGARH Platform: 3	A D	18:26 (Day 2) 18:27 (Day 2)
86	FARIDABAD NW TN Platform: 2	A D	18:33 (Day 2) 18:34 (Day 2)
87	FARIDABAD Platform: 2	A D	18:39 (Day 2) 18:41 (Day 2)
88	TUGLAKABAD Platform: 2	A D	18:51 (Day 2) 18:53 (Day 2)
89	OKHLA Platform: 2	A D	19:00 (Day 2) 19:02 (Day 2)
90	H NIZAMUDDIN Platform: 3	A D	19:12 (Day 2) 19:14 (Day 2)
91	TILAK BRIDGE Platform: 1	A D	19:20 (Day 2) 19:21 (Day 2)
92	NEW DELHI Platform: 1	A D	19:40 (Day 2) 20:00 (Day 2)
93	DELHI KISHANGNJ Platform: 1	A D	20:13 (Day 2) 20:15 (Day 2)
94	SHAKURBASTI Platform: 2	A D	20:34 (Day 2) 20:36 (Day 2)
95	NANGLOI Platform: 1	A D	20:45 (Day 2) 20:47 (Day 2)
96	BAHADURGARH Platform: 2	A D	21:00 (Day 2) 21:02 (Day 2)
97	SAMPLA Platform: 1	A D	21:14 (Day 2) 21:16 (Day 2)
98	ROHTAK JN Platform: 2	A D	21:43 (Day 2) 21:48 (Day 2)
99	JULANA Platform: 2	A D	22:08 (Day 2) 22:10 (Day 2)
100	JIND JN Platform: 1	A D	22:34 (Day 2) 22:39 (Day 2)
101	UCHANA Platform: 1	A D	22:53 (Day 2) 22:55 (Day 2)
102	NARWANA JN Platform: 3	A D	23:08 (Day 2) 23:10 (Day 2)
103	TOHANA Platform: 1	A D	23:28 (Day 2) 23:30 (Day 2)
104	JAKHAL JN Platform: 1	A D	23:45 (Day 2) 23:50 (Day 2)
105	BUDHLADA Platform: 2	A D	00:09 (Day 3) 00:11 (Day 3)
106	MANSA Platform: 1	A D	00:25 (Day 3) 00:27 (Day 3)
107	MAUR Platform: 1	A D	00:43 (Day 3) 00:44 (Day 3)
108	BHATINDA JN Platform: 2	A D	02:10 (Day 3) 04:15 (Day 3)
109	GIDDARBAHA Platform: 1	A D	04:37 (Day 3) 04:39 (Day 3)
110	MALOUT Platform: 1	A D	04:55 (Day 3) 04:57 (Day 3)
111	ABOHAR Platform: 1	A D	05:36 (Day 3) 05:38 (Day 3)
112	SHRI GANGANAGAR Platform: 3	A D	07:10 (Day 3) Destination (Day 3)

13008 U ABHA TOOFAN Express operated from Shri Ganganagar to Howrah passing through 105 station as per the timetable (last) below:

S.No. CODE	Station Name Platform	Train Timings Scheduled	
1	SHRI GANGANAGAR Platform:	A D	Source (Day 1) 21:00 (Day 1)
2	ABOHAR Platform:	A D	21:54 (Day 1) 21:56 (Day 1)
3	MALOUT Platform:	A D	22:20 (Day 1) 22:22 (Day 1)
4	GIDDARBAHA Platform:	A D	22:38 (Day 1) 22:40 (Day 1)
5	BHATINDA JN Platform:	A D	23:20 (Day 1) 00:10 (Day 2)
6	MAUR Platform:	A D	00:34 (Day 2) 00:36 (Day 2)
7	MANSA Platform:	A D	00:51 (Day 2) 00:53 (Day 2)
8	BUDHLADA Platform:	A D	01:07 (Day 2) 01:09 (Day 2)
9	JAKHAL JN Platform:	A D	01:37 (Day 2) 01:39 (Day 2)
10	TOHANA Platform:	A D	01:52 (Day 2) 01:54 (Day 2)
11	NARWANA JN Platform:	A D	02:13 (Day 2) 02:15 (Day 2)
12	UCHANA Platform:	A D	02:28 (Day 2) 02:30 (Day 2)
13	JIND JN Platform:	A D	02:52 (Day 2) 02:57 (Day 2)
14	JULANA Platform:	A D	03:13 (Day 2) 03:15 (Day 2)
15	ROHTAK JN Platform:	A D	03:50 (Day 2) 03:55 (Day 2)
16	SAMPLA Platform:	A D	04:10 (Day 2) 04:12 (Day 2)
17	BAHADURGARH Platform:	A D	04:26 (Day 2) 04:28 (Day 2)
18	NANGLOI Platform:	A D	04:39 (Day 2) 04:41 (Day 2)
19	SHAKURBASTI Platform:	A D	05:21 (Day 2) 05:23 (Day 2)
20	DELHI KISHANGNJ Platform:	A D	05:35 (Day 2) 05:37 (Day 2)
21	NEW DELHI Platform:	A D	06:20 (Day 2) 07:10 (Day 2)
22	TUGLAKABAD Platform:	A D	07:38 (Day 2) 07:40 (Day 2)
23	FARIDABAD Platform:	A D	07:51 (Day 2) 07:53 (Day 2)
24	BALLABGARH Platform:	A D	08:04 (Day 2) 08:06 (Day 2)
25	PALWAL Platform:	A D	08:54 (Day 2) 08:56 (Day 2)
26	KOSI KALAN Platform:	A D	09:28 (Day 2) 09:30 (Day 2)
27	CHATA Platform:	A D	09:40 (Day 2) 09:42 (Day 2)
28	MATHURA JN Platform:	A D	10:20 (Day 2) 10:25 (Day 2)
29	RAJA KI MANDI Platform:	A D	11:10 (Day 2) 11:12 (Day 2)
30	AGRA CANTT Platform:	A D	11:50 (Day 2) 12:05 (Day 2)
31	IDGAH AGRA JN Platform:	A D	12:30 (Day 2) 12:32 (Day 2)
32	AGRA FORT Platform:	A D	12:47 (Day 2) 12:52 (Day 2)
33	TUNDLA JN Platform:	A D	14:00 (Day 2) 14:05 (Day 2)
34	FIROZABAD Platform:	A D	14:25 (Day 2) 14:30 (Day 2)
35	SHIKOHABAD JN Platform:	A D	14:47 (Day 2) 14:52 (Day 2)
36	BHADAN Platform:	A D	15:08 (Day 2) 15:10 (Day 2)
37	JASWANTNAGAR Platform:	A D	15:26 (Day 2) 15:28 (Day 2)
38	ETAWAH Platform:	A D	15:42 (Day 2) 15:47 (Day 2)
39	BHARTHANA Platform:	A D	16:04 (Day 2) 16:06 (Day 2)
40	ACHALDA Platform:	A D	16:29 (Day 2) 16:31 (Day 2)
41	PHAPHUND Platform:	A D	16:53 (Day 2) 16:55 (Day 2)
42	JHINJHAK Platform:	A D	17:11 (Day 2) 17:13 (Day 2)
43	RURA Platform:	A D	17:29 (Day 2) 17:31 (Day 2)
44	PANKI DHAM Platform:	A D	18:05 (Day 2) 18:06 (Day 2)
45	GOVINDPURI Platform:	A D	18:18 (Day 2) 18:20 (Day 2)
46	KANPUR CENTRAL Platform:	A D	18:45 (Day 2) 18:55 (Day 2)
47	BINDKI ROAD Platform:	A D	19:35 (Day 2) 19:37 (Day 2)
48	FATEHPUR Platform:	A D	20:00 (Day 2) 20:02 (Day 2)
49	KHAGA Platform:	A D	20:45 (Day 2) 20:47 (Day 2)
50	SIRATHU Platform:	A D	21:08 (Day 2) 21:10 (Day 2)
51	BHARWARI Platform:	A D	21:28 (Day 2) 21:30 (Day 2)
52	PRAYAGRAJ JN Platform:	A D	22:10 (Day 2) 22:15 (Day 2)
53	VINDHYACHAL Platform:	A D	23:13 (Day 2) 23:15 (Day 2)
54	MIRZAPUR Platform:	A D	23:30 (Day 2) 23:35 (Day 2)
55	CHUNAR Platform:	A D	00:02 (Day 3) 00:04 (Day 3)
56	PT DEEN DAYAL UPADHYAY JN Platform:	A D	01:03 (Day 3) 01:13 (Day 3)
57	ZAMANIA Platform:	A D	01:56 (Day 3) 01:58 (Day 3)
58	DILDARNAGAR JN Platform:	A D	02:11 (Day 3) 02:13 (Day 3)
59	BUXAR Platform:	A D	02:50 (Day 3) 02:55 (Day 3)
60	DUMRAON Platform:	A D	03:06 (Day 3) 03:08 (Day 3)
61	RAGHUNATHPUR Platform:	A D	03:28 (Day 3) 03:30 (Day 3)
62	BANAHI Platform:	A D	03:38 (Day 3) 03:40 (Day 3)
63	BIHIYA Platform:	A D	04:03 (Day 3) 04:05 (Day 3)
64	ARA Platform:	A D	04:50 (Day 3) 04:54 (Day 3)
65	KULHARIA Platform:	A D	05:03 (Day 3) 05:05 (Day 3)
66	KOELWAR Platform:	A D	05:10 (Day 3) 05:12 (Day 3)
67	BIHTA Platform:	A D	05:21 (Day 3) 05:23 (Day 3)
68	SADISOPUR Platform:	A D	05:29 (Day 3) 05:30 (Day 3)
69	NEORA Platform:	A D	05:37 (Day 3) 05:39 (Day 3)
70	DANAPUR Platform:	A D	06:14 (Day 3) 06:16 (Day 3)
71	PATNA JN Platform:	A D	06:30 (Day 3) 06:40 (Day 3)
72	GULZARBAGH Platform:	A D	06:53 (Day 3) 06:55 (Day 3)
73	PATNA SAHEB Platform:	A D	07:02 (Day 3) 07:04 (Day 3)
74	FATUHA JN Platform:	A D	07:15 (Day 3) 07:17 (Day 3)
75	KHUSROPUR Platform:	A D	07:26 (Day 3) 07:28 (Day 3)
76	BAKHTIYARPUR JN Platform:	A D	07:45 (Day 3) 07:47 (Day 3)
77	ATHMAL GOLA Platform:	A D	07:53 (Day 3) 07:55 (Day 3)
78	BARH Platform:	A D	08:03 (Day 3) 08:05 (Day 3)
79	PUNARAKH Platform:	A D	08:14 (Day 3) 08:16 (Day 3)
80	MOR Platform:	A D	08:25 (Day 3) 08:27 (Day 3)
81	MOKAMEH JN Platform:	A D	08:36 (Day 3) 08:40 (Day 3)
82	HATHIDAH JN Platform:	A D	08:47 (Day 3) 08:49 (Day 3)
83	BARHIYA Platform:	A D	09:03 (Day 3) 09:05 (Day 3)
84	DUMRI HALT Platform:	A D	09:12 (Day 3) 09:13 (Day 3)
85	MANKATHA Platform:	A D	09:21 (Day 3) 09:23 (Day 3)
86	LUCKEESARAI JN Platform:	A D	09:56 (Day 3) 09:58 (Day 3)
87	KIUL JN Platform:	A D	10:14 (Day 3) 10:18 (Day 3)
88	BANSIPUR Platform:	A D	10:26 (Day 3) 10:27 (Day 3)
89	MANANPUR Platform:	A D	10:34 (Day 3) 10:36 (Day 3)
90	JAMUI Platform:	A D	10:48 (Day 3) 10:50 (Day 3)
91	GIDHAUR Platform:	A D	11:03 (Day 3) 11:05 (Day 3)
92	JHAJHA Platform:	A D	11:52 (Day 3) 11:57 (Day 3)
93	SIMULTALA Platform:	A D	12:12 (Day 3) 12:14 (Day 3)
94	JASIDIH JN Platform:	A D	12:35 (Day 3) 12:40 (Day 3)
95	MADHUPUR JN Platform:	A D	13:05 (Day 3) 13:09 (Day 3)
96	VIDYASAGAR Platform:	A D	13:27 (Day 3) 13:29 (Day 3)
97	JAMTARA Platform:	A D	13:46 (Day 3) 13:48 (Day 3)
98	CHITTARANJAN Platform:	A D	14:04 (Day 3) 14:06 (Day 3)
99	SITARAMPUR Platform:	A D	14:23 (Day 3) 14:25 (Day 3)
100	ASANSOL JN Platform:	A D	14:54 (Day 3) 15:04 (Day 3)
101	RANIGANJ Platform:	A D	15:19 (Day 3) 15:21 (Day 3)
102	ANDAL JN Platform:	A D	15:33 (Day 3) 15:35 (Day 3)
103	DURGAPUR Platform:	A D	15:49 (Day 3) 15:51 (Day 3)
104	PANAGARH Platform:	A D	16:01 (Day 3) 16:03 (Day 3)
105	BARDDHAMAN JN Platform:	A D	17:01 (Day 3) 17:06 (Day 3)
106	BANDEL JN Platform:	A D	18:25 (Day 3) 18:30 (Day 3)
107	HOWRAH JN Platform:	A D	19:30 (Day 3) Destination (Day 3)

13008 also split at Bhatinda Junction towards Kalka passing through 11 stations listed below:

108	BHATINDA JN Platform:	A D	23:20 (Day 1) 23:50 (Day 1)
109	RAMPURA PHUL Platform:	A D	00:28 (Day 2) 00:30 (Day 2)
110	BARNALA Platform:	A D	01:02 (Day 2) 01:04 (Day 2)
111	DHURI JN Platform:	A D	01:40 (Day 2) 01:45 (Day 2)
112	NABHA Platform:	A D	02:06 (Day 2) 02:08 (Day 2)
113	PATIALA Platform:	A D	02:28 (Day 2) 02:30 (Day 2)
114	RAJPURA JN Platform:	A D	03:15 (Day 2) 03:18 (Day 2)
115	AMBALA CITY Platform:	A D	03:32 (Day 2) 03:36 (Day 2)
116	AMBALA CANT JN Platform:	A D	03:55 (Day 2) 04:20 (Day 2)
117	DAPPAR Platform:	A D	04:40 (Day 2) 04:42 (Day 2)
118	CHANDIGARH Platform:	A D	05:05 (Day 2) 05:13 (Day 2)
119	CHANDI MANDIR Platform:	A D	05:21 (Day 2) 05:23 (Day 2)
120	KALKA Platform:	A D	05:50 (Day 2) Destination (Day 2)

13007 had two reserved classes: Sleeper (S1 to S6) and 3AC (B1 to B2). It also had five unreserved (general) coaches, two general cum luggage coaches and one handicapped coach. In 13008, one Sleeper coach and one 3AC coach were split at Bhatinda Junction towards Kalka while an additional Sleeper coach (S8) was added.

== Service ==
The 13007 Howrah–Sri Ganganagar Udyan Abha Toofan Express covered the distance of 1978 kilometres in 45 hours 25 mins (43.55 km/h) and in 46 hours 20 mins as 13008 Sri Ganganagar–Howrah Udyan Abha Toofan Express (42.69 km/h).

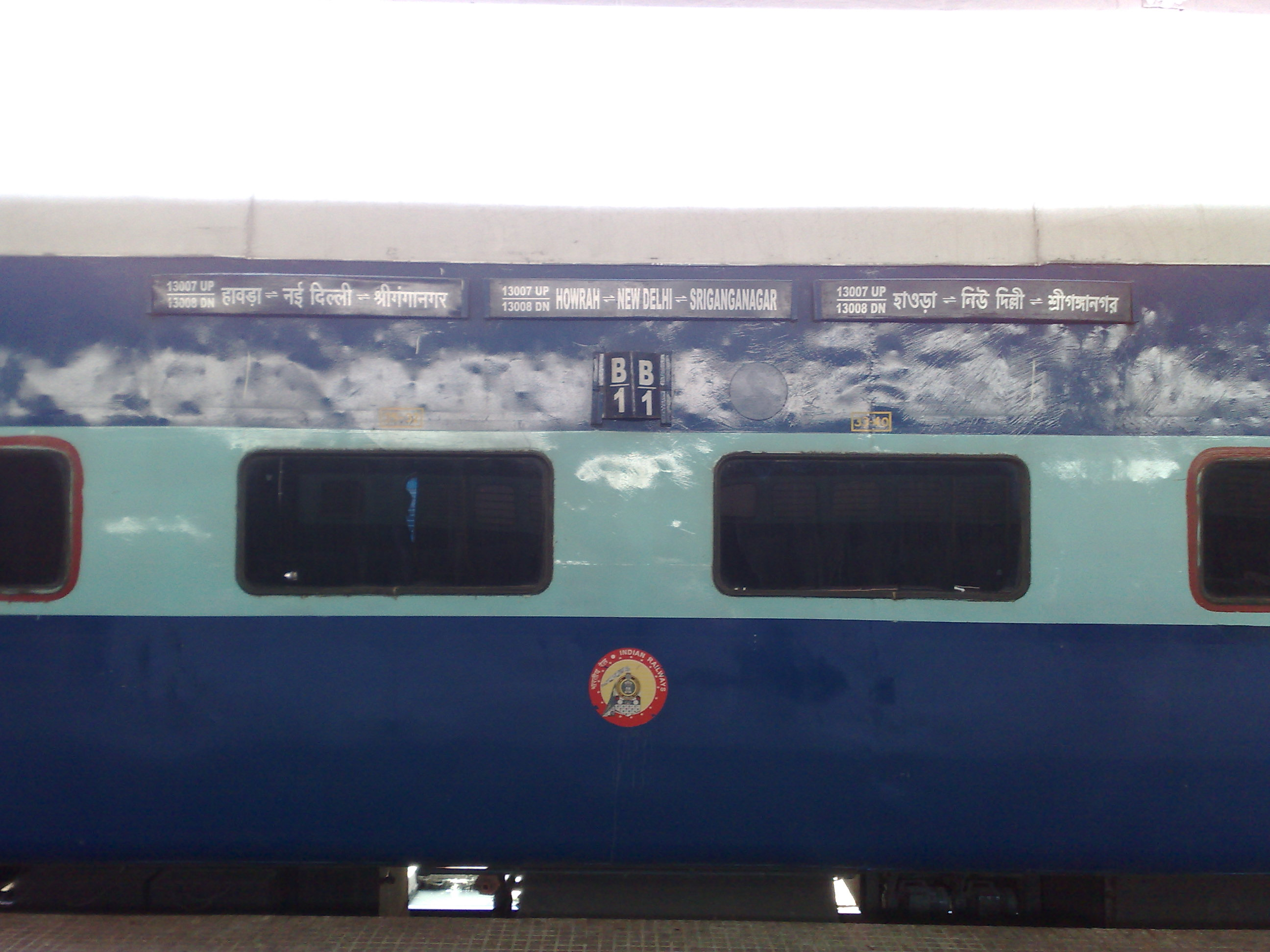
13007 Udyan Abha Toofan Express – AC 3 tier coach

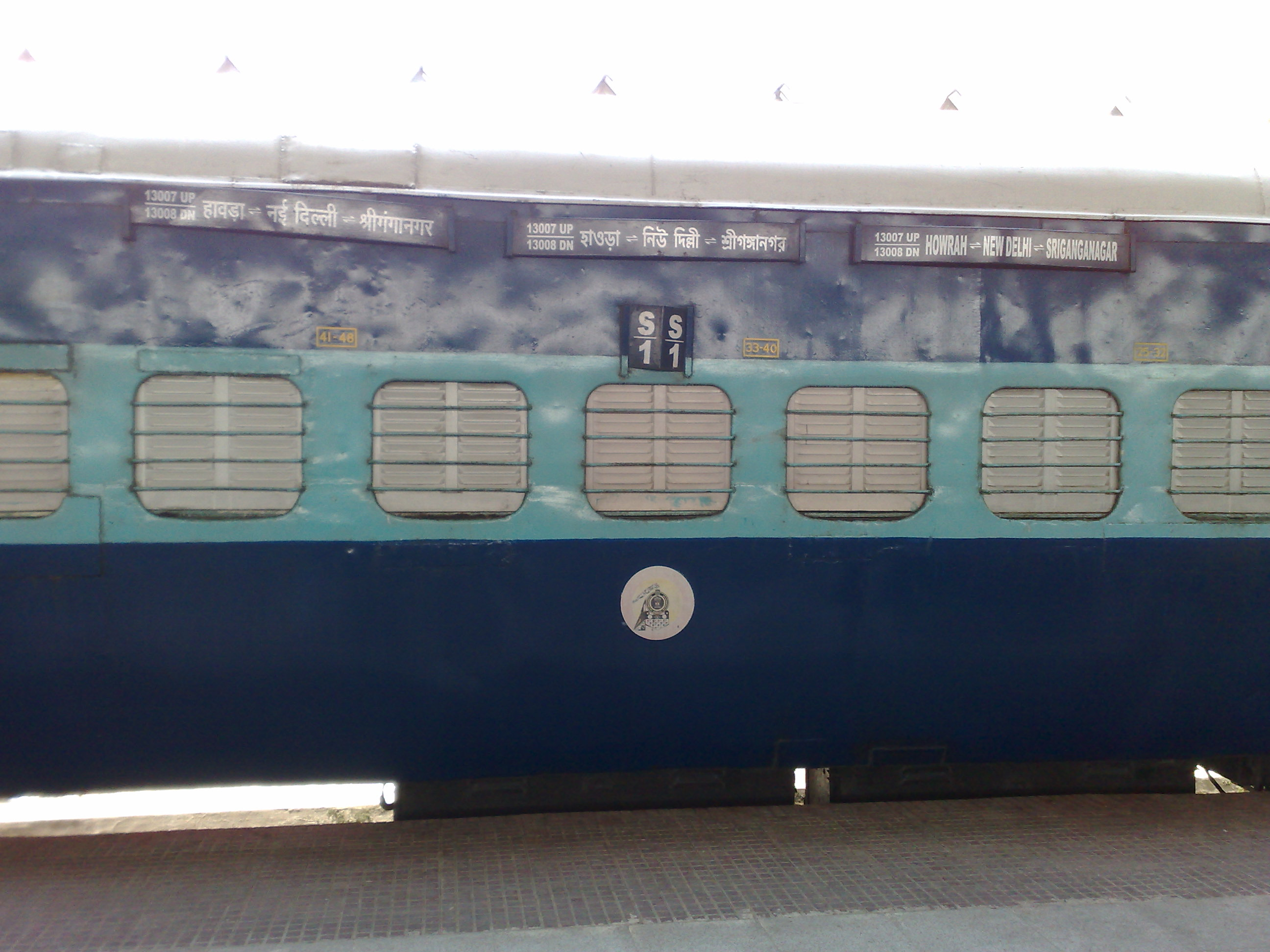
13007 Udyan Abha Toofan Express – Sleeper class coach

== Routing ==
The 13007 / 13008 Howrah –Sri Ganganagar Udyan Abha Toofan Express ran from Howrah Junction via Bardhaman Junction, Asansol Junction, Kiul Junction, Mokama Junction, Barh, Patna Junction, Mughalsarai Junction, Allahabad Junction, Kanpur Central, Mathura Junction, New Delhi, Rohtak Junction, Bhatinda Junction to Sri Ganganagar.

It reversed direction of travel at Agra Cantonment.

== Traction ==
As the route is partly electrified, a Howrah-based WAP-4 hauled the train from Howrah Junction up to Bathinda Junction handing over to a Ludhiana-based WDM-3A which powered the train for the remainder of the journey.

== Timings ==
- 13007 Howrah–Sri Ganganagar Udyan Abha Toofan Express left Howrah Junction on a daily basis and reached Sri Ganganagar on the 3rd day.
- 13008 Sri Ganganagar–Howrah Udyan Abha Toofan Express left Sri Ganganagar on a daily basis and reached Howrah Junction on the 3rd day.
