= Sahid Express =

Train in India

Overview
- Service type: Superfast
- First service: 4 July 2010; 15 years ago
- Current operator: Eastern Railway

Route
- Termini: Howrah (HWH); Rampurhat (RPH)
- Stops: 7
- Distance travelled: 207 km (129 mi)
- Average journey time: 3 hours 35 minutes
- Service frequency: Daily (Note: Runs seven days in a week for every direction.)
- Train number: 12347 / 12348

On-board services
- Classes: AC Chair Car, Non AC Chair Car, 3rd AC Sleeper, Non AC Sleeper, General Unreserved
- Seating arrangements: Yes
- Sleeping arrangements: Yes
- Auto-rack arrangements: Overhead racks
- Catering facilities: E-catering only
- Observation facilities: Large windows
- Baggage facilities: Yes
- Other facilities: Below the seats

Technical
- Rolling stock: LHB coach
- Track gauge: 1,676 mm (5 ft 6 in)
- Operating speed: 58 km/h (36 mph) average including halts.

The 12347 / 12348 Sahid Express is a superfast express train of the Indian Railways connecting Howrah Junction in West Bengal and Rampurhat Junction of West Bengal. It is currently being operated with train numbers 12347/12348 on a daily basis.

== Service ==
The 12347/Howrah - Rampurhat Sahid SF Express has an average speed of 56 km/h and covers 207 km in 3 hrs 40 mins. 12348/Rampurhat - Howrah Sahid SF Express has an average speed of 56 km/h and covers 207 km in 3 hrs 40 mins.

== Coach composite ==
The train has standard LHB rakes with max speed of 130 kmph. The train consists of 14 coaches :

Coach Composition of Rampurhat – Howrah Sahid Superfast Express
Position	Coach	Description
Loco	Loco	Locomotive Engine
1	🚉 SLR	Seating-cum-Luggage Rake
2	💺 B1	3rd AC Sleeper (3A)
3	💺 C1	AC Chair Car
4	🪑 S1	Non AC Sleeper (SL)
5	🪑 D1	Second Class Reserved Seating
6	🪑 D2	Second Class Reserved Seating
7	🪑 D3	Second Class Reserved Seating
8	🟩 GEN	General Unreserved
9	🟩 GEN	General Unreserved
10	🟩 GEN	General Unreserved
11	🟩 GEN	General Unreserved
12	🟩 GEN	General Unreserved
13	♿ LDS	Luggage-cum-Disabled-friendly Coach
EOG	⚡ EOG	End-On Generator

== Schedule ==
The schedule of this 12347/12348 Howrah–Rampurhat Sahid SF Express is given below:-

HWH - RPH - HWH Sahid SF Express
12347		Stations	12348	
Arrival	Departure	Stations	Arrival	Departure
SRC	12:15	Howrah Junction	20:15	DSTN
12:36	12:37	Kamarkundu	19:10	19:12
13:17	13:19	Barddhaman Junction	18:20	18:22
13:59	14:01	Guskara	17:41	17:42
14:16	14:18	Bolpur Shantiniketan	17:24	17:26
14:26	14:28	Prantik	17:18	17:19
14:43	14:44	Ahmedpur Junction	17:04	17:05
14:57	14:59	Sainthia Junction	16:52	16:53
15:50	DSTN	Rampurhat Junction	SRC	16:40

== Traction ==
Both trains are hauled by a Howrah Loco Shed based WAP 4 / WAP-5 / WAP 7 electric locomotive from Howrah to Rampurhat and vice versa.

== Rake sharing ==
The train shares its rake with 13017/18 Ganadevata Express and 13015/16 Howrah–Jamalpur Kavi Guru Express.

== See also ==
- Howrah Junction railway station
- Rampurhat Junction railway station
- Maa Tara Express
- Viswabharati Fast Passenger
- Tarapith
