= PNE =

PNE can be used to abbreviate the subatomic particles, Proton, Neutron and Electron, when referring to them en masse.

PNE as an acronym could refer to:

- Pacific National Exhibition, an exhibition in Vancouver, British Columbia
- Preston North End F.C., an English football club based in Preston, Lancashire
- Peaceful nuclear explosion, a nuclear explosive set off for peaceful reasons, such as Operation Plowshare
- Penge East railway station, London, National Rail station code PNE
- The Indian Railways code for Prantik railway station, West Bengal, India
- Pudendal nerve entrapment
- PNe, planetary nebula
- Parokya ni Edgar, a Filipino rock band
- The IATA airport code of Northeast Philadelphia Airport
- North-East Project, Italian political party based in Veneto
- Paroxysmal non-epileptic event (PNE), of which Psychogenic non-epileptic seizure (PNES) is common
