= Howrah–Azimganj Kavi Guru Express =

Overview
- Service type: Express, Kavi Guru Express
- First service: 1 May 2011
- Current operator: Eastern Railways

Route
- Termini: Howrah (HWH); Azimganj Junction (AZ)
- Stops: 9
- Distance travelled: 278 km (173 mi)
- Average journey time: 5 hours 40 minutes as 13027, 6 hours 05 minutes as 13028.
- Service frequency: Daily
- Train number: 13027 / 13028

On-board services
- Classes: Chair Car, Sleeper class, General Unreserved
- Seating arrangements: Yes
- Sleeping arrangements: Yes
- Catering facilities: E-catering

Technical
- Rolling stock: ICF coach
- Track gauge: 1,676 mm (5 ft 6 in)
- Electrification: No
- Operating speed: 110 km/h (68 mph) maximum, 49 km/h (30 mph) average including halts

The 13027 / 13028 Howrah–Azimganj Kavi Guru Express is an Express train of the Kavi Guru series belonging to Indian Railways – Eastern Railway zone that runs between Howrah Junction and Azimganj Junction via Rampurhat Junction in India.

It operates as train number 13027 from Howrah Junction to Azimganj Junction and as train number 13028 in the reverse direction, serving the state of West Bengal.

== Coaches ==
The 13027 / 13028 Howrah–Azimganj Junction Kavi Guru Express has 3 Second Class Chair Car, 7 Sleeper class, 7 General Unreserved and 2 SLR (Seating cum Luggage Rake) coaches. It does not carry a pantry car.

As is customary with most train services in India, coach composition may be amended at the discretion of Indian Railways depending on demand.

== Service ==
The 13027 Howrah–Azimganj Junction Kavi Guru Express covers the distance of 278 km (173 mi) in 5 hours 40 mins (49.06 km/h) and in 6 hours 05 mins as 13028 Azimganj Junction–Howrah Kavi Guru Express (45.70 km/h).

As the average speed of the train is below 55 km/h (34 mph), as per Indian Railways rules, its fare does not include a Superfast surcharge.

== Routeing ==
The 13027 / 13028 Howrah–Azimganj Junction Kavi Guru Express runs from Howrah via Bandel Junction, Barddhaman Junction, Bolpur Shantiniketan, Sainthia Junction, Rampurhat Junction, Nalhati Junction, Morgram, Sagardighi to Azimganj Junction.

== Traction ==
Earlier was WDM-3D run this train end to end. As sections of the route are electrified, a Howrah-based WAP-7 / WAP-5 / WAP-4 locomotive hauls the train for its entire journey.

== Operation ==
- 13027 Howrah–Azimganj Junction Kavi Guru Express runs from Howrah Junction on a daily basis reaching Azimganj Junction the next day.
- 13028 Azimganj Junction–Howrah Kavi Guru Express runs from Azimganj Junction on a daily basis reaching Howrah Junction on the same day.

== Controversy ==
The train was among the trains investigated by the Comptroller and Auditor General of India based on their introduction .

== See also ==
- Kavi Guru Express
- 13015/16 Howrah–Bhagalpur Kavi Guru Express
- 12949/50 Porbandar–Santragachi Kavi Guru Express
- 19709/10 Udaipur City–Kamakhya Kavi Guru Express
