= Howrah–Jamalpur Kavi Guru Express =

Howrah – Jamalpur Kavi Guru Express
Overview
- Service type: Express, Kavi Guru Express
- First service: 13 November 2011
- Current operator: Eastern Railways

Route
- Termini: Howrah (HWH); Jamalpur Junction (JMP)
- Stops: 18
- Distance travelled: 451 km (280 mi)
- Average journey time: 11 hours 15 minutes
- Service frequency: Daily
- Train number: 13015 / 13016

On-board services
- Classes: AC Chair Car, AC 3 Tier, Chair Car, General Unreserved
- Seating arrangements: Yes
- Sleeping arrangements: No
- Catering facilities: E-catering
- Observation facilities: Large windows
- Baggage facilities: Available
- Other facilities: Below the seats

Technical
- Rolling stock: LHB coach
- Track gauge: 1,676 mm (5 ft 6 in)
- Electrification: No
- Operating speed: 110 km/h (68 mph) maximum, 51.57 km/h (32 mph) average including halts

The 13015 / 13016 Howrah – Jamalpur Kavi Guru Express is an Express train of the Kavi Guru series belonging to Indian Railways – Eastern Railway zone that runs between Howrah Junction and Jamalpur Junction via Rampurhat Junction and Bhagalpur Junction in India. It previously ran between Howrah and Bolpur(Shantiniketan), but later it was extended to run to Jamalpur.

It operates as train number 13015 from Howrah Junction to Jamalpur and as train number 13016 in the reverse direction, serving the state of West Bengal, Jharkhand and Bihar.

== Coaches ==
The 13015 / 13016 Howrah–Jamalpur Junction Kavi Guru Express had 1 AC chair car, 3 2nd seating chair car, 8 General Unreserved and 2 SLR (Seating cum Luggage Rake) coaches. It does not carry a pantry car. Now from 2024, This Kavi Guru Express has 1 3AC, 1 AC CC, 1 SL, 3 2nd Seating Chair Car, 5 General Unreserved Coach and 2 SLR Coaches.

As is customary with most train services in India, coach composition may be amended at the discretion of Indian Railways depending on demand.

== Service ==
The 13015 / 13016 Howrah–Jamalpur Junction Kavi Guru Express covers the distance of 398 km (247 mi) in 11 hours 15 mins (51.57 km/h) in both directions.

As the average speed of the train is below 55 km/h (34 mph), as per Indian Railways rules, its fare does include a Superfast surcharge.

== Routeing ==
The 13015 / 13016 Howrah–Jamalpur Junction Kavi Guru Express runs from Howrah via Bandel, Bardhaman, Bolpur Shantiniketan, Sainthia Junction, Rampurhat, Dumka, Bhagalpur to Jamalpur Junction.

== Traction ==
Earlier ago WDM-3D used to run this train. An Howrah-based WAP-4 locomotive hauls the train for its entire journey.

== Operation ==
- 13015 Howrah–Jamalpur Junction Kavi Guru Express runs from Howrah on a daily basis reaching Jamalpur Junction the same day.
- 13016 Jamalpur Junction–Howrah Kavi Guru Express runs from Jamalpur Junction on a daily basis reaching Howrah the same day.

== Rake sharing ==
It shares its rake with 13017/18 Ganadevata Express and 12347/48 Sahid Express.

== See also ==
- Kavi Guru Express
- 12949/50 Porbandar–Santragachi Kavi Guru Express
- 13027/28 Howrah–Azimganj Kavi Guru Express
- 19709/10 Udaipur City–Kamakhya Kavi Guru Express
