= Porbandar–Santragachi Kavi Guru Express =

Train In India

Overview
- Service type: Superfast , Kavi Guru Express
- First service: 18 November 2011; 14 years ago
- Current operator: Western Railways

Route
- Termini: Porbandar (PBR); Santragachi Junction (SRC)
- Stops: 35
- Distance travelled: 2,657 km (1,651 mi)
- Average journey time: 45 hrs 30 mins
- Service frequency: Weekly
- Train number: 12949 / 12950

On-board services
- Classes: AC 2 tier, AC 3 tier, Sleeper class, General Unreserved
- Seating arrangements: Yes
- Sleeping arrangements: Yes
- Catering facilities: On-board catering E-catering

Technical
- Rolling stock: ICF coach
- Track gauge: 1,676 mm (5 ft 6 in)
- Operating speed: 110 km/h (68 mph) maximum, 55.17 km/h (34 mph) average including halts
Route map
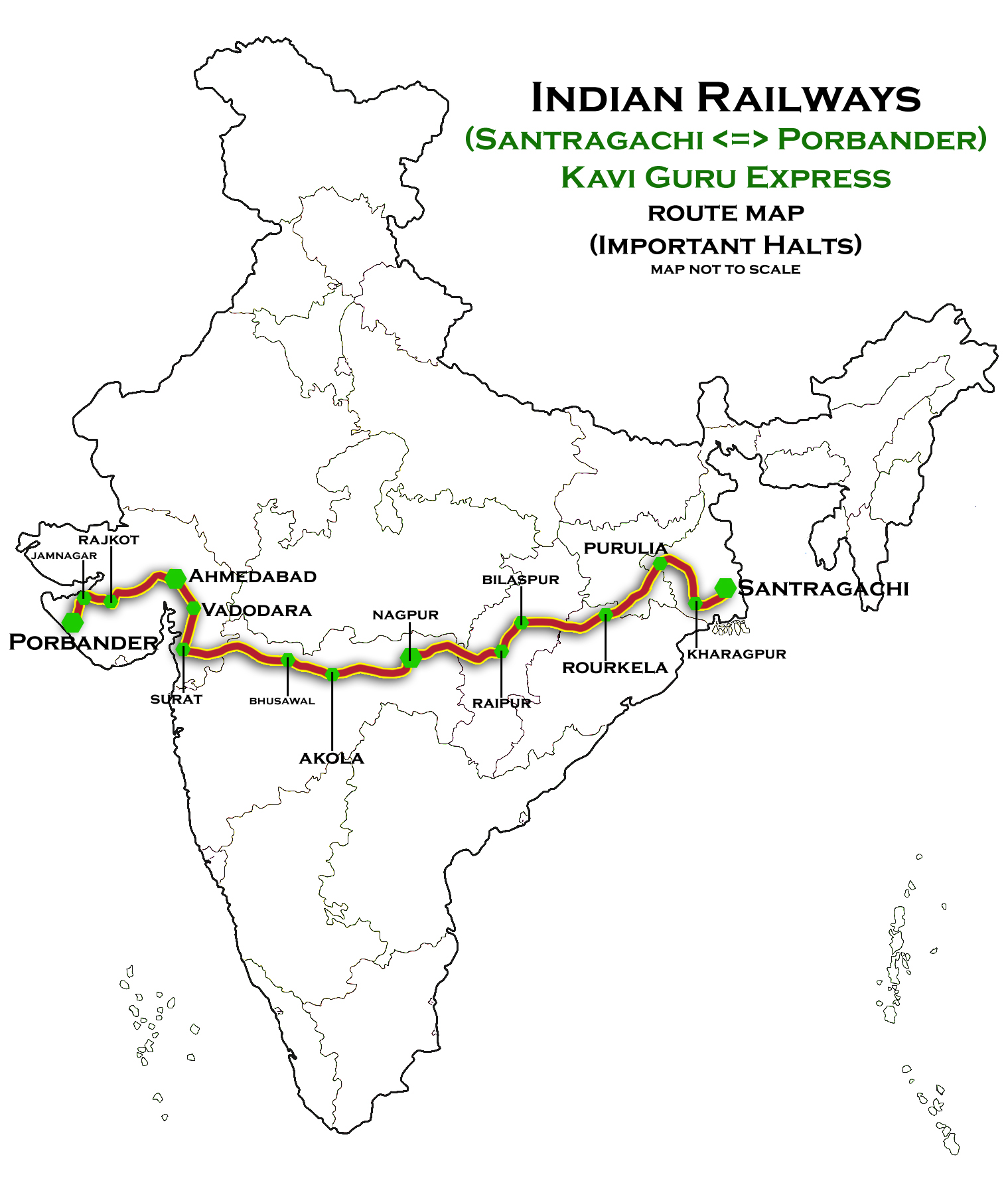

The 12949 / 12950 Porbandar–Santragachi Kavi Guru Express is a Superfast Express train of the Kavi Guru series belonging to Indian Railways – Western Railway zone that runs between Porbandar and Santragachi Junction in India.

It operates as train number 12949 from Porbandar to Santragachi Junction and as train number 12950 in the reverse direction, serving the states of Gujarat, Maharashtra, Chhattisgarh, Odisha, Jharkhand and West Bengal.

== Coaches ==
The 12949 / 12950 Porbandar–Santragachi Junction Kavi Guru Express has 1 AC 2 tier, 5 AC 3 tier, 10 Sleeper class, 1 Pantry Car, 4 General Unreserved and 2 SLR (Seating cum Luggage Rake) coaches. .

As is customary with most train services in India, coach composition may be amended at the discretion of Indian Railways depending on demand.

== Service ==
The 12949 Porbandar–Santragachi Junction Kavi Guru Express covers the distance of 2,657 km (1,651 mi) in 45 hours 10 mins (55.16 km/h) and 2,667 km (1,657 mi) in 46 hours 25 mins as 12950 Santragachi Junction–Porbandar Kavi Guru Express (55.18 km/h).

As the average speed of the train is above 55 km/h (34 mph), as per Indian Railways rules, its fare includes a Superfast surcharge.

== Routing ==
The 12949 / 12950 Porbandar–Santragachi Junction Kavi Guru Express runs from Porbandar via Rajkot Junction, Ahmedabad Junction, Vadodara Junction, Surat, Nandurbar, Bhusaval Junction, Badnera Junction, Wardha Junction ,Nagpur, Gondia Junction, Raipur Junction, Bilaspur Junction, Jharsuguda Junction, Rourkela Junction, Chakradharpur, Adra Junction, Kharagpur Junction to Santragachi Junction .

== Schedule ==
Train number	Station code	Departure station	Departure time	Departure day	Arrival station	Arrival time	Arrival day
12949	PBR	Porbandar	09:10 AM	Friday	Santragachi	06:20 AM	Sunday
12950	SRC	Santragachi	20:10 PM	Sunday	Porbandar	18:35 PM	Tuesday

== Traction ==
Earlier was meant to be WDP-4B. As the entire route is fully electrified, a Santragachi based WAP-4 locomotive hauls the train from Porbandar to Santragachi and vice-versa .

== See also ==
- Kavi Guru Express
- 13015/16 Howrah–Bhagalpur Kavi Guru Express
- 13027/28 Howrah–Azimganj Kavi Guru Express
- 19709/10 Udaipur City–Kamakhya Kavi Guru Express
