= Kavi Guru Express =

Series of Train in India

Overview
- Operator: Indian Railways
- Main Operational: India 2011
- Fleet: 4 runs on both LHB coach and ICF coach
- Dates of operation: 2011–

Other
- Website: www.indianrail.gov.in

The Kavi Guru Express series of trains were introduced by Indian Railways in 2011 for the 1st time together with the Rajya Rani Express. They were introduced by the then Railway Minister of India Ms. Mamata Banerjee in honour of Rabindranath Tagore. There were 4 trains proposed in the budget to operate as part of the series

== Service ==
- 12949/12950 Porbandar–Santragachi Kavi Guru Express
- 13015/13016 Howrah–Bhagalpur Kavi Guru Express
- 13027/13028 Howrah–Azimganj Kavi Guru Express
- 19709/19710 Udaipur City–Kamakhya Kavi Guru Express

However out of the four, only the 12949/12950 Porbandar–Santragachi Kavi Guru Express is classed as a Superfast Express.

== Traction ==
Earlier some Kavi Guru Express trains ran by diesel locomotives like WDM-3D, WDM-3A and most popular of all WDP-4D. After that all routes were fully electrified all electric locomotives run end to end like WAP-4, WAP-5 and best of all WAP-7.

== Incidents ==
The Udaipur City–Kamakhya Kavi Guru Express involved in 2013 Chapramari Forest train accident occurred on 13 November 2013 in the eastern area of the Chapramari Wildlife Sanctuary between Chalsa and Nagrakata in the Jalpaiguri district of West Bengal. The crash killed and injured at least 17 elephants and was described as the worst of its kind in recent history.

== See also ==
- Duronto Express
- Rajya Rani Express
- Vivek Express
- Yuva Express
