= Kopaihorod =

Rural locality in Vinnytsia Oblast, Ukraine

Kopaihorod Копайгород
- Rural settlement
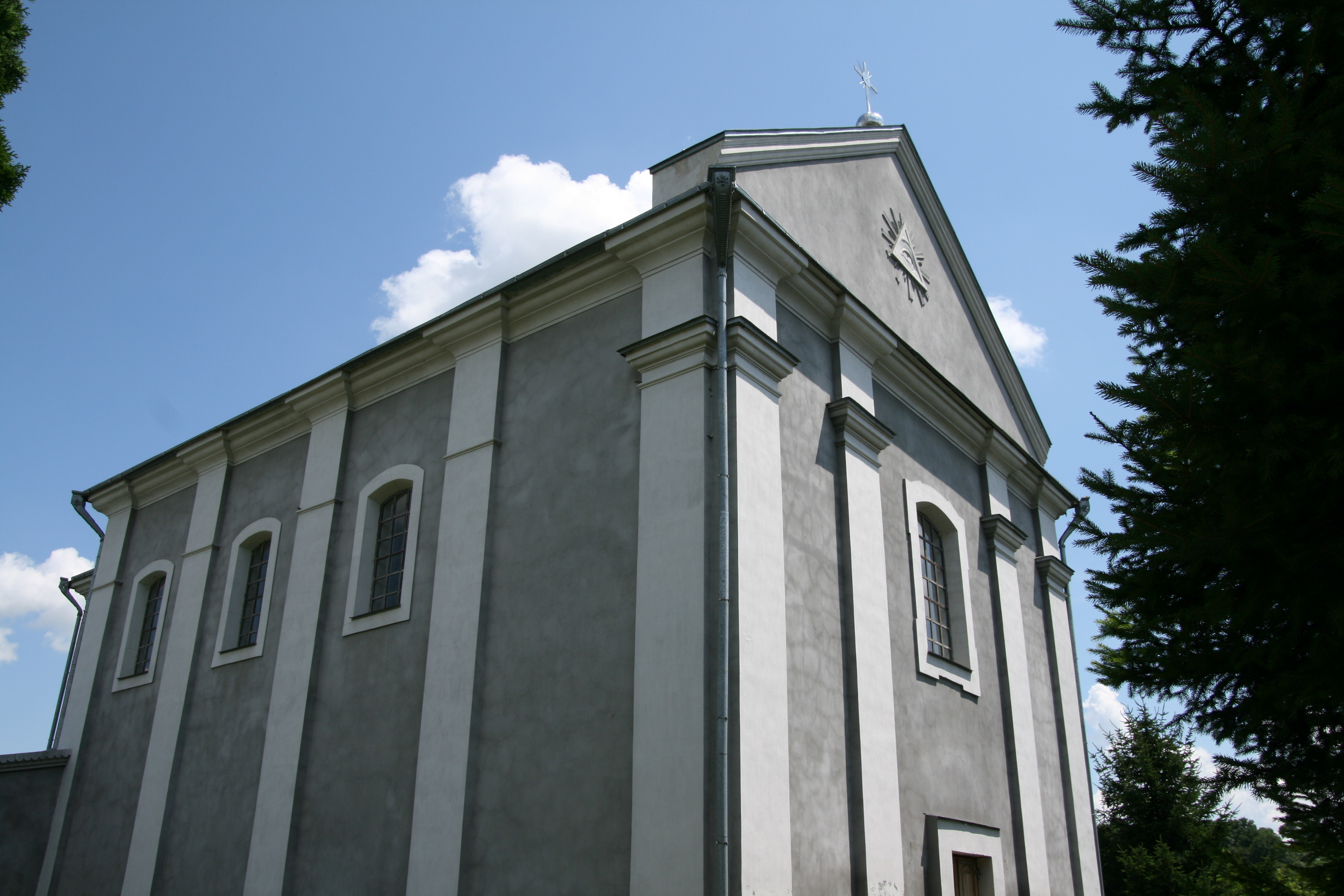
- Holy Sprit Church in Kopaihorod

- Location in Vinnytsia Oblast Location in Ukraine
- Country: Ukraine
- Oblast: Vinnytsia Oblast
- Raion: Zhmerynka Raion
- Founded: 1624
- Founder: Łukasz Kazimierz Maskowski

Population (2022)
  - Total: 1,206
- Time zone: UTC+2 (EET)
  - Summer (DST): UTC+3 (EEST)

Kopaihorod (Ukrainian: Копайгород) is a rural settlement in Zhmerynka Raion of Vinnytsia Oblast in Ukraine. It is located on the banks of the Nemiia, a left tributary of the Dniester. Kopaihorod hosts the administration of Kopaihorod settlement hromada, one of the hromadas of Ukraine. Population: 1,206 (2022 estimate) It is located in the historic region of Podolia.

== History ==
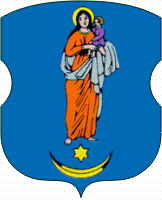
Historic coat of arms

In 1624, Polish King Sigismund III Vasa allowed Łukasz Kazimierz Maskowski to establish the town of Nowogród, and appointed him as wójt. Sigismund III granted Magdeburg rights, established annual fairs and two weekly markets, and exempted the townspeople from taxes for 20 years. Sigismund III also granted the coat of arms, depicting Mary with the infant Jesus and the Leliwa coat of arms of the founder of the town. Maskowski built the first church. By 1635, it was mentioned in official documents as Kopajgród. It was a royal town of Poland.

Until 18 July 2020, Kopaihorod belonged to Bar Raion. The raion was abolished in July 2020 as part of the administrative reform of Ukraine, which reduced the number of raions of Vinnytsia Oblast to six. The area of Bar Raion was merged into Zhmerynka Raion.

Until 26 January 2024, Kopaihorod was designated urban-type settlement. On this day, a new law entered into force which abolished this status, and Kopaihorod became a rural settlement.

== Economy ==
=== Transportation ===
The closest railway station, Kopai, is about 5 kilometres (3.1 mi) northwest of the settlement. It is on the railway line connecting Zhmerynka and Mohyliv-Podilskyi. There is infrequent passenger traffic.

The settlement has access to Highway M21 connecting Vinnytsia and Mohyliv-Podilskyi.
