= Barddhaman–Rampurhat Express =

Train in India

Overview
- Service type: Express
- First service: May 2, 2011; 15 years ago
- Last service: 11 May 2020 (Discontinued due to COVID)
- Current operator: Eastern Railway zone

Route
- Termini: Barddhaman Junction (BWN); Rampurhat Junction (RPH)
- Stops: 4
- Distance travelled: 112 km (70 mi)
- Average journey time: 2h 20m
- Service frequency: Thrice (Note: Runs three days in a week for every direction.)
- Train number: 13013/13014

On-board services
- Class: General Unreserved
- Seating arrangements: No
- Sleeping arrangements: Yes
- Catering facilities: On-board catering E-catering
- Observation facilities: ICF coach
- Entertainment facilities: No
- Baggage facilities: No
- Other facilities: Below the seats

Technical
- Rolling stock: 2
- Track gauge: 1,676 mm (5 ft 6 in)
- Operating speed: 48 km/h (30 mph), including halts

The Barddhaman–Rampurhat Express is an Express train belonging to Eastern Railway zone that runs between Barddhaman Junction and Rampurhat Junction in India. It was operated with 13013/13014 train numbers on thrice in a week basis. It is currently not operating and was cancelled. Before that, it ran from Bardhaman on Monday, Thursday & Saturday and from Rampurhat on Wednesday, Friday & Sunday.

== Service ==
The 13013/Barddhaman–Rampurhat Express has an average speed of 48 km/h and covers 112 km in 2h 20m. 13014/Rampurhat–Barddhaman Express has an average speed of 41 km/h and covers 112 km in 2h 45m.

== Route and halts ==
The important halts of the train are:

- Barddhaman Junction
- Bolpur Shantiniketan
- Prantik railway station
- Ahmadpur Junction
- Sainthia Junction
- Rampurhat Junction

== Coach composition ==
The train has standard LCF rakes with max speed of 110 kmph. The train consists of 10 coaches:

- 8 General
- 2 Generators cum Luggage/parcel van

== Traction ==
Both trains are hauled by an Asansol Loco Shed-based WAG-5P electric locomotive from Barddhaman to Rampurhat and vice versa.

== Rake sharing ==
Train shares its rake with 12373/12374 Sealdah–Rampurhat Intercity Express

== See also ==
- Rampurhat Junction railway station
- Barddhaman Junction railway station
- Sealdah–Rampurhat Intercity Express
