= Ganadevata Express =

Train in India

Overview
- Service type: Express
- Locale: West Bengal
- Current operator: Eastern Railway

Route
- Termini: Howrah (HWH); Azimganj (AZ)
- Stops: 13
- Distance travelled: 280 km (174 mi)
- Average journey time: 6 hours
- Service frequency: Daily
- Train number: 13017 / 13018

On-board services
- Classes: Chair Car, Second Class Seating, General Unreserved
- Seating arrangements: Yes
- Sleeping arrangements: No
- Catering facilities: E-catering only
- Observation facilities: Rake sharing with trains 13015/13016 (Howrah - Jamalpur Kavi Guru Express) and 12347/12348 (Sahid Express)
- Baggage facilities: No
- Other facilities: Below the seats

Technical
- Rolling stock: LHB coach
- Track gauge: 1,676 mm (5 ft 6 in)
- Operating speed: 47 km/h (29 mph) average including halts.
Route map
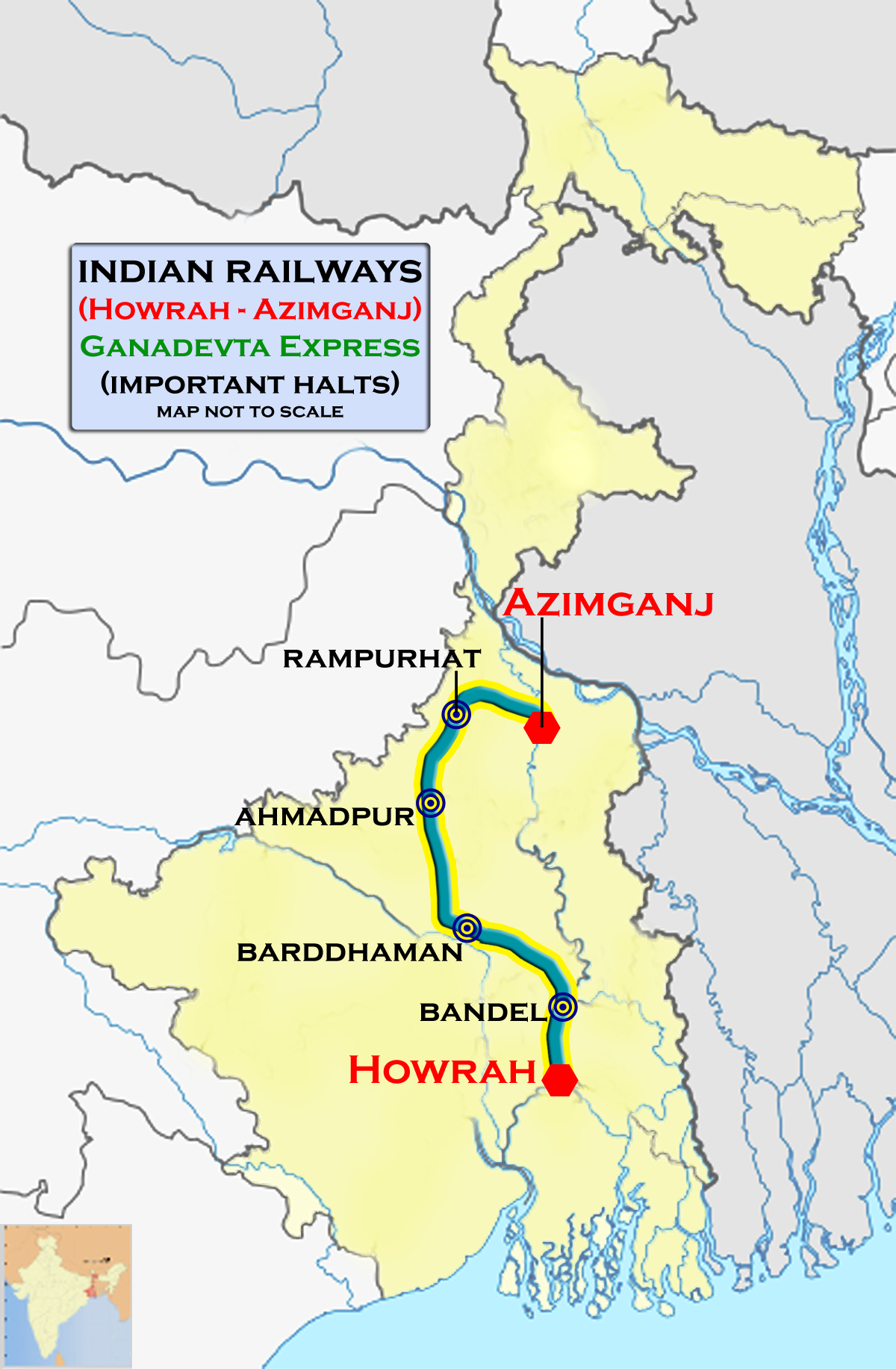

The 13017 / 13018 Ganadevata Express is an important Express-type day-running train operated by Indian Railways; it connects Kolkata with Azimganj, a town in Murshidabad district of West Bengal. It runs daily between Howrah and Azimganj via Rampurhat Junction.It previously ran between Howrah and Rampurhat, and was later extended to run to Azimganj.

The Ganadevata express is used extensively by pilgrims going to visit the Tarapith temple of Rampurhat. It covers 278 kilometers distance at an average speed of 47 kmph. Coach types in the train include AC chair car, second class sitting, and general, but it does not have a pantry car. All the classes except general class require reservations. The train leaves Howrah junction at 06:05 to arrive at Azimganj Junction at 12:00, and leaves Azimganj at 15:40 to arrive at Howrah at 21:45.This name inspired by Tarun majumdar's movie which based on Nobel Prize nominated Tarasankar Bandopadhay's Same name novel Ganadevata (film).

== Important stopping points ==
1. Howrah
2. Seoraphuli Junction
3. Bandel
4. Burdwan
5. Guskara.
6. Bolpur Shantiniketan railway station
7. Prantik railway station
8. Ahmedpur
9. Sainthia Junction
10. Mallarpur
11. Rampurhat Junction
12. Nalhati
13. Azimganj Junction

Note: Bold letters indicates Major Railway Stations/Major Cities.

== Traction ==
On 1 September 2018, Howrah–Azimganj Ganadevta Express gets the electric traction, after the completion of route electrification up to Azimganj Junction (AZ), ER & it is regularly hauled by a Howrah-based WAP-4 / WAP-5 / WAP-7 electric locomotive from end to end.

== Rake sharing ==
This train used to share its rake with 22321/22 Hool Express. As of now, it shares its rake with 13015/16 Howrah - Jamalpur Kavi Guru Express and 12347/48 Sahid Express.
