= Howrah–Malda Town Intercity Express =

Howrah Malda Town Intercity Express
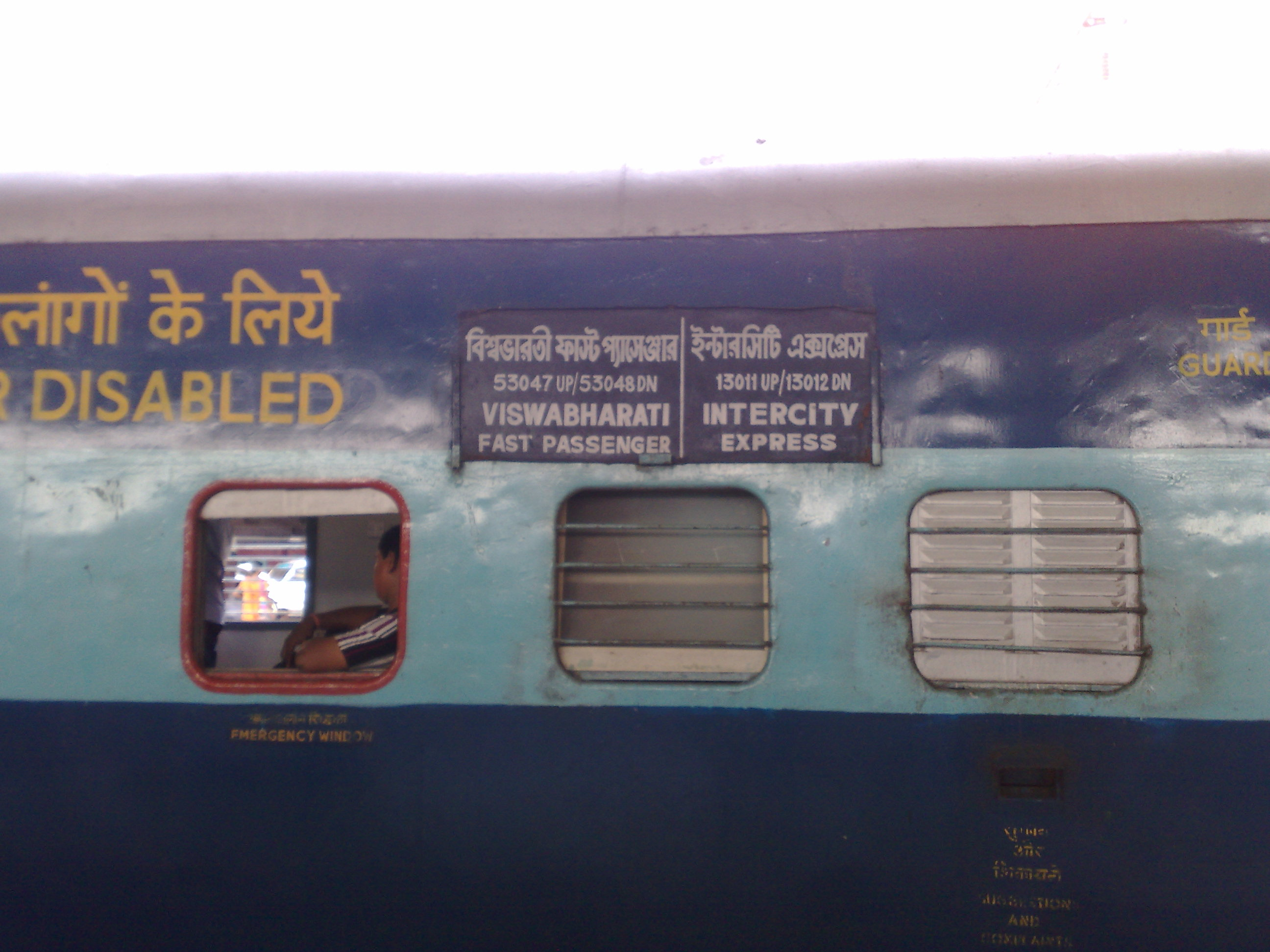

Overview
- Service type: Express
- Current operator: Eastern Railways

Route
- Termini: Howrah Junction; Malda Town
- Stops: 16 in both directions
- Distance travelled: 340 km (211 mi)
- Average journey time: 07 hours 25 minutes as 13011 Howrah Malda Town Intercity Express, 06 hours 55 minutes as 13012 Malda Town Howrah Intercity Express
- Service frequency: Daily
- Train number: 13011 / 13012

On-board services
- Classes: AC Chair Car, 2nd Class seating, Unreserved/General
- Seating arrangements: Yes
- Sleeping arrangements: No
- Catering facilities: No Pantry car coach attached
- Observation facilities: Rake Sharing with 53047 / 48 Viswabharati Fast Passenger

Technical
- Rolling stock: LHB coach
- Track gauge: 1,676 mm (5 ft 6 in)
- Operating speed: 110 km/h (68 mph) maximum 47.44 km/h (29 mph) including halts

The 13011 / 12 Howrah – Malda Town Intercity Express is an Express train belonging to Indian Railways - Eastern Railway zone that runs between Howrah Junction & Malda Town via Rampurhat in India.It previously ran between Howrah and Rampurhat, and was gradually extended—first up to Pakur, and then further to Malda Town.

It operates as train number 13011 from Howrah Junction to Malda Town and as train number 13012 in the reverse direction serving the states of West Bengal & Jharkhand.

== Coaches ==
The 13011 / 12 Howrah Malda Town Intercity Express presently has 2 AC Chair Car, 2 2nd Class seating, 14 Unreserved/General & 2 End on Generator coaches. It does not carry a Pantry car coach.

As is customary with most train services in India, Coach Composition may be amended at the discretion of Indian Railways depending on demand.

== Service ==
The 13011 Howrah Malda Town Intercity Express covers the distance of 340 kilometres in 07 hours 25 mins 45.84 km/h (28 mph) & in 06 hours 55 mins as 13012 Malda Town Howrah Intercity Express 49.16 km/h (31 mph).

== Routeing ==
The 13011 / 12 Howrah Malda Town Intercity Express runs from Howrah Junction via Bardhaman Junction, Bolpur Shantiniketan, Rampurhat Junction, New Farakka Junction to Malda Town.

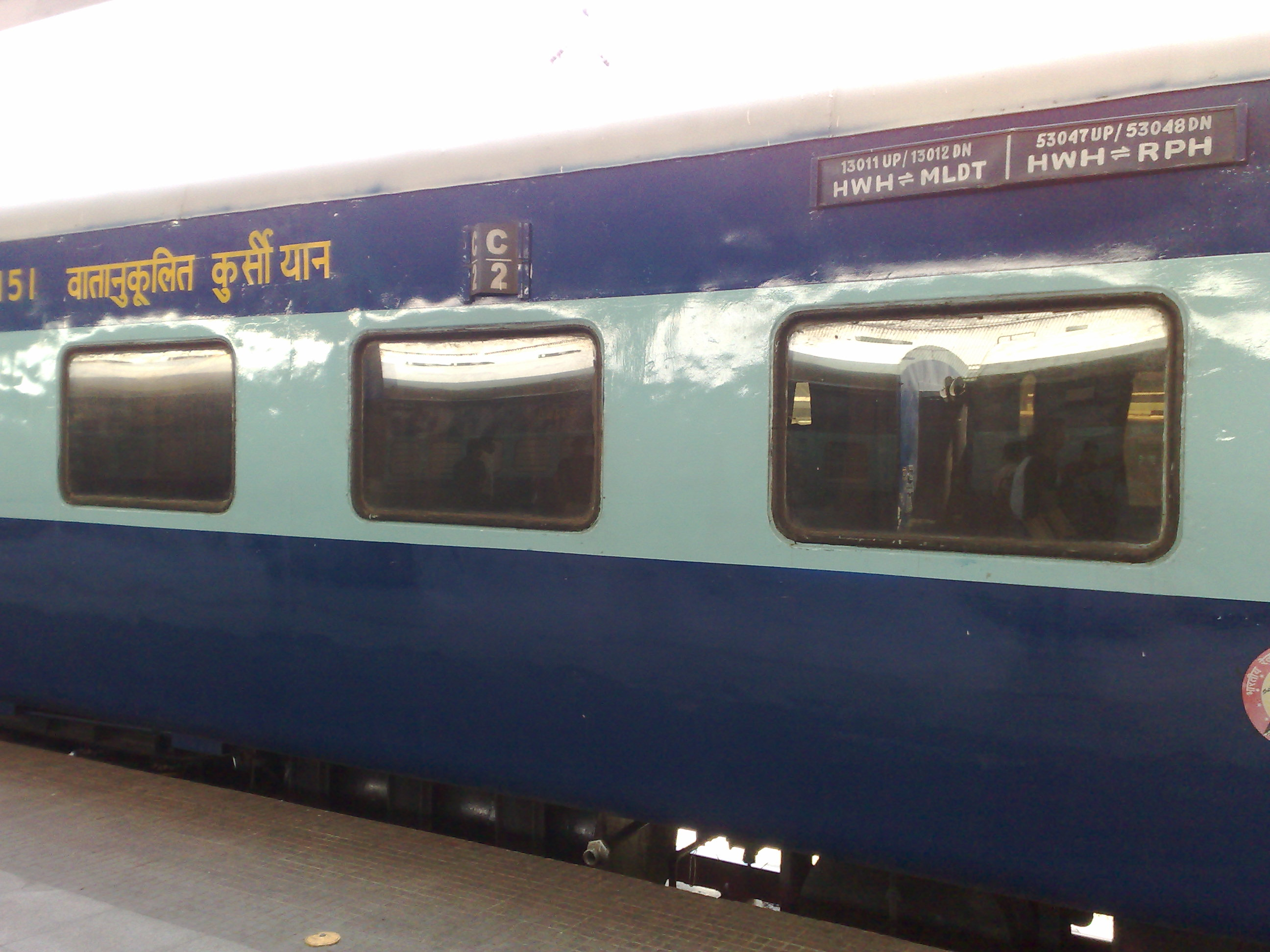
Howrah Malda Town Intercity Express - AC Chair Car

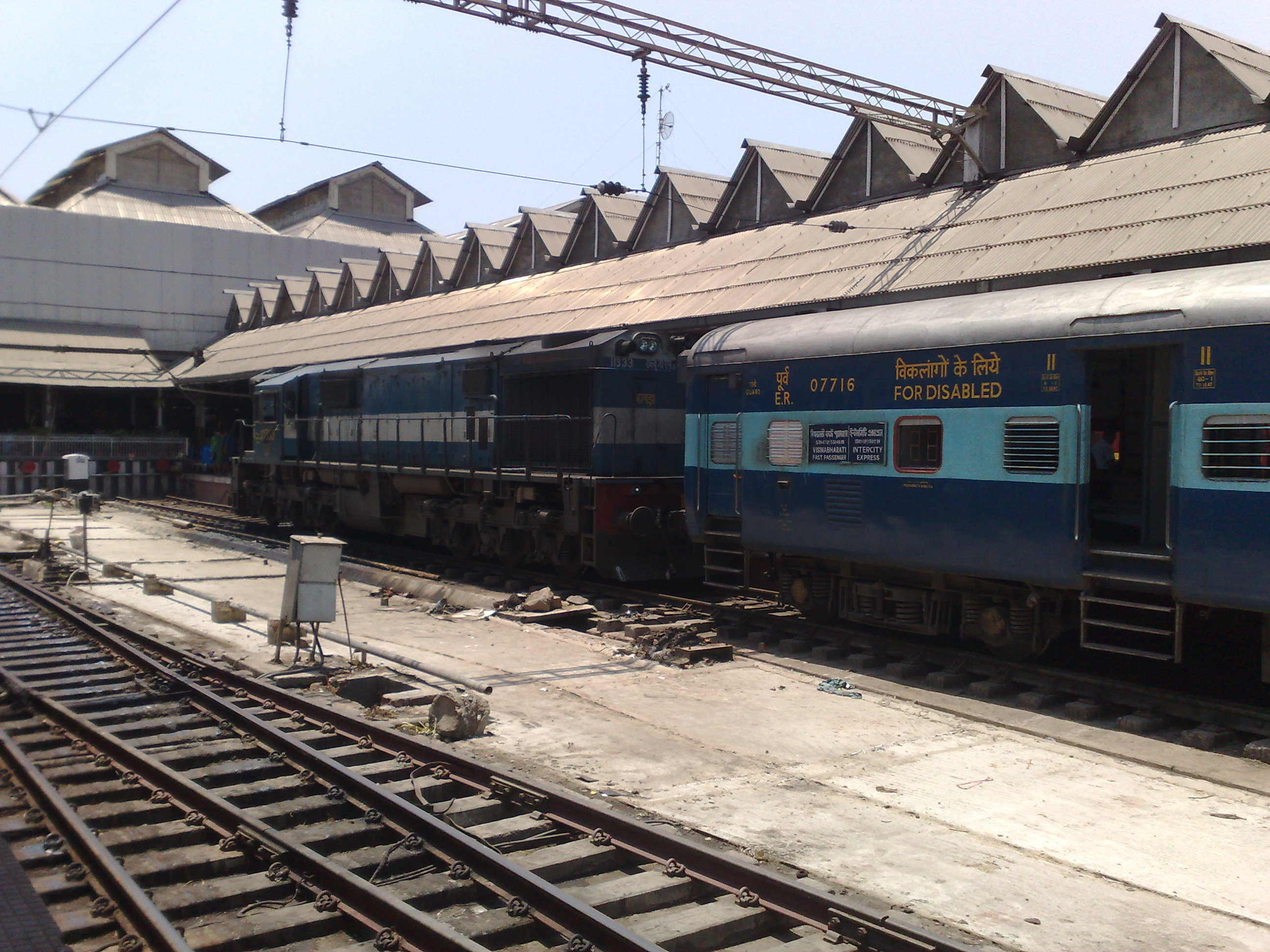
Howrah Malda Town Intercity Express at Howrah Junction

== Traction ==
Previously, a Howrah based WDM 3A / WDM 3D / WDP 4 powered the train for its entire journey.

As the route is now fully electrified, a Howrah based Indian locomotive class WAP-4 or WAP-7 or WAP-5 powers the train for its entire journey.

== Timings ==
13011 Howrah Malda Town Intercity Express leaves Howrah Junction on a daily basis at 15:25 hrs IST and reaches Malda Town at 22:55 hrs IST the same day.

13012 Malda Town Howrah Intercity Express leaves Malda Town on a daily basis at 04:30 hrs IST and reaches Howrah Junction at 11:25 hrs IST the same day.
