= Viswabharati Fast Passenger =

Train in India

Overview
- Service type: Passenger
- Locale: West Bengal
- First service: 4 July 1995 (30 Years ago)
- Current operator: Eastern Railways

Route
- Termini: Howrah (HWH); Rampurhat Junction (RPH)
- Stops: 21
- Distance travelled: 219 km (136 mi)
- Average journey time: 04:55 hours as 53047, 05:00 hours as 53048
- Service frequency: Daily
- Train number: 53047 / 53048

On-board services
- Classes: AC Chair Car, 2nd Class seating, General Unreserved
- Seating arrangements: Yes
- Sleeping arrangements: No
- Catering facilities: E-catering
- Observation facilities: Rake sharing with 13011 / 13012 Howrah–Malda Town Intercity Express

Technical
- Rolling stock: LHB coach
- Track gauge: 1,676 mm (5 ft 6 in)
- Operating speed: 105 km/h (65 mph) maximum, 45 km/h (28 mph) average including halts

The 53047 / 53048 Viswabharati Fast Passenger is a popular Passenger train belonging to Indian Railways – Eastern Railway zone that runs between Howrah and Rampurhat Junction in India. The Fast Passenger train stops at all stations between Rampurhat Junction and Barddhaman Junction. After Barddhaman, it halts at Bandel, Chandannagar, and Chuchura before reaching its final destination, Howrah. The same pattern is followed in reverse on the return journey.

This train has emerged as a lifeline for the people of Birbhum and Eastern Bardhaman districts, as it is the first early morning service connecting them to the state capital, Kolkata. It also offers the convenience of same-day return, allowing passengers to travel to Kolkata and return to their hometowns on the same day.

It is among the top passenger trains in India in terms of revenue generation. In both up and down directions, its operational priority surpasses that of several regular mail/express and even superfast trains. It is only one passenger category train in India that offers 2 (Two) AC Chair Car coaches. It also holds the distinction of being the first passenger train in India to be equipped with modern LHB coaches.

== Coach Composition ==
The 53047 / 53048 Howrah–Rampurhat Viswabharati Fast Passenger operates with modern LHB coaches and does not carry a pantry car. The train runs with a total of 18 coaches. The train shares its rake with the 13011 / 13012 Howrah–Malda Town Intercity Express via Rampurhat, and its coach composition is also the same.

Coach Composition of Rampurhat – Howrah Viswabharati Fast Passenger
Position	Coach	Description
Loco	Loco	Locomotive Engine
1	🚉 SLR	Seating-cum-Luggage Rake
2	💺 C1	AC Chair Car
3	💺 C2	AC Chair Car
4	🪑 D1	Second Class Reserved Seating
5	🪑 D2	Second Class Reserved Seating
6	🪑 D3	Second Class Reserved Seating
7	🪑 D4	Second Class Reserved Seating
8	🟩 GEN	General Unreserved
9	🟩 GEN	General Unreserved
10	🟩 GEN	General Unreserved
11	🟩 GEN	General Unreserved
12	🟩 GEN	General Unreserved
13	🟩 GEN	General Unreserved
14	🟩 GEN	General Unreserved
15	🟩 GEN	General Unreserved
16	🟩 GEN	General Unreserved
17	♿ LDS	Luggage-cum-Disabled-friendly Coach
EOG	⚡ EOG	End-On Generator

== Service ==
The 53047 Howrah–Rampurhat Viswabharti Fast Passenger covers the distance of 219 kilometers in 04 hours 55 mins (44.54 km/h) and in 05 hours 00 mins as 53048 Rampurhat–Howrah Viswabharti Fast Passenger (43.80 km/h).

As the average speed of the train is below 55 km/h (34 mph), as per Indian Railways rules, its fare does not include a Superfast surcharge.

== Routeing ==
The 53047 / 53048 Howrah–Rampurhat Viswabharti Fast Passenger runs from Howrah via Chandannagar, Chuchura, Bandel Junction, Barddhaman Junction, Guskara, Bolpur Shantiniketan, Ahmadpur Junction and Sainthia Junction.

== Traction ==
As the route is fully electrified, a Howrah-based WAP-7 or WAP-5 powers the train for its entire journey.

== Schedule ==
Rampurhat – Howrah Viswabharati Fast Passenger (53048/53047)
🚆 Train No.	🚉 Departure Station	⏰ Departure Time	📅 Departure Day	🏁 Arrival Station	⏰ Arrival Time	📅 Arrival Day
53048	Rampurhat Junction 🌾	05:10	Daily	Howrah Junction 🏙️	10:10	Same day
53047	Howrah Junction 🏙️	16:40	Daily	Rampurhat Junction 🌾	21:35	Same day

== Gallery ==
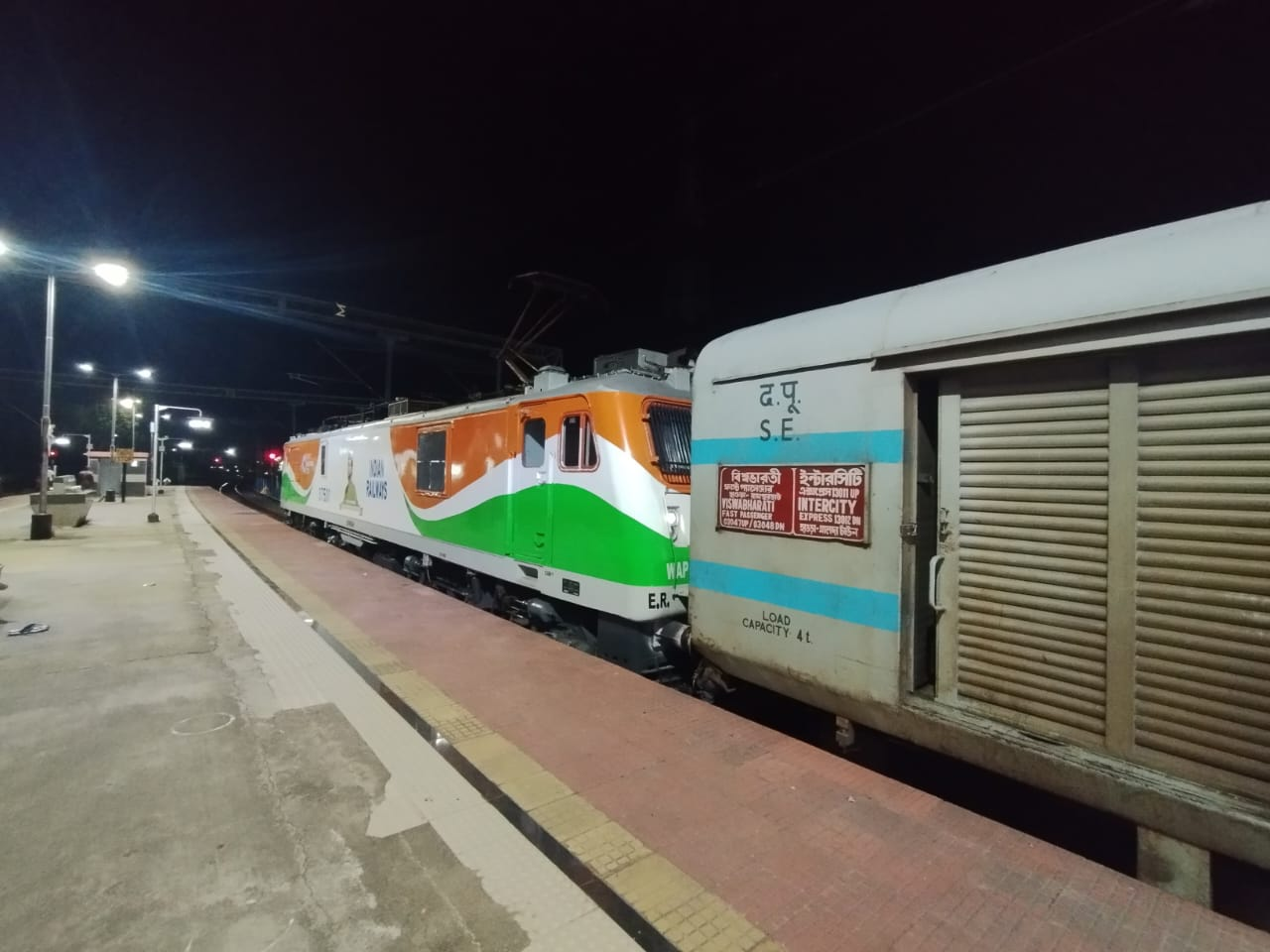
The Viswabharati Fast Passenger, led by WAP-7 locomotive 37501, at Rampurhat Junction on the special occasion of the 79th Independence Day.

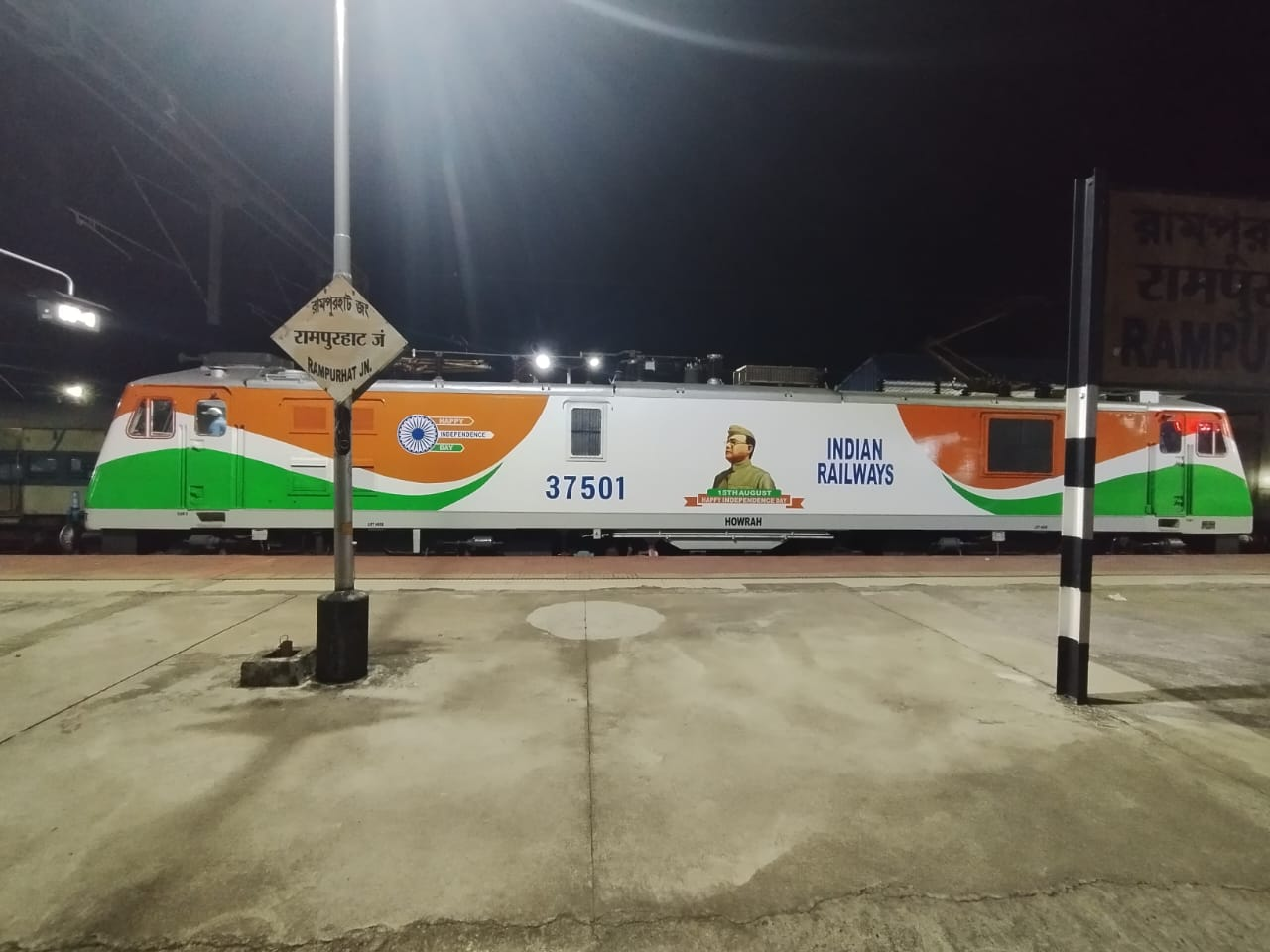
WAP-7 of Howrah, adorned with the tricolour and Netaji’s portrait, hauling the Viswabharati Fast Passenger at Rampurhat Junction upon completing its journey.

== See also ==
- Tarapith
- Rampurhat Junction railway station
- Howrah railway station
- Eastern Railway zone
