= Prantik railway station =

Railway station in West Bengal, India

Prantik প্রান্তিক
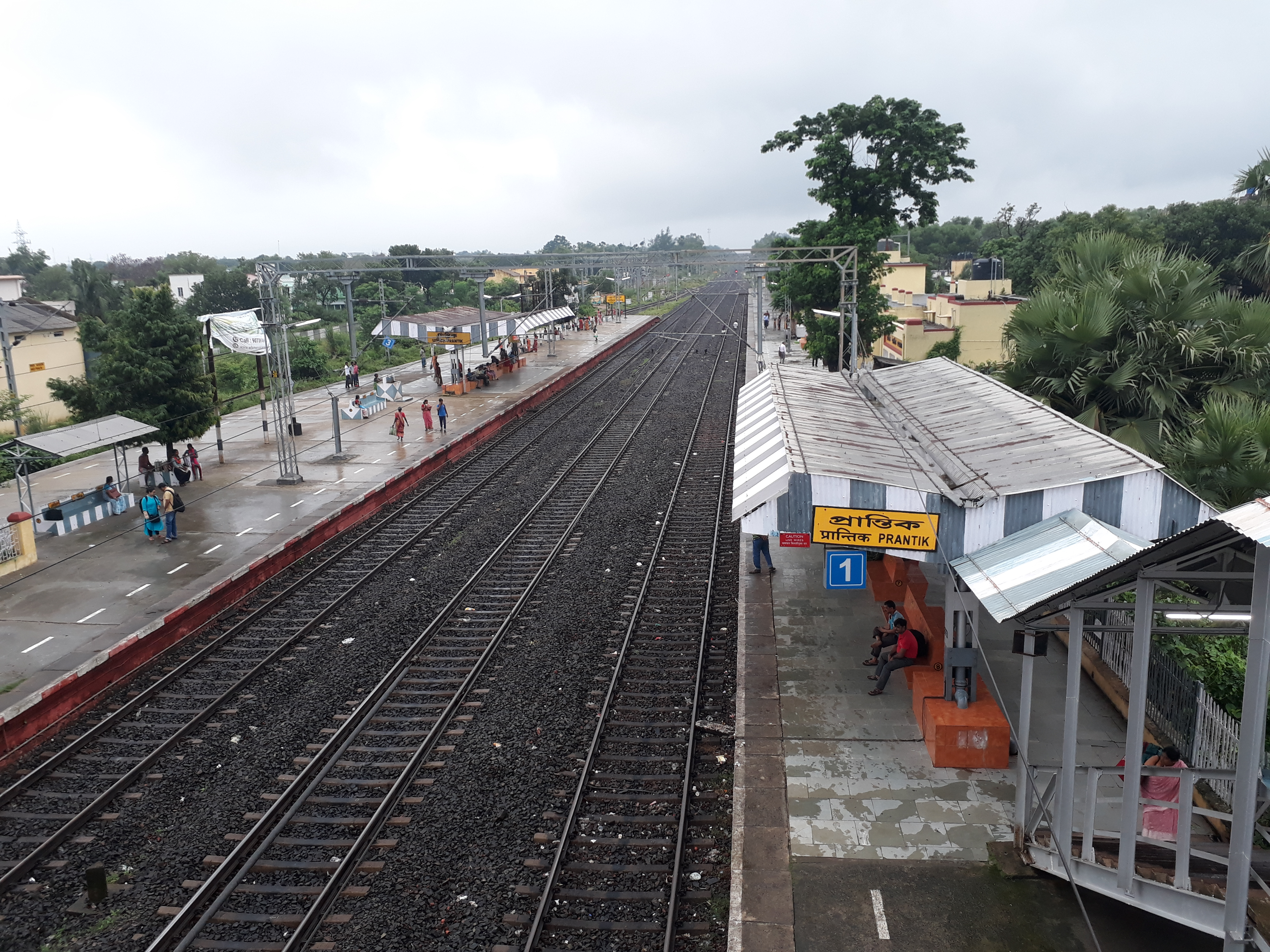
- Prantik railway station

General information
- Location: Prantik Township, Santiniketan, Bolpur, West Bengal; India
- Coordinates: 23.6951°N 87.6939°E
- Elevation: 50 metres (160 ft)
- System: Indian Railways station
- Owner: Indian Railways
- Line: Bardhaman-Rampurhat section
- Platforms: 3
- Tracks: 4

Construction
- Structure type: Standard (on-ground station)
- Parking: Yes
- Cycle facilities: Yes

Other information
- Status: Double-Line Electrification
- Station code: PNE
- Zone(s): Eastern Railway zone
- Division(s): Howrah

Services
Preceding station	Indian Railways	Following station
Kopai towards Kiul Junction	Eastern Railway zone Sahibganj loop	Bolpur Shantiniketan towards Khana Junction
Location
- Location within India Location within West Bengal

Prantik railway station is a railway station on the Bardhaman-Rampurhat Section.It is located in Birbhum district in the Indian state of West Bengal. Its code is PNE. This railway station serves Bolpur surrounding areas including Santiniketan. The station consists of three platforms and situated between Bolpur Shantiniketan and Kopai railway station.

== Trains ==
Number of trains that halt at Prantik railway station is 38. Few express and passengers trains stop there. Some of are:

- Howrah–New Jalpaiguri Jan Shatabdi Express
- Howrah–Maldah Town Passengers
- Sealdah–Rampurhat Passengers
- Howrah–Rampurhat Express
- Viswabharati Fast Passenger
- Sealdah–Rampurhat Intercity Express
- Ganadevata Express
- Howrah–Maldah Town Intercity Express
- Maa Tara Express
