= Maa Tara Express =

Train in India

Overview
- Service type: Express
- Locale: West Bengal
- First service: 6 September 2009; 17 years ago
- Current operator: Eastern Railway

Route
- Termini: Sealdah (SDAH); Rampurhat (RPH)
- Stops: 9
- Distance travelled: 226 km (140 mi)
- Average journey time: 3 hours 40 minutes
- Service frequency: Daily. (Note: in each direction)
- Train number: 13187 / 13188

On-board services
- Classes: AC Chair Car, Third AC Sleeper, Non AC Chair Car , General Unreserved
- Seating arrangements: Yes
- Sleeping arrangements: Yes
- Auto-rack arrangements: Overhead racks
- Catering facilities: E-Catering
- Observation facilities: Large windows
- Baggage facilities: Available
- Other facilities: Below the seats

Technical
- Rolling stock: ICF coach
- Track gauge: 1,676 mm (5 ft 6 in)
- Operating speed: 49 km/h (30 mph) average including halts.

The 13187 / 13188 Maa Tara Express is an express train of the Indian Railways connecting Sealdah and Rampurhat Junction in West Bengal. It is currently being operated with 13187/13188 train numbers on a daily basis. The Maa Tara express is used extensively by pilgrims going to visit the Tarapith temple of Rampurhat

== Service ==
The 13187/Maa Tara Express has an average speed of 46 km/h and covers 226.54 km in 4h 55m . The 13188/Maa Tara Express has an average speed of 48 km/h and covers 226.54 km in 4h 40m.

== Schedule Halts ==
The schedule of this 13187/13188 Sealdah–Rampurhat Maa Tara Express is given below:-

SDAH - RPH - SDAH Maa Tara Express
13187		Stations	13188	
Arrival	Departure	Stations	Arrival	Departure
SRC	07:20	Sealdah	18:45	DSTN
07:41	07:42	Barrackpore	17:53	17:54
07:54	07:56	Naihati Jn	17:46	17:48
08:30	08:32	Bandel Jn	16:56	16:58
09:22	09:24	Barddhaman Junction	16:04	16:06
10:01	10:03	Guskara	15:11	15:12
10:18	10:20	Bolpur Shantiniketan	14:54	14:56
10:28	10:29	Prantik	14:48	14:49
10:53	10:54	Sainthia Junction	14:26	14:28
11:12	11:13	Tarapith Road	14:15	14:16
11:55	DSTN	Rampurhat Junction	SRC	14:10

== Coach composite ==
The train has standard ICF rakes with max speed of 110 kmph. The train consists of 15 coaches :

Coach Composition of Rampurhat – Sealdah Maa Tara Express
Position	Coach	Description
Loco	Loco	Locomotive Engine
1	🚉 SLR	Seating-cum-Luggage Rake
2	💺 B1	3rd AC Sleeper (3A)
3	💺 C1	AC Chair Car
4	🪑 D1	Second Class Reserved Seating
5	🪑 D2	Second Class Reserved Seating
6	🪑 D3	Second Class Reserved Seating
7	🪑 D4	Second Class Reserved Seating
8	🪑 D5	Second Class Reserved Seating
9	🟩 GEN	General Unreserved
10	🟩 GEN	General Unreserved
11	🟩 GEN	General Unreserved
12	🟩 GEN	General Unreserved
13	🟩 GEN	General Unreserved
14	♿ LDS	Luggage-cum-Disabled-friendly Coach
EOG	⚡ EOG	End-On Generator

== Traction ==
Both trains are hauled by a Sealdah Loco Shed based WAP-7 electric locomotive from Sealdah to Rampurhat and vice versa.

== See also ==
- Tarapith
- Rampurhat railway station
- Sealdah railway station
- Sealdah - Rampurhat Intercity Express
