= Sealdah–Rampurhat Intercity Express =

Train in India

Sealdah-Rampurhat Intercity Express
Overview
- Service type: Superfast
- Locale: West Bengal
- First service: 12 January 2011; 15 years ago
- Last service: 10 May 2020 (Discontinued due to COVID)
- Current operator: Eastern Railway

Route
- Termini: Sealdah (SDAH); Rampurhat (RPH)
- Stops: 5
- Distance travelled: 214 km (133 mi)
- Average journey time: 3 hours 40 minutes
- Service frequency: 3 days a week. (Note: Runs three days in a week for every direction.)
- Train number: 12373 / 12374

On-board services
- Classes: Chair Car, General Unreserved
- Seating arrangements: Yes
- Sleeping arrangements: No
- Auto-rack arrangements: Overhead racks
- Catering facilities: E-catering only
- Observation facilities: Large windows
- Baggage facilities: No
- Other facilities: Below the seats

Technical
- Rolling stock: ICF coach
- Track gauge: 1,676 mm (5 ft 6 in)
- Operating speed: 58 km/h (36 mph) average including halts.
Route map
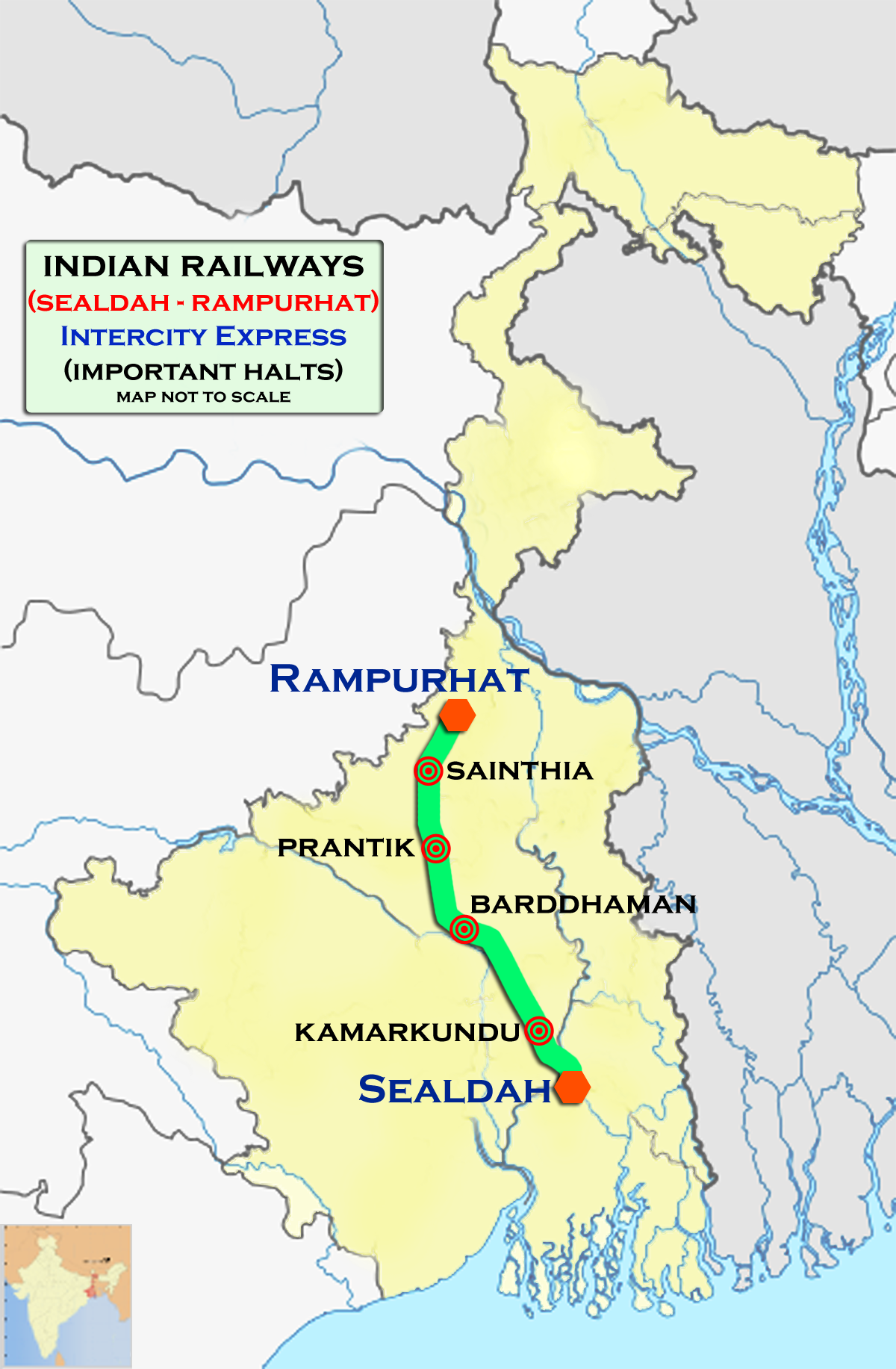

The 12373 / 12374 Sealdah-Rampurhat Intercity Superfast Express is a superfast train of the Indian Railways connecting Sealdah in West Bengal and Rampurhat Junction of West Bengal. It was operated under train numbers 12373/12374 on a thrice-weekly basis. The service is currently cancelled and no longer operates. Before its cancellation, it ran from Rampurhat on Mondays, Thursdays, and Saturdays, and from Sealdah on Wednesdays, Fridays, and Sundays.

== Service ==
The 12373/Sealdah - Rampurhat Intercity Express has an average speed of 58 km/h and covers 214.8 km in 3 hrs 40 mins. 12374/Rampurhat - Sealdah Intercity Express has an average speed of 58 km/h and covers 214.8 km in 3 hrs 40 mins.

== Route and halts ==
The important halts of the train are:

- Sealdah
- Kamarkundu
- Barddhaman Junction
- Bolpur Shantiniketan
- Prantik
- Sainthia Junction
- Rampurhat Junction

== Coach composite ==
The train has standard ICF rakes with max speed of 110 kmph. The train consists of 10 coaches :

- 1 Chair Car
- 6 General
- 2 Second-class Luggage/parcel van

== Traction ==
Both trains are hauled by a Howrah Loco Shed based WAP-4 / WAP-5 / WAP-7 electric locomotive from Sealdah to Rampurhat and vice versa.

== Rake sharing ==
The train shares its rake with 13013/13014 Barddhaman - Rampurhat Express

== See also ==
- Sealdah railway station
- Rampurhat railway station
- Barddhaman - Rampurhat Express
- Maa Tara Express
