= 2013 Chapramari Forest train accident =

Train accident in India

Chapramari Forest train accident

Details
- Date: 13 November 2013; 17:40
- Location: Chapramari Wildlife Sanctuary, Jalpaiguri district, West Bengal
- Country: India
- Cause: speeding

Statistics
- Trains: 1 Udaipur City–Kamakhya Kavi Guru Express
- Vehicles: WDP-4D locomotive
- Deaths: 5 adult
- Injured: 10 elephants

The 2013 Chapramari Forest train accident occurred on 13 November 2013 in the eastern area of the Chapramari Wildlife Sanctuary between Chalsa and Nagrakata in the Jalpaiguri district of West Bengal.

The crash killed and injured at least 17 elephants and was described as the worst of its kind in recent history.

== Background ==
The Wildlife Protection Society of India reported that 20 elephants were killed in 2007.

The number of wild elephants in all of India is thought to be about 26,000.

== Accident ==
At approximately 17:40 on 13 November 2013, an Assam-bound passenger train travelling through the Chapramari Forest, Udaipur City–Kamakhya Kavi Guru Express (19709) with WDP-4D locomotive, approached the Jaldhaka River Bridge at ~80 km/h and collided with a herd of 40 to 50 elephants, killing five adults and two calves and injuring ten others.

The surviving elephants fled but soon returned to the scene of the crash and remained there until being dispersed by officials.

== Aftermath ==
The track was reopened for service after 12 hours. A meeting to discuss measures to prevent similar collisions was held between forest and railway officials on 14 November. One female elephant suffered a fractured leg in the crash before falling into a ravine below the tracks. She was unreachable by cranes, and veterinarians set up a camp to treat her. The carcass of one elephant was lodged in the bridge and was cut apart by authorities.

=== Jalpaiguri protest ===
A protest seeking better regulation for trains passing through the wildlife sanctuary occurred on 14 November in Jalpaiguri. In an unrelated statement by West Bengal's forest minister, Hiten Burman, it was noted that official requests to a similar effect have been disregarded by railway authorities in the past.

=== Repercussions ===
The crash reignited discussion over the history and administration of the 168 km track, which runs from New Jalpaiguri to Alipurduar and also passes through Buxa Tiger Reserve. Animesh Basu, a coordinator for the Himalayan Nature and Adventure Foundation, criticised the government's response to the issue of its national heritage animal being frequently hit by trains, highlighting the irony of Indian Railways' use of an elephant calf as its mascot.

Electric fencing, stationary lighting, and motion sensors have each been proposed as technical measures to prevent similar incidents in the future.

== Investigation ==
Officials said they would investigate the crash. Excessive speed was suspected as a possible contributing factor. The train was traveling at 80 km/h and guidelines specify a limit of 40 km/h.

== Reaction ==
Minister of State for Railways Adhir Ranjan Chowdhury stated that the accident "happened outside the area which has been earmarked as elephant corridor" and that it "is the responsibility of the state government to protect the wildlife [because] railway officials cannot".
