= Udaipur City–Kamakhya Kavi Guru Express =

Train in India

Overview
- Service type: Express
- First service: 14 November 2011; 14 years ago
- Current operator: North Western Railway

Route
- Termini: Udaipur City (UDZ); Kamakhya (KYQ)
- Stops: 41
- Distance travelled: 2,611 km (1,622 mi)
- Average journey time: 57 hrs 25 mins
- Service frequency: Weekly
- Train number: 19615 / 19616

On-board services
- Classes: AC 2 Tier, AC 3 Tier, Sleeper Class, General Unreserved
- Seating arrangements: Yes
- Sleeping arrangements: Yes
- Catering facilities: Available
- Observation facilities: Large windows
- Baggage facilities: No
- Other facilities: Below the seats

Technical
- Rolling stock: LHB coach
- Track gauge: 1,676 mm (5 ft 6 in)
- Operating speed: 46 km/h (29 mph) average including halts.

The 19615 / 19616 Udaipur City–Kamakhya Kavi Guru Express is an Express train of the Kavi Guru series belonging to Indian Railways – North Western Railway zone that runs between Udaipur City, Rajasthan and Kamakhya, Assam in India.

It operates as train number 19615 from Udaipur City to Kamakhya and as train number 19606 in the reverse direction, serving the states of Rajasthan, Uttar Pradesh, Bihar, West Bengal and Assam.

For the convenience of passengers, Kavi Guru Express was extended up to Udaipur City in 2019.

== Coaches ==
The 19615 / 19616 Udaipur City–Kamakhya Kavi Guru Express has 1 AC 2 tier, 5 AC 3 tier, 8 Sleeper class, 6 General Unreserved and 2 SLR (Seating cum Luggage Rake) coaches. It carries a pantry car

As is customary with most train services in India, coach composition may be amended at the discretion of Indian Railways depending on demand.

== Service ==
19615 Udaipur City–Kamakhya Kavi Guru Express covers the distance of 2,611 km (1,622 mi) in 56 hours 05 mins (45.92 km/h) and in 57 hours 25 mins as 19616 Kamakhya–Udaipur City Kavi Guru Express (46.65 km/h).

As the average speed of the train is below 55 km/h (34 mph), as per Indian Railways rules, its fare does not include a Superfast surcharge.

== Routeing ==
The 19615 / 19616 Udaipur City–Kamakhya Kavi Guru Express runs from

RAJASTHAN

- Udaipur City via
- Rana Pratap Nagar
- Mavli Junction
- Chanderiya
- Ajmer Junction
- Jaipur Junction
- Bandikui Junction
- Bharatpur Junction

UTTAR PRADESH

- Achhnera Junction
- Mathura Junction
- Hathras City
- Kasganj Junction
- Farrukhabad Junction
- Kanpur Central
- Lucknow Charbagh
- Ayodhya Junction
- Faizabad Junction
- Gorakhpur Junction
- Deoria Sadar

BIHAR

- Siwan Junction
- Muzaffarpur Junction
- Barauni Junction
- Katihar Junction

WEST BENGAL

- New Jalpaiguri (Siliguri)
- Dalgaon Railway Station
- Alipurduar Junction to

ASSAM

- Kamakhya Railway Station

It reverses direction of travel at Achhnera Junction.

== Traction ==
earlier was WDP-4D. The train is hauled by an Vadodara Loco Shed-based WAP-7 locomotive from Kamakhya to Udaipur and vice-versa .

== Operation ==
- 19615 Udaipur City–Kamakhya Kavi Guru Express runs from Udaipur City every Monday reaching Kamakhya on the 3rd day.
- 19616 Kamakhya–Udaipur City Kavi Guru Express runs from Kamakhya every Thursday reaching Udaipur City on the 3rd day.

== Incidents ==
At approximately 17:40 on 13 November 2013, Kamakhya-bound train Udaipur City–Kamakhya Kavi Guru Express travelling through Chapramari Wildlife Sanctuary, between Chalsa and Nagrakata approached the Jaldhaka River Bridge at approximately 80 km/h (50 mph) and collided with a herd of 40–50 Indian elephants, killing five adults, two calves, and injuring ten others. This incident details is 2013 Chapramari Forest train accident Surviving elephants initially fled but soon returned to the scene of the accident and remained there until being dispersed by officials.

== See also ==
- Kavi Guru Express
