= Nimitala =

Nimitala is a place at Mollarpur town, near Fatepur, Birbhum district, West Bengal, India.

== Demographics ==
Here a shivalinga . Here a "smasan" i.e. burning place and a grand field is situated. A grand fair is held every year from shivaratri.

The name "Nimitala" come from 'Nirmalakseswara' shiva. Here the central temple is of Sri Sri Ramkrishna and Maa Sharada.

== Amba ==
Amba village is a village ( now ward / para) of Mollarpur. Amba is a mouza also. Here a primary school, an anganwari centre at Amba. It is Mollarpur III/XII.
