= Guskara railway station =

Railway station in West Bengal

Guskara গুসকরা
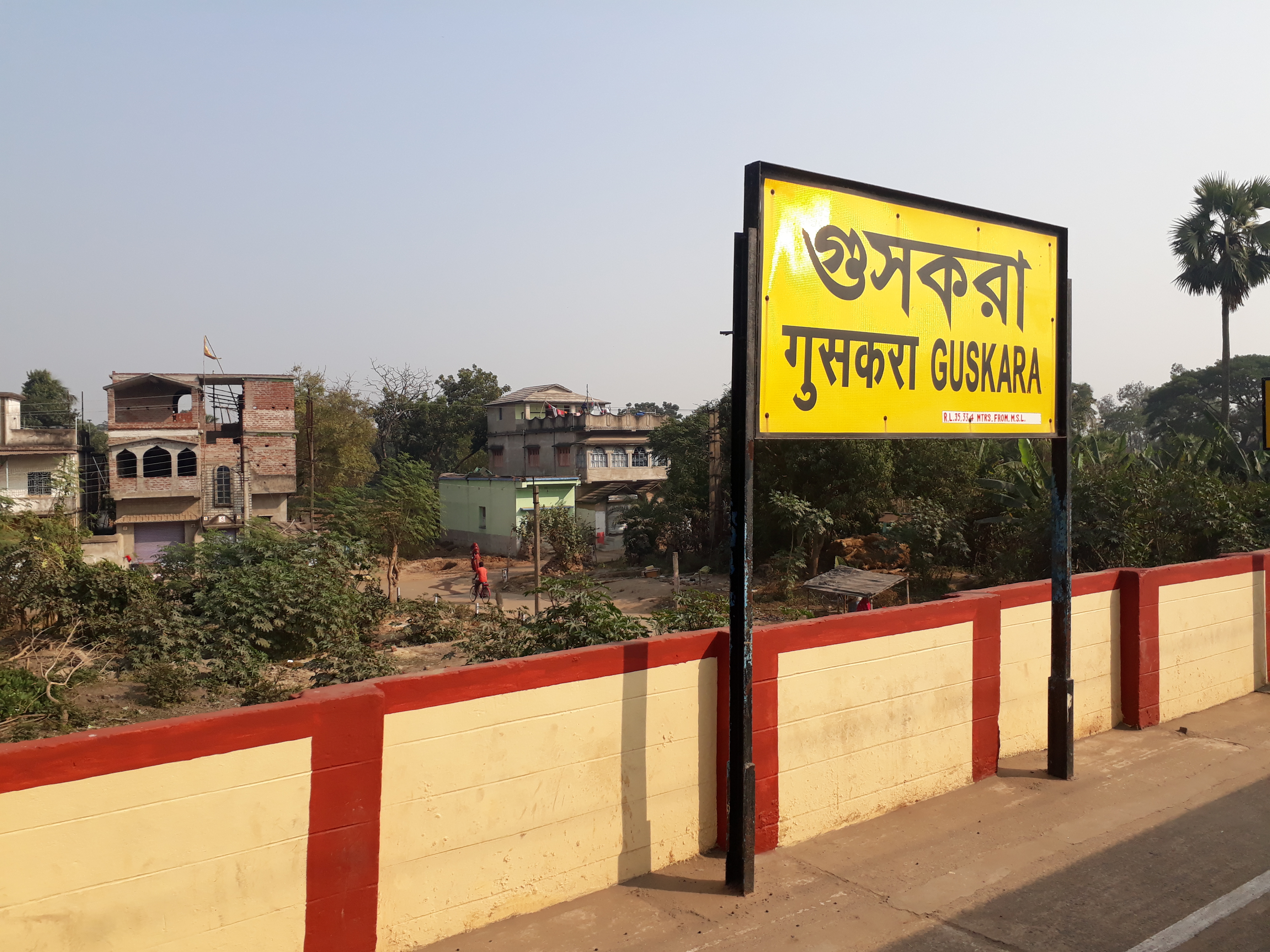

General information
- Location: Guskara-Dignagar Road, Guskara, Purba Bardhaman, West Bengal; India
- Coordinates: 23.489998°N 87.733397°E
- Elevation: 40 metres (130 ft)
- System: Indian Railways station
- Owner: Indian Railways
- Line: Bardhaman-Rampurhat section
- Platforms: 2
- Tracks: 2

Construction
- Structure type: At grade
- Parking: yes
- Cycle facilities: yes

Other information
- Status: Double-Line Electrification
- Station code: GKH
- Zone(s): Eastern Railway
- Division(s): Howrah

History
- Opened: 1860

Services
Preceding station	Indian Railways	Following station
Pichkurir Dhal towards Kiul Junction	Eastern Railway zone Sahibganj loop	Noadar Dhal towards Khana Junction
Location
- Location within West Bengal Location within India

Guskara railway station is a railway station on the Bardhaman-Rampurhat Section under Howrah railway division of Eastern Railway zone. It is situated beside Guskara–Dignagar Road at Guskara in Purba Bardhaman district in the Indian state of West Bengal. Toatal 40 express and passenger trains stop at Guskara railway station. It is a NSG-5 (non suburban group-5) category rail station.

== Trains ==
Some of the major trains available from Guskara railway station are as follows:

- Sealdah-Rampurhat Maa Taara Express
- Sealdah-Bamanhat Uttar Banga Express
- Howrah-Bolpur Shantiniketan Express
- Howrah–Jamalpur Express
- Howrah–Malda Town Intercity Express
- Howrah-Azimganj Ganadevata Express

List of Train Services Still Suspended Post COVID-19 :

- 12373/74 Sealdah-Rampurhat Triweekly Intercity Express
- 13013/14 Rampurhat - Bardhaman Triweekly Express
- 13119/20 Sealdah - Anvt Upper India Express (2 Days a week)
- 13133/34 Sealdah - Varanasi Upper India Express (5 Days a week)
- 53043/44 Howrah - Rajgir Fast Passenger (Daily)
- 53417/18 Bardhaman - Malda Town Passenger (Daily)
