= NRX (disambiguation) =

NRX is a nuclear reactor in Canada.

NRX may also refer to:

- Ngomburr language (ISO 639-3: nrx), a supposed extinct Australian Aboriginal language
- Noadar Dhal railway station (Indian Railways station code: NRX), West Bengal, India
- Norse Air (ICAO: NRX), a South African charter airline
- Neo-reactionary movement, also called Dark Enlightenment, a philosophical and political movement deemed neo-fascist by many
