= Jhapater Dhal railway station =

Railway Station in West Bengal

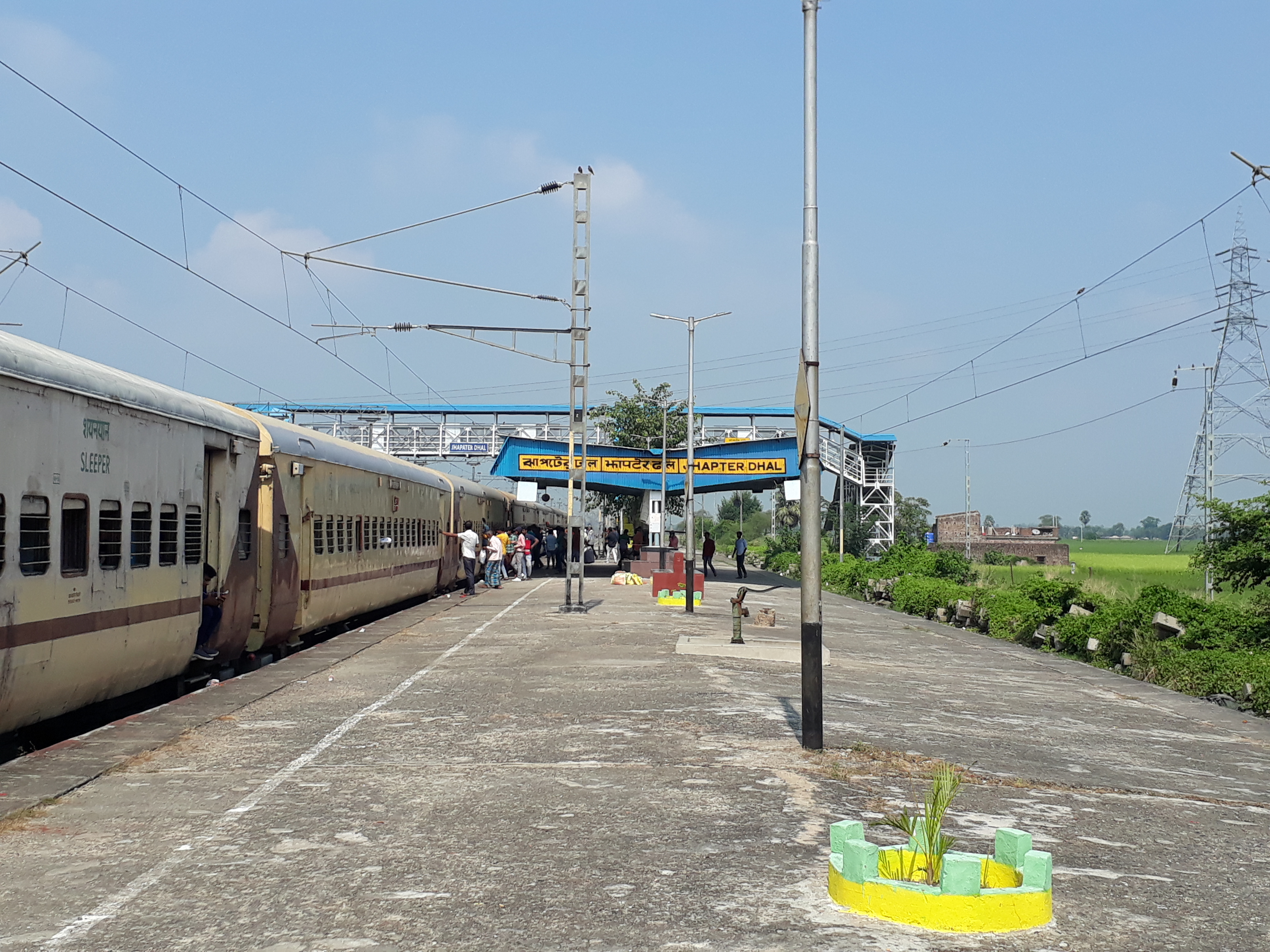

General information
- Location: Sankari, Purba Bardhaman district, West Bengal; India
- Coordinates: 23.367646°N 87.750181°E
- Elevation: 42 metres (138 ft)
- System: Indian Railways station
- Owner: Indian Railways
- Line: Barddhaman–Rampurhat section
- Platforms: 4
- Tracks: 2

Construction
- Structure type: Standard (on-ground station)

Other information
- Status: Double-line electrification
- Station code: JTL
- Zone(s): Eastern Railway zone
- Division(s): Howrah

History
- Opened: 1860

Services
Preceding station	Indian Railways	Following station
Banpas towards Kiul Junction	Eastern Railway zone Sahibganj loop	Khana Junction Terminus
Location
- Location within West Bengal Location within India

Jhapater Dhal railway station is a railway station on the Barddhaman–Rampurhat section under Howrah railway division of Eastern Railway zone. It is situated at Sankari in Purba Bardhaman district in the Indian state of West Bengal.
