= Pichkurir Dhal railway station =

Railway Station in West Bengal

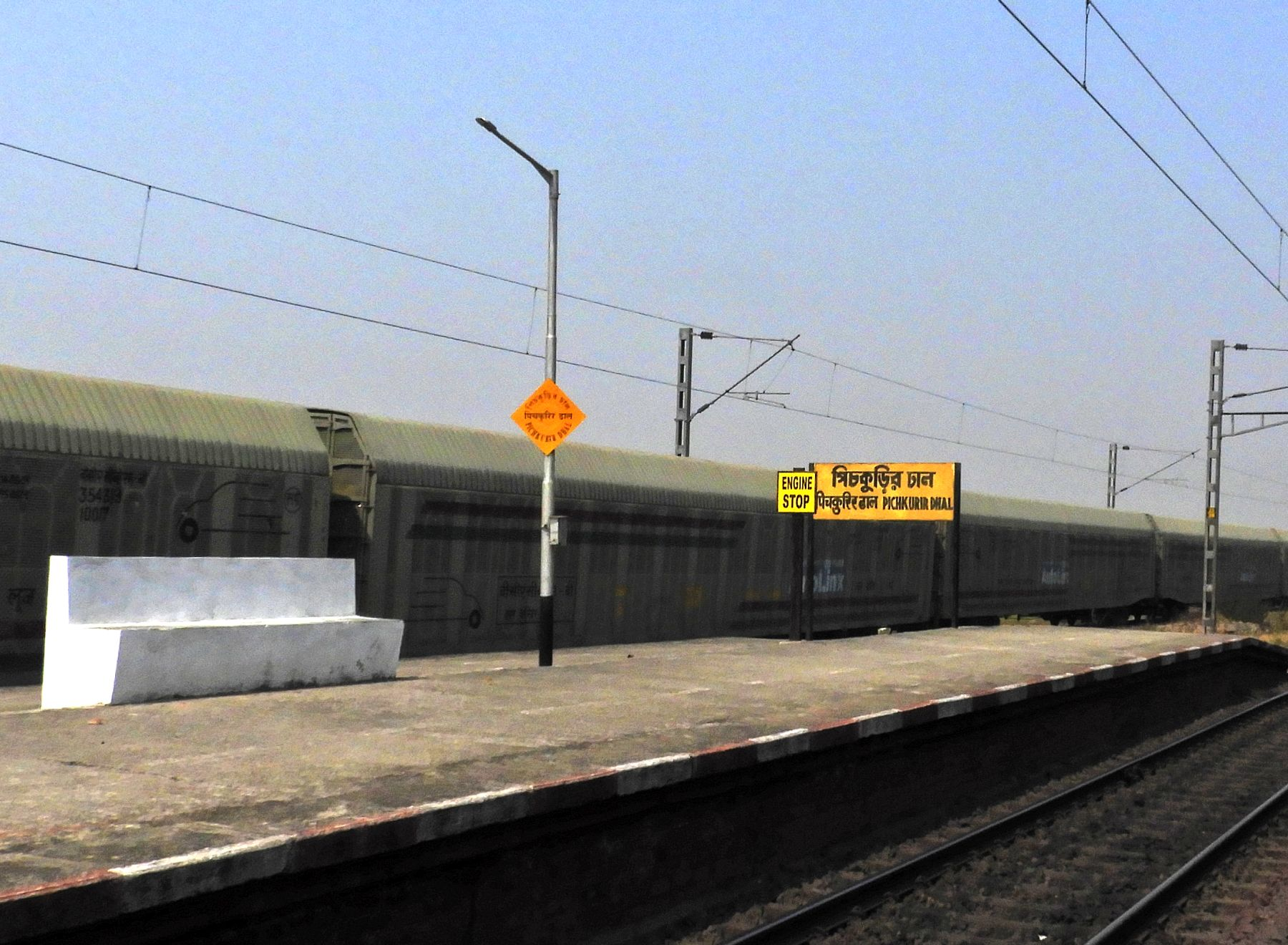
- Pichkurir Dhal railway station

General information
- Location: Gangarampur, Pichkuri, Purba Bardhaman district, West Bengal; India
- Coordinates: 23.54342°N 87.720914°E
- Elevation: 38 metres (125 ft)
- System: Indian Railways station
- Owner: Indian Railways
- Line: Bardhaman-Rampurhat section
- Platforms: 3
- Tracks: 2

Construction
- Structure type: Standard (on-ground station)

Other information
- Status: Double-Line Electrification
- Station code: PCQ
- Zone(s): Eastern Railway zone
- Division(s): Howrah

History
- Opened: 1860

Services
Preceding station	Indian Railways	Following station
Bhedia towards Kiul Junction	Eastern Railway zone Sahibganj loop	Guskara towards Khana Junction
Location
- Location within West Bengal Location within India

Pichkurir Dhal railway station is a railway station on the Bardhaman-Rampurhat Section under Howrah railway division of Eastern Railway zone. It is situated at Gangarampur, Pichkuri near Guskara in Purba Bardhaman district in the Indian state of West Bengal.
