= National Highway 114 (India) =

National highway in India

National Highway 114
- Map of National Highway 114 in red
- Schematic map of National Highways in India

Route information
- Length: 109 km (68 mi)

Major junctions
- From: Mallarpur
- To: Barddhaman

Location
- Country: India

Highway system
- Roads in India; Expressways; National; State; Asian
← NH 14	→ NH 114

National Highway 114 (NH 114) is a National Highway in India. It links Mallarpur, Sainthia, Ahmedpur, Bolpur, Bhedia, Guskara, Talit and Barddhaman in the state of West Bengal.
