= Banpas railway station =

Railway station in West Bengal

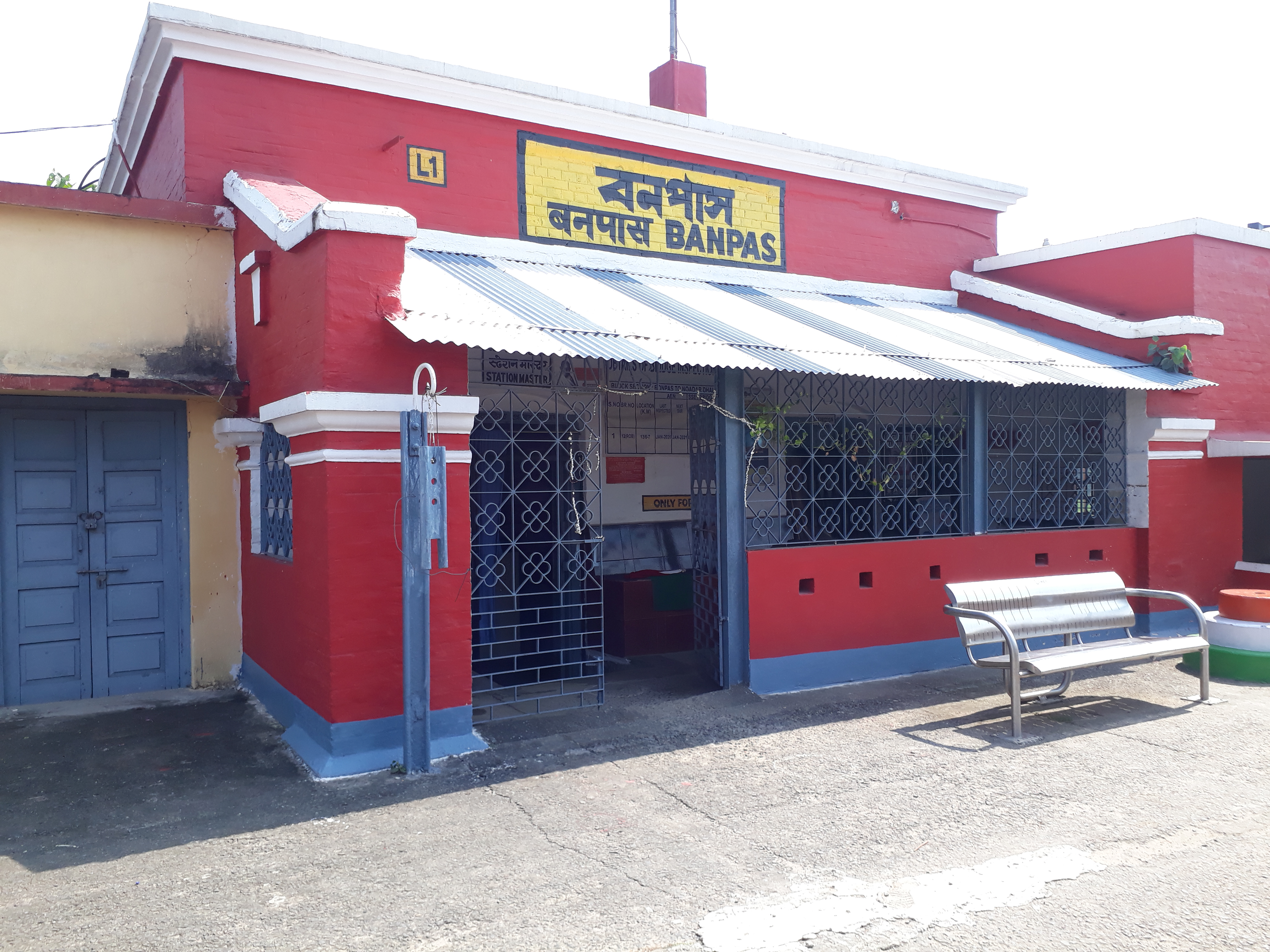

General information
- Location: Banpas, Belari, Purba Bardhaman district, West Bengal; India
- Coordinates: 23.400731°N 87.747251°E
- Elevation: 46 metres (151 ft)
- System: Indian Railways station
- Owner: Indian Railways
- Line: Barddhaman–Rampurhat section
- Platforms: 3
- Tracks: 2

Construction
- Structure type: Standard (on-ground station)

Other information
- Status: Double-line electrification
- Station code: BPS
- Zone(s): Eastern Railway zone
- Division(s): Howrah

History
- Opened: 1860

Services
Preceding station	Indian Railways	Following station
Noadar Dhal towards Kiul Junction	Eastern Railway zone Sahibganj loop	Jhapater Dhal towards Khana Junction
Location
- Location within West Bengal Location within India

Banpas railway station is a railway station on the Barddhaman–Rampurhat section under Howrah railway division of Eastern Railway zone. It is situated at Belari, Banpas in Purba Bardhaman district in the Indian state of West Bengal.
