= Basra International Airport =

Basrah International Airport مطار البصرة الدولي
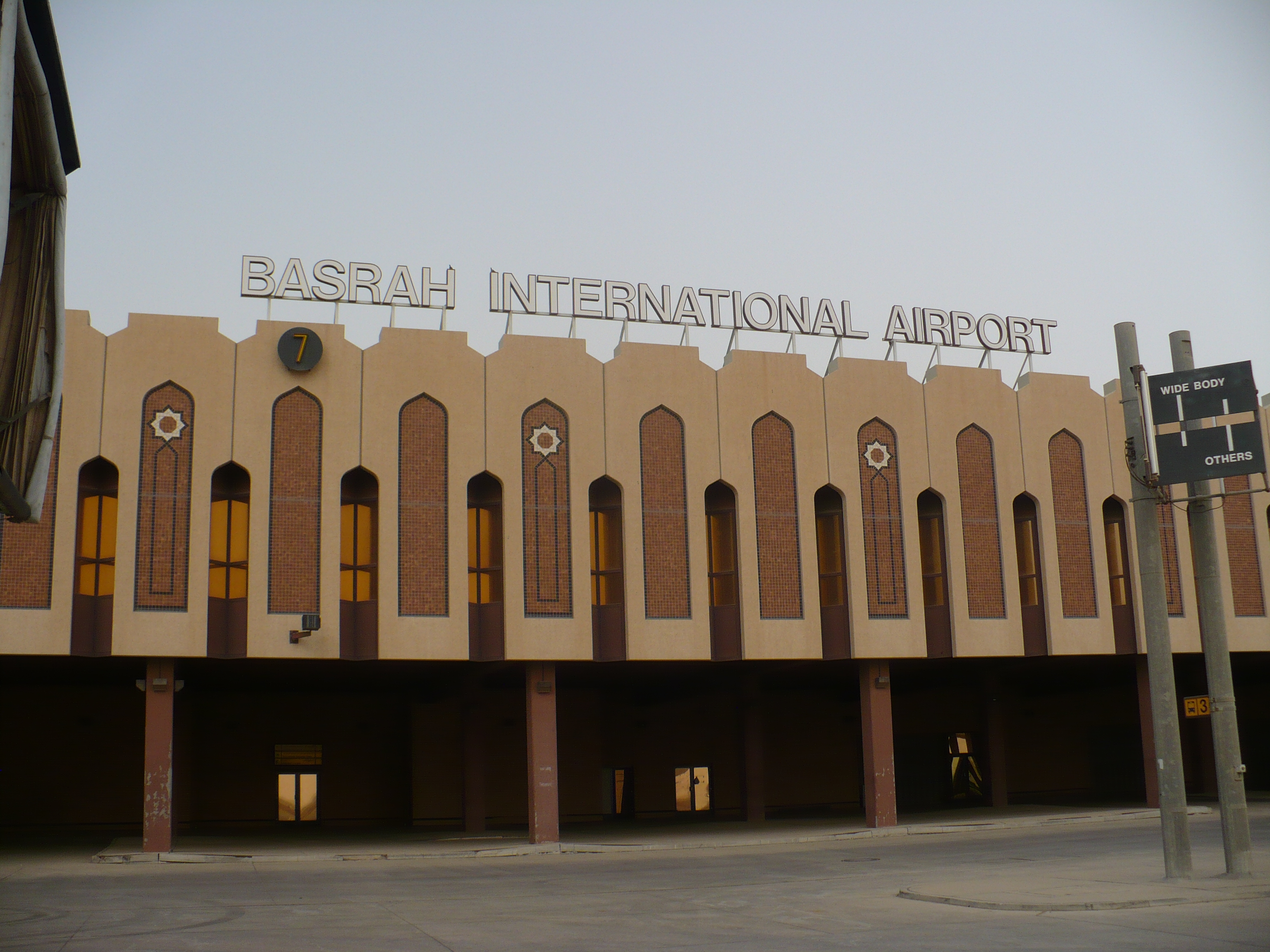
- IATA: BSR; ICAO: ORMM

Summary
- Airport type: Military/Public
- Operator: Iraqi Government
- Serves: Basra, Iraq
- Hub for: Iraqi Airways
- Elevation AMSL: 11 ft / 3 m
- Coordinates: 30°32′56.0″N 47°39′44.9″E

Map
- Location of airport in Iraq

Runways
Direction	Length		Surface
Direction	ft	m	Surface
14/32	13,124	4,000	Concrete

Statistics (2022)
- Passengers: 535,082
- Aircraft operations: 6,871
- Source: ICAA, COSIT.

Basra International Airport (Arabic: مطار البصرة الدولي, romanized: Maṭār al-Baṣrah ad-Duwaliyy) (IATA: BSR, ICAO: ORMM) is international airport in Iraq, serving the southern city of Basra. As of 2022, Basra International Airport is the fourth-busiest airport by total passenger traffic and aircraft operations in the country, behind the airports in Baghdad, Najaf and Erbil.

== History ==
=== Old airport ===
The old airport was situated about 6 miles to the east from the current one, on the right bank of Shatt Al-Arab (so it can accommodate the seaplanes). In 1937-1938 an airport terminal for Imperial Airways was built by British architects James Mollison Wilson and Harold Mason with an unusual appearance resembling an imperial palace.

=== Construction ===
The airport was built in the 1980s and then developed in the 1980s by the Iraqi Government department State Organisation for Roads and Bridges (SORB) as a gateway to the only port in Iraq. It is claimed that the airport was built only as a facility for VIPs and was only used rarely.

=== Renovation and military use ===
Renovation of the airport was supposed to proceed with the construction of a new terminal under German contract but the project prematurely ceased with the outbreak of the 1991 Gulf War. Actual development proceeded in the airport only after the 2003 US led invasion of Iraq. Some facilities were refurbished under a contract by United States Agency for International Development. The project is broad as it includes building air traffic control towers and other navigational facilities, as well as the construction of transportation and communications facilities.

The airport was eventually reopened in June 2004. The event was marked by the traditional sheep sacrifice as an Iraqi Airways Boeing 727 jet landed from Baghdad. It was the beginning of a new domestic service in Iraq between Baghdad and Basra. However, many of the passengers complained about the lack of basic facilities. Problems included air conditioning and toilets.

Reconstruction of the airport is still under way to improve the facilities. Iraqi Airways has already operated routes from this airport, and was its second hub.

Between 2003 and 2009 there was a significant Royal Air Force presence at the airport as No. 903 Expeditionary Air Wing was deployed here with a variety of fixed-wing and rotary such as:

Fixed-wing

- Hawker Siddeley Nimrod MR.2
- Lockheed Martin C-130J Super Hercules C.4 & C.5
- British Aerospace 125

Rotary

- Boeing Chinook HC.2
- Westland Sea King HC.4
- Westland Lynx AH.7/AH.9
- Westland Gazelle AH.1
- Westland Puma HC.1
- Westland Merlin HC.3

The unit was re-deployed to Camp Bastion, Afghanistan during mid 2009.

The United States Army has also deployed a number of aircraft to Basra irregularly:

- Boeing AH-64 Apache

The Danish Air Force also deployed some aircraft:

- Eurocopter Squirrel

== Ground operations ==
Following the American control and since 2002, SkyLink Arabia has been providing ground operations and fuel supply at the airport. In 2014 Group holding services with its subsidiary Basra ground handling services company with the partnership of Iraq airways took over the ground handling operations at the airport. In 2021 Lebanese Air Transport- Charter Ground Handling company took over the Ground handling and cargo operations at the airport with the partnership with the Directorate of Iraqi Airports. During 2010 access to the airport was strictly controlled by checkpoints situated at the main Airport entrance. Navigating this was done strictly on the production of a flight reference number for outward travel. The US Government (USG), accommodated at the adjacent US Consulate, required dedicated transfer services from the Consulate to the Airport terminal. A newly established company, Personal Transition Services (PTS), was contracted by several of the USG elements to perform this service. The company started by providing services directly to and from the Airport, but quickly grew into a company that provide full life support services further to the south close to the Iraq/Kuwait border at Safwan. PTS became the first International company to have a desk inside the main Airport terminal, from where the locally employed staff were able to provide both English and Arabic speaking services.

== Airlines and destinations ==
Airlines	Destinations
AJet	Istanbul–Sabiha Gökçen
Emirates	Dubai–International
Fly Baghdad	Damascus
flydubai	Dubai–International
Iraqi Airways	Amman–Queen Alia, Baghdad, Beijing–Capital, Beirut, Cairo, Delhi, Dubai–International, Erbil, Istanbul, Mashhad, Muscat, Sulaymaniyah
Nile Air	Cairo
Pegasus Airlines	Istanbul–Sabiha Gökçen
Royal Jordanian	Amman–Queen Alia
Qatar Airways	Doha
Turkish Airlines	Istanbul

== Statistics ==
Year	Passengers		Cargo		Aircraft operations	
Year	Total	%YoY	Tons	%YoY	Movements	%YoY
2015	687,695	N.D.	N.D.	N.D.	7,915	N.D.
2016	716,777	▲4.2%	N.D.	N.D.	9,581	▲21.0%
2017	800,053	▲11.6%	N.D.	N.D.	9,752	▲1.8%
2018	845,351	▲5.7%	3,169.7	N.D.	10,154	▲4.1%
2019	984,985	▲16.5%	3,473.9	▲9.6%	10,107	▼0.5%
2020	198,048	▼79.9%	N.D.	▼100.0%	2,965	▼70.7%
2021	349,677	▲76.6%	1,273.4	N.D.	5,447	▲83.7%
2022	535,082	▲53.0%	4,815.7	▲278.2%	6,871	▲26.1%

Source: COSIT. Air Transport Activity Statistics, years 2015, 2016, 2017, 2018, 2019, 2020, 2021 and 2022.

== See also ==
- List of United Kingdom Military installations used during Operation Telic
- List of United States Military installations in Iraq

== Sources ==
- Pearman, H. (2004). Airports: A Century of Architecture. Laurence King. ISBN 978-1-85669-356-1.
