= Talit railway station =

Railway station in West Bengal, India

Talit
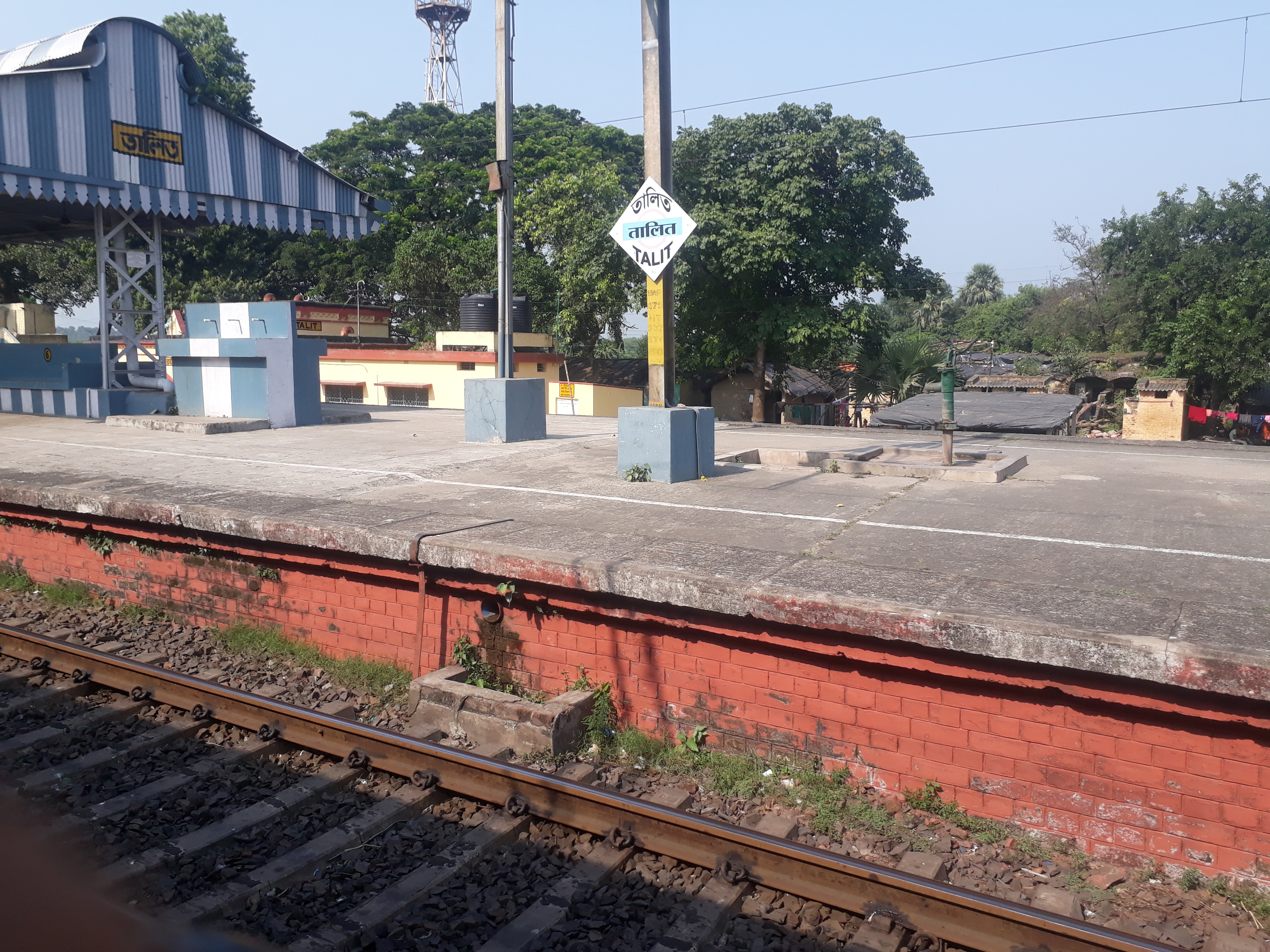
- Talit railway station

General information
- Location: Talit, Bardhaman, West Bengal; India
- Coordinates: 23.2933°N 87.8191°E
- System: Indian Railways station
- Lines: Bardhaman–Asansol section; Bardhaman-Rampurhat section
- Platforms: 4
- Tracks: 4

Construction
- Structure type: Standard (on ground station)

Other information
- Status: Functioning
- Station code: TIT
- Zone(s): Eastern Railway
- Division(s): Howrah

History
- Opened: 1854
- Electrified: 1957–1962
- Former names: East Indian Railway

Services
| Preceding station | Indian Railways | Following station |
|---|---|---|
| Bardhaman towards Barddhaman Junction | Eastern Railway zone Bardhaman–Asansol section | Khana towards Asansol Junction |
Location
- Location within India Location within West Bengal

Talit is a railway station on the Bardhaman–Asansol section & Bardhaman-Rampurhat Section. It is located at Talit near Bardhaman, Purba Bardhaman district in the Indian state of West Bengal. Total 42 trains including 13 passengers trains and few MEMU stops in Talit railway station.

== Culture ==
The famous Bengali author Satyajit Ray mentioned this railway station in his story 'Asamanjababur Kukur'.
