= NH 114 =

NH 114 may refer to:

- National Highway 114 (India)
- New Hampshire Route 114, United States
