= Skylink =

Skylink, SkyLink or Sky Link may refer to:

== Broadcasting and telecommunications ==
- Skylink (TV platform), Czech–Slovak satellite platform
- Sky Link (Russia), LTE-450 operator
- Sky Link TV, Chinese satellite TV station

== Transportation ==
- Skylink (bus service), a British bus service
- Skylink Airways, later known as MAXjet Airways, an American airline
- SkyLink Arabia, a Dubai-based airline
- Delta SkyLinks, online branding once used by Delta Air Lines
- Skylink (Dallas Fort Worth International Airport), an inter-terminal transportation system
- SkyLink (Los Angeles International Airport), future automated people mover system in LAX airport

== See also ==
- Chamberlain Group, Inc. v. Skylink Technologies, Inc., a 2004 American legal case
- Skylink, an earlier name for the Austrian Star Alliance Terminal at Vienna International Airport
- Skylynx (disambiguation)
