= Skylynx =

Skylynx may refer to:

- BAE Systems Skylynx II, an unmanned aerial vehicle
- YVR Skylynx, a Canadian bus operator

== See also ==
- Skylink (disambiguation)
