= Bhedia railway station =

Railway Station in West Bengal

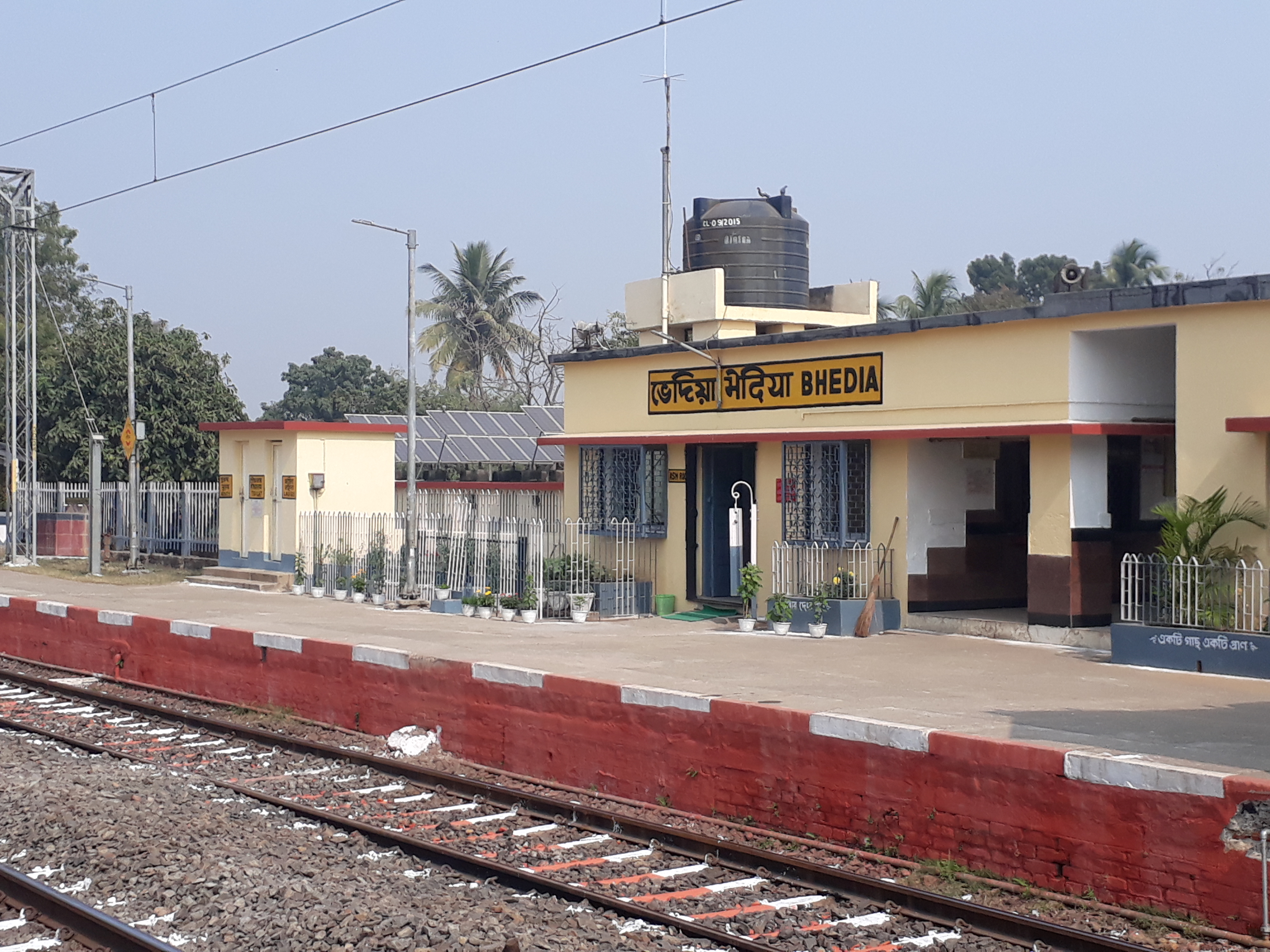

General information
- Location: Bhedia, Purba Bardhaman district, West Bengal; India
- Coordinates: 23.586642°N 87.711813°E
- Elevation: 41 metres (135 ft)
- System: Indian Railways station
- Owner: Indian Railways
- Line: Bardhaman-Rampurhat section
- Platforms: 2
- Tracks: 2

Construction
- Structure type: At grade

Other information
- Status: Double-Line Electrification
- Station code: BDH
- Zone(s): Eastern Railway
- Division(s): Howrah

History
- Opened: 1860

Services
Preceding station	Indian Railways	Following station
Bolpur Shantiniketan towards Kiul Junction	Eastern Railway zone Sahibganj loop	Pichkurir Dhal towards Khana Junction
Location
- Location within West Bengal Location within India

Bhedia railway station is a railway station on the Bardhaman-Rampurhat Section under Howrah railway division of Eastern Railway zone. It is situated beside National Highway 2B at Bhedia in Purba Bardhaman district in the Indian state of West Bengal. Toatal 22 trains stop at Bhedia railway station.
