= Fatehpur, Birbhum =

Fatehpur
- Census Town
- Location in West Bengal Fatehpur (India)
- Coordinates: 24.0846°N 87.7302°E
- Country: India
- State: West Bengal
- District: Birbhum

Area
  - Total: 3.1509 km^{2} (1.2166 sq mi)

Population (2011)
  - Total: 10,176
  - Density: 3,229.6/km^{2} (8,364.5/sq mi)

Languages
  - Official: Bengali, English
- Time zone: IST
- PIN: 731216
- Telephone code: 03461
- Lok Sabha constituency: Bolpur
- Vidhan Sabha constituency: Mayureswar
- Website: birbhum.nic.in

Fatehpur is a census town and a neighbourhood of Mallarpur town in Mayureswar I CD block of Rampurhat subdivision in Birbhum district.

== Geography ==
Cities and towns in Rampurhat subdivision of Birbhum district
M: municipal city/ town, CT: census town, R: rural/ urban centre.
Owing to space constraints in the small map, the actual locations in a larger map may vary slightly

=== Location ===
Fatehpur is located at 24.0846°N 87.7302°E.

=== Overview ===
The northern portion of Rampurhat subdivision (shown in the map alongside) is part of the Nalhati Plains, a sub-micro physiographic region, and the southern portion is part of the Brahmani-Mayurakshi Basin, another sub-micro physiographic region occupying the area between the Brahmani in the north and the Mayurakshi in the south. There is an occasional intrusion of Rajmahal Hills, from adjoining Santhal Parganas, towards the north-western part of the subdivision. On the western side is Santhal Parganas and the border between West Bengal and Jharkhand can be seen in the map. Murshidabad district is on the eastern side. A small portion of the Padma River and the border with Bangladesh (thick line) can be seen in the north-eastern corner of the map. 96.62% of the population of Rampurhat subdivision live the rural areas and 3.38% of the population live in the urban areas.

Note: The map alongside presents some of the notable locations in the area. All places marked in the map are linked in the larger full screen map.

== Demographics ==
As per the 2011 Census of India, Fatehpur had a total population of 10,176 of which 5,193 (51%) were males and 4,983 (49%) were females. Population below 6 years was 1,110. The total number of literates in Fatehpur was 7,292 (80.43% of the population over 6 years).

== Infrastructure ==
As per the District Census Handbook 2011, Fatehpur covered an area of 3.1509 km^{2}. There is a railway station at Fatehpur. Buses are available in the town. It has 2 km roads and open drains. The major source of protected water supply is from bore well pumping. There are 1,961 domestic electric connections and 104 road light points. Amongst the medical facilities it has are 1 hospital with 10 beds, 1 dispensary/ health cente, 1 family welfare centre, 13 medicine shops. Amongst the educational facilities it has are 6 primary schools, 2 middle schools, 2 secondary schools and 2 senior secondary schools. The nearest degree college is at Madian 2.5 km away. There is a public library and a reading room. It has a rice mill and amongst the commodities it produces is mustard oil.

== Transport ==
Fatehpur is on National Highway 14.

== Education ==
Turku Hansda-Lapsa Hemram Mahavidyalaya at Madian is located nearby.

== Culture ==
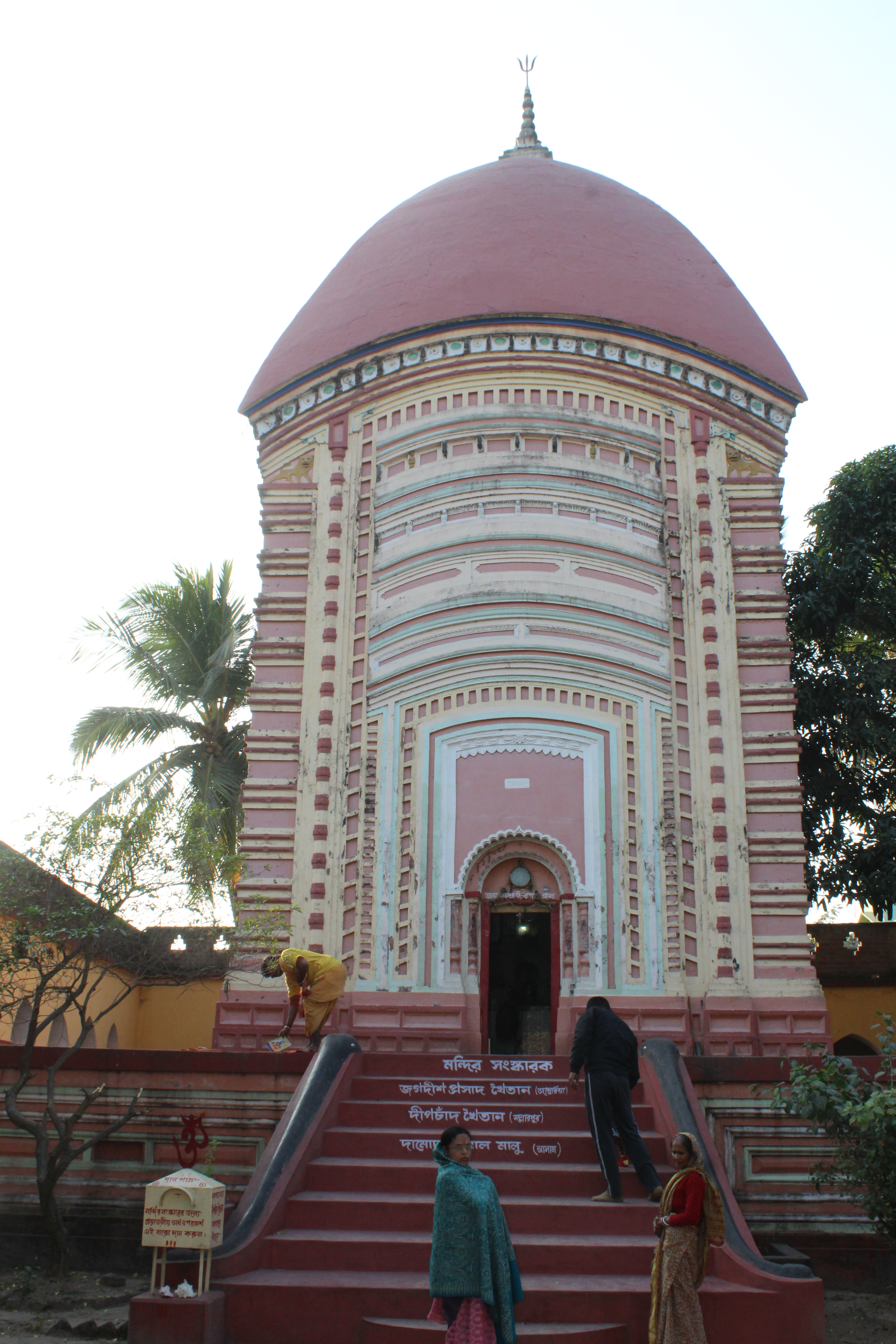
Dabukesvara temple

David J. McCutchion mentions the Dabukesvara temple at Dabuk, located nearby, as a char chala temple with a tall facade, 22 feet^{2} base, largely plain, built around 1881.

== Healthcare ==
Mallarpur Rural Hospital at Mallarpur, located nearby, has 30 beds.
