= SkyLink Arabia =

Skylink Arabia
IATA	ICAO	Call sign
KH	-	-
- Hubs: Dubai International Airport
- Secondary hubs: Kuwait, Iraq, Afghanistan
- Fleet size: 3
- Destinations: 2
- Headquarters: Dubai, United Arab Emirates
- Website: www.skylinkaviation.com

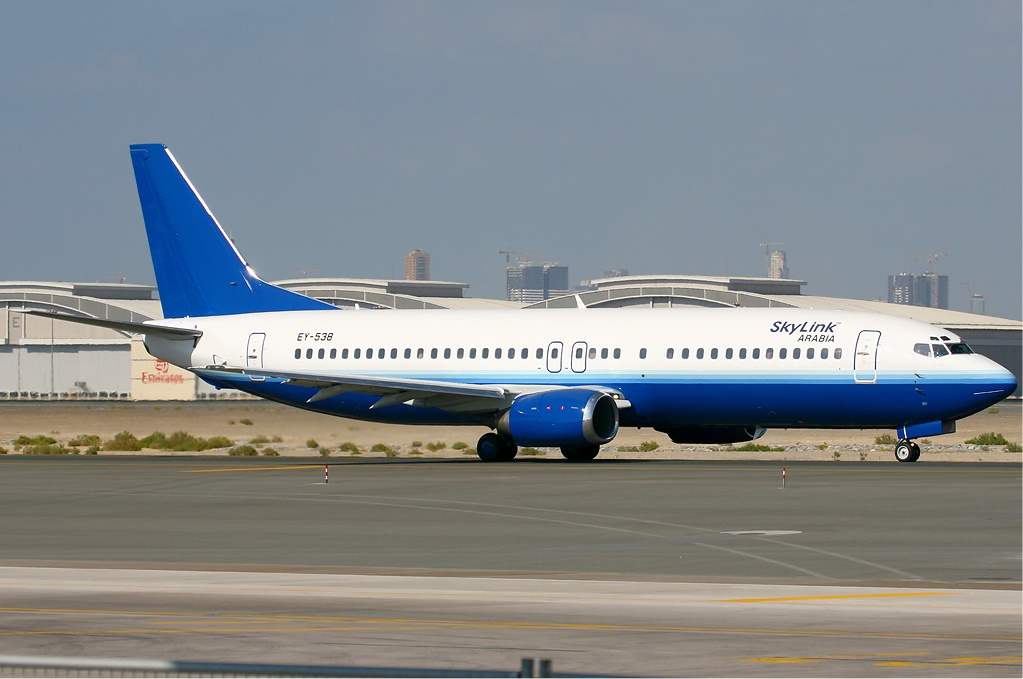
A SkyLink Arabia Boeing 737-400.

Skylink Arabia was a charter airline based in Dubai, United Arab Emirates. Its main base was Dubai International Airport.

== Destinations ==
Skylink operated the following services (as of March 2009):

- Jordan
  - Amman (Queen Alia International Airport)
- United Arab Emirates
  - Dubai (Dubai International Airport)

== Fleet ==
The Sklylink fleet includes the following aircraft (as of November 2010) :

- 1 Boeing 737-300 (which is operated by East Air)
- 1 Fokker F28 Mk4000 (which is operated by AirQuarius Aviation)
- 1 Fokker 70 (which is operated by AirQuarius Aviation)
- 1 Saab 340B (which is operated by Norse Air)
