= YVR Skylynx =

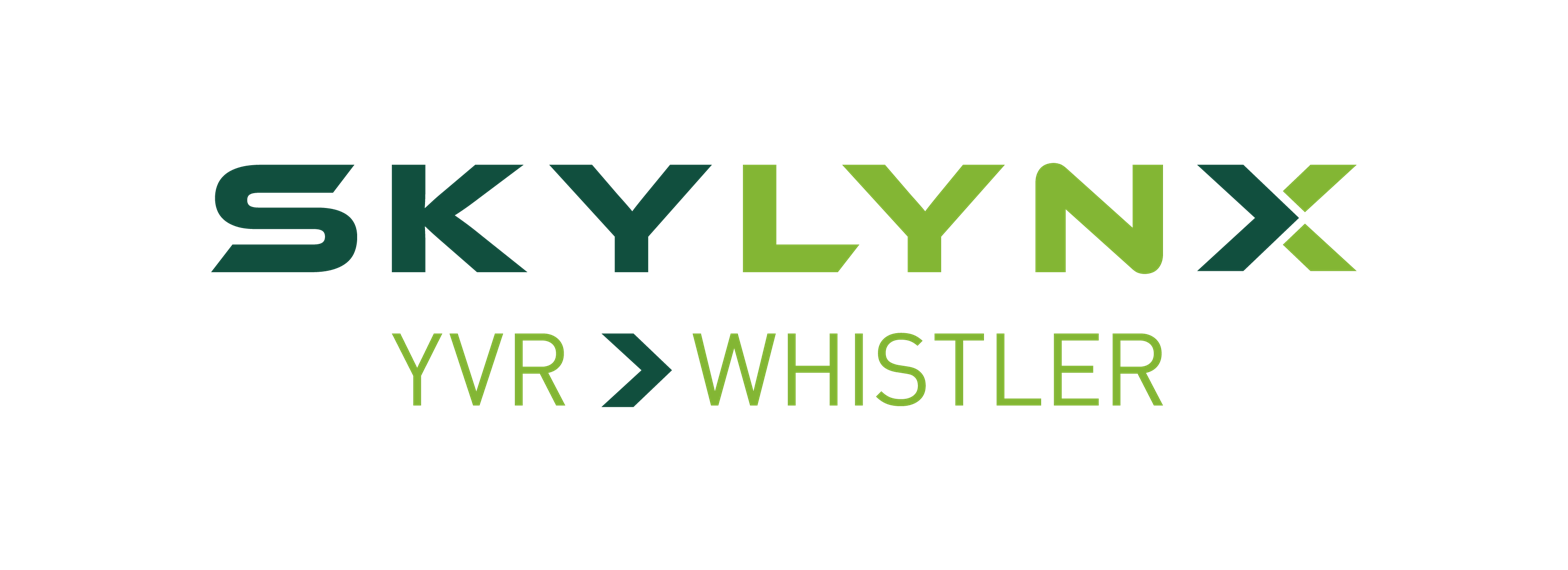
- Headquarters: 11560 Eburne Way, Vancouver, BC
- Service type: Coach bus
- Destinations: Vancouver, Whistler, Squamish
- Stations: Vancouver International Airport
- Fleet: 7
- Website: www.yvrskylynx.com

YVR Skylynx is a bus operator operating in Vancouver, Squamish and Whistler.

== Description ==
As of December 12, 2018, YVR Skylynx runs direct from Vancouver International Airport, Vancouver City Centre to Squamish, Creekside Village and Whistler with their Skylynx coach service. This service was previously operated by Pacific Coach Lines. There are 16 daily departures in winter and up to eight during the summer.

=== Whistler route stops ===
YVR Skylynx serves four stops:

- Vancouver International Airport
- Hyatt Regency Vancouver (near Burrard station)
- Squamish
- Whistler
