= Amba, Birbhum =

Amba
- Village
- Location in West Bengal, India Amba (India)
- Coordinates: 23.983000°N 87.7667000°E
- Country: India
- State: West Bengal
- District: Birbhum

Languages
  - Official: Bengali, English
- Time zone: UTC+5:30 (IST)
- PIN: 731216
- ISO 3166 code: IN-WB
- Lok Sabha constituency: Bolpur
- Vidhan Sabha constituency: Mayureswar
- Website: birbhum.nic.in

Amba is a neighbourhood of Mallarpur town in Rampurhat subdivision of Birbhum district in West Bengal, India. Amba is a ward of Mallarpur and also a mouza.

There is a Vanavasi Kalyan Ashram Hostel near Amba at mollarpur beside Ramkrishna ashram. It is under Mallarpur Police Station.

== Census data ==
At the 2011 Census, Amba village had 339 families and a population of 1430 of which 715 were males while 715 were females In Amba village population of children with age 0-6 was 165 which makes up 11.54% of total population of village. Average Sex Ratio of Amba village was 1000 which is higher than West Bengal state average of 950. Child Sex Ratio for the Amba as per census was 774, lower than West Bengal average of 956. Amba village had a lower literacy rate compared to West Bengal. In 2011, literacy rate of Amba village was 73.20% compared to 76.26% of West Bengal. In Amba Male literacy stands at 82.32% while female literacy rate was 64.39%. As per constitution of India and Panchyati Raaj Act, Amba village is administrated by Sarpanch (Head of Village) who is elected representative of village.
