= Madian, Birbhum =

Madian
- Village
- Location in West Bengal Madian (India)
- Coordinates: 24.0716°N 87.6952°E
- Country: India
- State: West Bengal
- District: Birbhum

Population (2011)
  - Total: 2,595

Languages
  - Official: Bengali, English
- Time zone: IST
- Telephone code: 03462
- Lok Sabha constituency: Bolpur
- Vidhan Sabha constituency: Mayureswar
- Website: birbhum.nic.in

Madian is a village in Mayureswar I CD block in Rampurhat subdivision of Birbhum district.

== Geography ==
Cities and towns in Rampurhat subdivision of Birbhum district
M: municipal city/ town, CT: census town, R: rural/ urban centre.
Owing to space constraints in the small map, the actual locations in a larger map may vary slightly

=== Location ===
Madian is located at 24.0716°N 87.6952°E.

=== Overview ===
The northern portion of Rampurhat subdivision (shown in the map alongside) is part of the Nalhati Plains, a sub-micro physiographic region, and the southern portion is part of the Brahmani-Mayurakshi Basin, another sub-micro physiographic region occupying the area between the Brahmani in the north and the Mayurakshi in the south. There is an occasional intrusion of Rajmahal Hills, from adjoining Santhal Parganas, towards the north-western part of the subdivision. On the western side is Santhal Parganas and the border between West Bengal and Jharkhand can be seen in the map. Murshidabad district is on the eastern side. A small portion of the Padma River and the border with Bangladesh (thick line) can be seen in the north-eastern corner of the map. 96.62% of the population of Rampurhat subdivision live the rural areas and 3.38% of the population live in the urban areas.

Note: The map alongside presents some of the notable locations in the area. All places marked in the map are linked in the larger full screen map.

== Demographics ==
As per the 2011 Census of India, Madian had a total population of 2,626 of which 1,333 (51%) were males and 1,293 (48%) were females. Population below 6 years was 324. The total number of literates in Madian was 1,692 (73.50% of the population over 6 years).

== Transport ==
Madian is on National Highway 14.

== Education ==
Turku Hansda-Lapsa Hemram Mahavidyalaya, a co-educational institution, was established at Madian, near Gonpur in 2006. The college is named after Turku Hansda and Lapsa Hemram, two great tribal leaders of Birbhum. Affiliated to the University of Burdwan, it offers honours courses in Bengali, Santali, English, history, geography and mathematics.
