= Norse Air =

South African airline

IATA	ICAO	Call sign
-	NRX	NORSE AIR
- Founded: 1992
- Hubs: Lanseria International Airport
- Destinations: charter
- Headquarters: Sandton, Gauteng (City of Johannesburg Metropolitan Municipality), South Africa

Norse Air is South African charter airline headquartered in Sandton, Johannesburg and based at Lanseria International Airport.

== History ==
The airline started operations in 1992 and has so far operated within several countries, including South Africa, Mauritius and Afghanistan.

== Destinations ==
Norse Air operates passenger and cargo charter services, as well as aircraft leasing and ACMI charters out of Lanseria Airport, Johannesburg.

== Fleet ==
=== Current fleet ===
The Norse Air fleet consists of the following aircraft:

- 2 Raytheon Beech King Air 200
- 1 Fairchild Metro 23
- 2 Fairchild Metro III

=== Historic fleet ===
- 5 Saab 340B
