= Mallarpur =

- Census Town
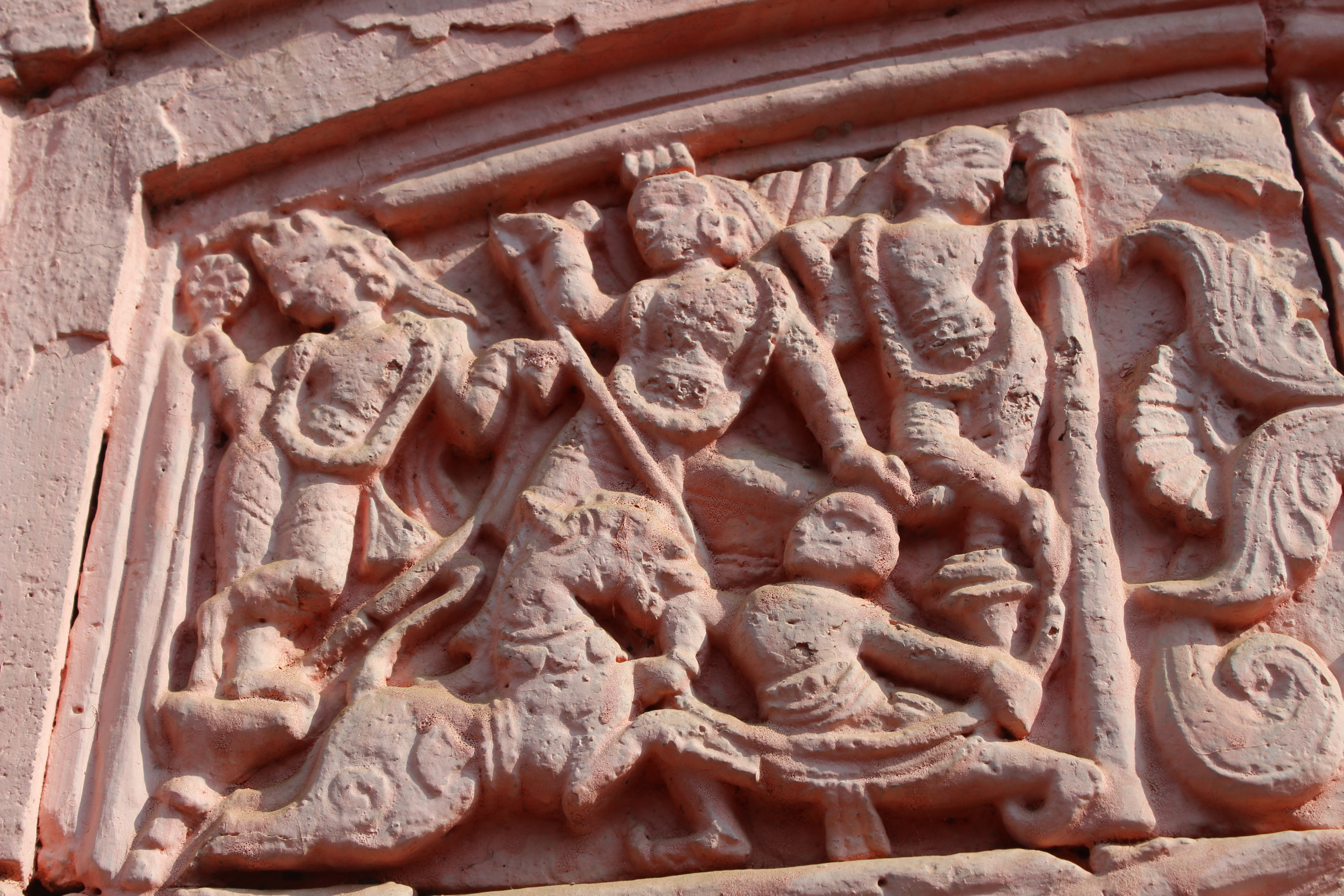
- Terracota carving at Malleswara Temple Complex

- Location in West Bengal, India
- Coordinates: 24.083789°N 87.709934°E
- Country: India
- State: West Bengal
- District: Birbhum

Area
  - Total: 5.30 km^{2} (2.05 sq mi)
- Elevation: 47 m (154 ft)

Population (2011)
  - Total: 6,471
  - Density: 1,220/km^{2} (3,160/sq mi)

Languages
  - Official: Bengali
  - Additional official: English
- Time zone: UTC+5:30 (IST)
- PIN: 731216
- Telephone/STD code: +91 / 03461
- Lok Sabha constituency: Bolpur
- Vidhan Sabha constituency: Mayureswar
- Website: birbhum.nic.in

Mallarpur is a census town in Mayureswar I CD Block in Rampurhat subdivision of Birbhum district in the Indian state of West Bengal.

== Etymology ==
The name Mallarpur had come from Malla kings. Probably, it has some connection with the great Malla king Veer Hambir.

Four separate villages called Amba, Fatehpur, Bahina and Mallarpur merged to form a small town Mallarpur.

== Demographics ==
As per the 2011 Census of India, Mallarpur had a total population of 6,471 of which 3,310 (51%) were males and 3,161 (49%) were females. Population below 6 years was 735. The total number of literates in Mallarpur was 4,584 (79.92% of the population over 6 years).

== Transport ==
Mallarpur is a station on the Sahibganj Loop.

As the Panagarh–Morgram Highway passes through the town the road communication is well developed along with the railway communication. NH 14 (old numbering NH 60) is passing through Mallarpur to District Headquarter Suri via Ganpur, Deucha.

== Culture ==
David J. McCutchion mentions the many small char chala temples of the 18th and 19th centuries built of brick with facades richly carved, at Mallarpur.

== Healthcare ==
Mallarpur Rural Hospital at Mallarpur, with 30 beds, is the main government medical facility in Mayureswar I CD block.

== Gallery ==
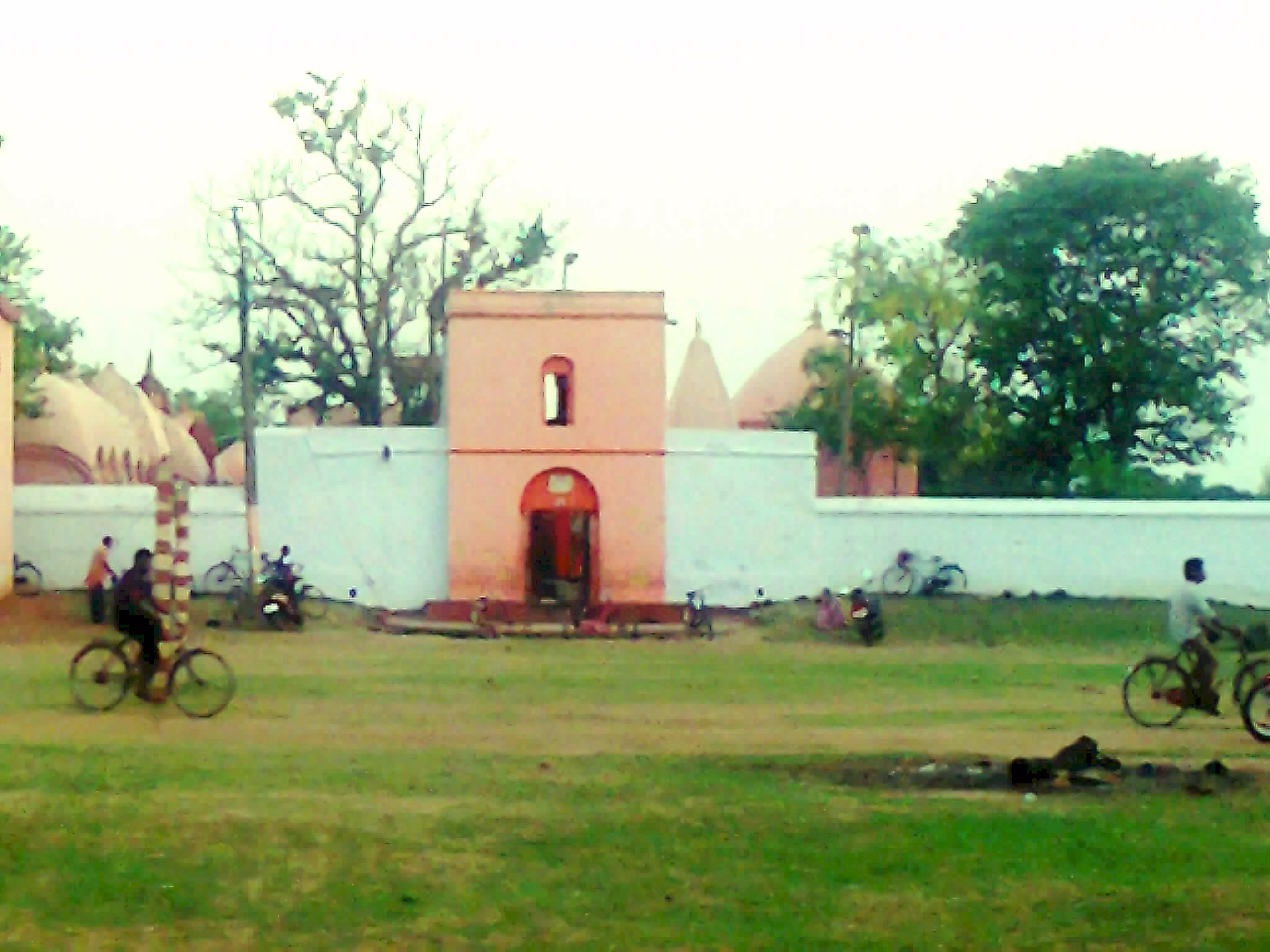
Shiva temple Mallarpur Birbhum

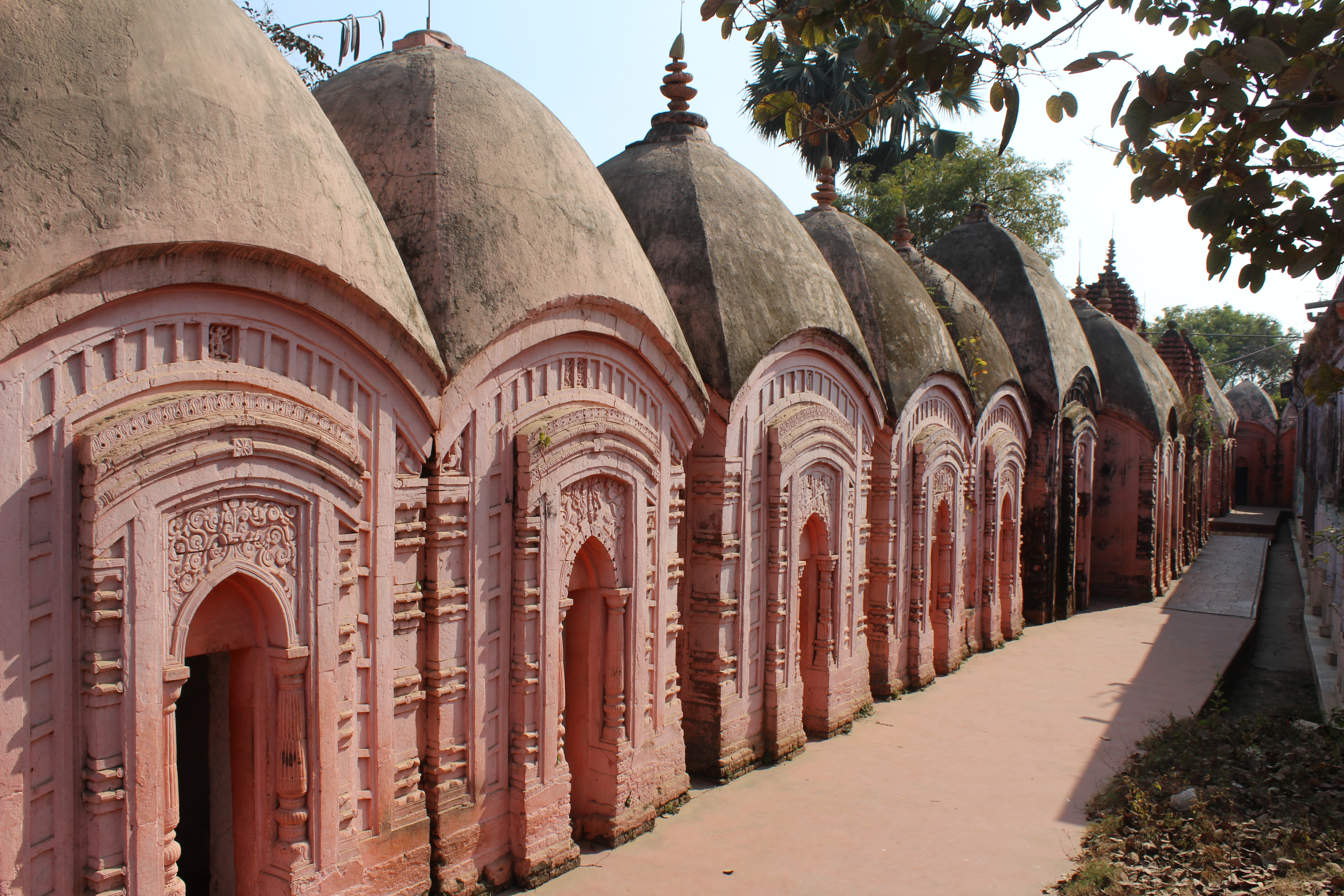
Temple complex of Malleswara at Mallarpur

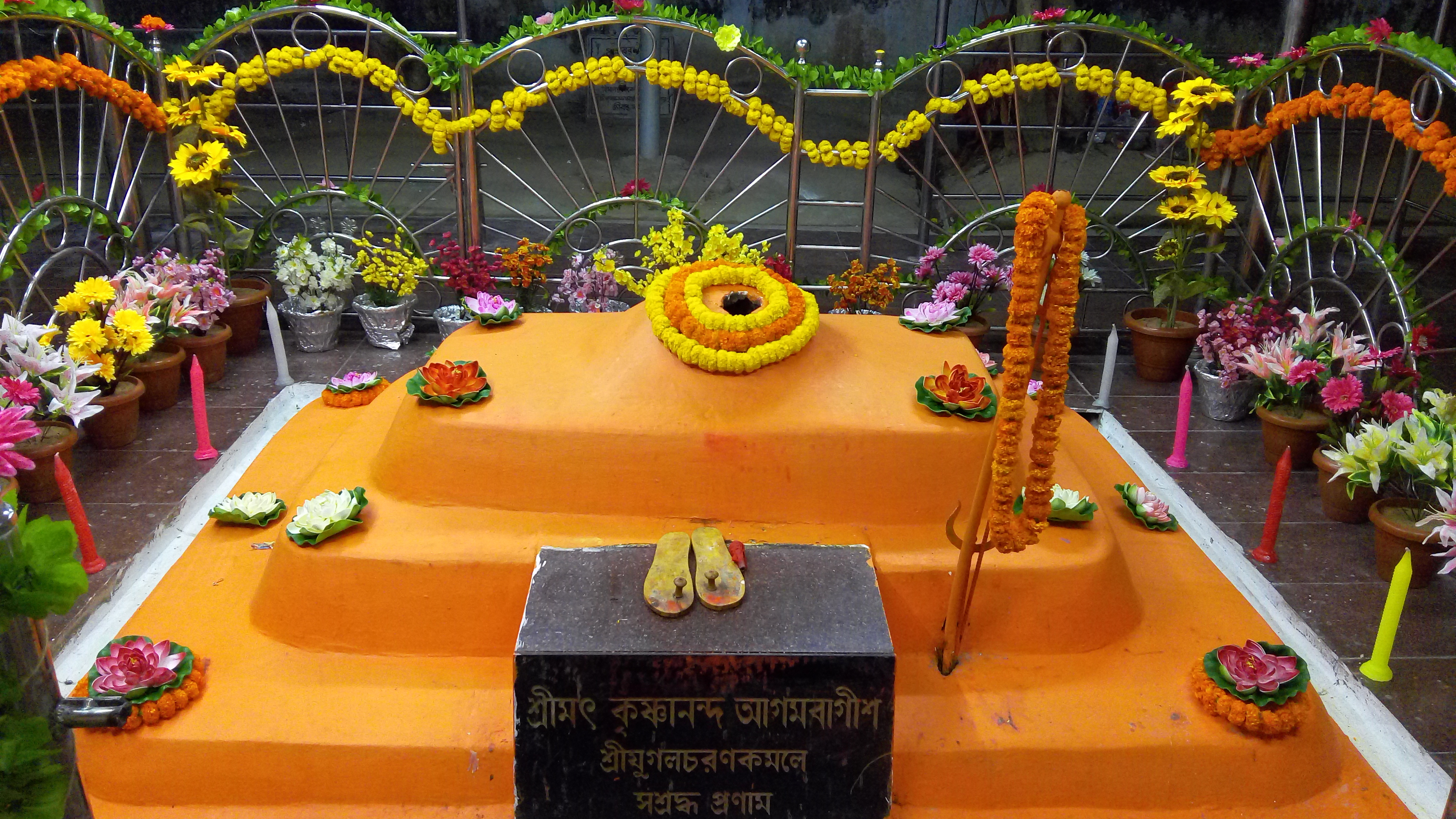
Krishnananda Agamavagisha, guru of Sadhak Ramprasad Sen
