= Khana railway station =

Railway Station in West Bengal, India

Khana Junction
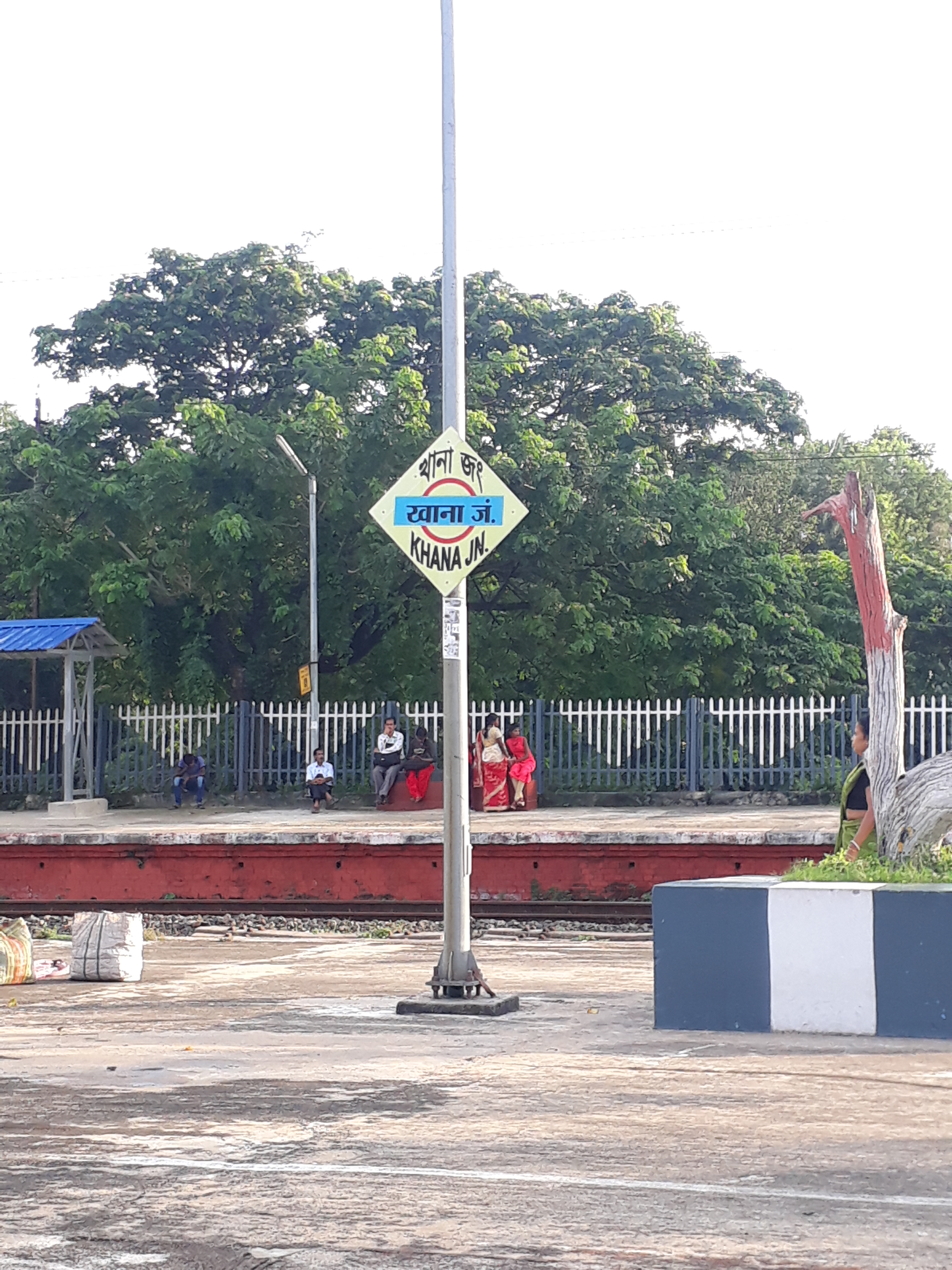
- Khana Jn. railway station

General information
- Location: Khana, Bardhaman, West Bengal; India
- Coordinates: 23°19′15″N 87°46′12″E
- System: Indian Railways
- Lines: Bardhaman–Asansol section; Barddhaman–Rampurhat section
- Platforms: 1,2,3,4,5

Construction
- Structure type: Standard (on-ground station)

Other information
- Status: Functioning
- Station code: KAN
- Zone(s): Eastern Railway
- Division(s): Howrah

History
- Opened: 1854
- Electrified: 1957–1962
- Former names: East Indian Railway
Location
- Location within West Bengal Location within India

Khana Junction is a railway station on the junction point of Bardhaman–Asansol section & Barddhaman–Rampurhat section, which is situated in Bardhaman Sadar North subdivision of Purba Bardhaman district in the Indian state of West Bengal. It is on the Grand Trunk Road and has pincode 713141.

== Ways to reach ==
Khana Junction can be reached through various ways:

- By road, local bus services along Durgapur Expressway has stopage in Kulgoria. It is between Bardhaman and Galsi. Khana Junction is about 2.6 km from Kulgoria Bus Stand on the way towards left turn coming from Galsi to Bardhaman.
- By rail, Khana Junction lies along Bardhaman–Asansol section & Barddhaman–Rampurhat section.

== History ==
During the middle of the nineteenth century, Carr, Tagore and Company transported coal from Narayankuri ghat on the Damodar River to Kolkata, then known as Calcutta. However, as the flow of water in the river was inconsistent, supplies were irregular. In order to capture the lucrative coal transport business, East Indian Railway, extended the railway track that had been laid between Kolkata and Hooghly to Raniganj in 1855.

Construction of what was then considered to be the Howrah–Delhi main line was started in 1859, when the Khana Junction-Rajmahal line was built. In 1866 Kolkata –and Delhi were directly linked. With the completion of the 406 kilometres (252 mi) long line connecting Raniganj with Kiul in 1871, a "shorter main line" was in position. Initially, it was called the chord line. However, as it attracted more traffic it was designated the main line and the original line, operating between Khana Junction and Kiul Junction, became the Sahibganj loop.
