= Barddhaman–Rampurhat section =

Railway route in West Bengal, India

Overview
- Status: Operational
- Owner: Indian Railways
- Locale: West Bengal
- Termini: Barddhaman Junction (south); Rampurhat Junction (north)
- Stations: 17 (excluding termini)

Service
- System: Indian Railways
- Operator: Eastern Railway

History
- Opened: 1866

Technical
- Line length: 112km (69 mi)
- Number of tracks: Bardhaman–Khana (0–13km): 4 track; Khana–Sainthia (13–84km): 2 track; Sainthia–Rampurhat (84–112km): 3 track
- Track gauge: Indian gauge
- Electrification: Fully electrified (2016)
- Operating speed: 110kmph (max)

The Barddhaman–Rampurhat section is a railway line connecting Barddhaman Junction and Rampurhat. This 112 kilometres (69 mi) track is part of the Howrah–New Jalpaiguri line and Sahibganj loop. It is under the jurisdiction of Howrah division of Eastern Railway. Many local, express and superfast trains, along with a huge volume of freight traffic, operate on this route every day.

== History ==
The Khana–Rampurhat section was completed in October 1859, crossing Ajay River on the way. The first train ran from Howrah to Rampurhat via Khana on 4 July 1860. Electrification of the Khana–Rampurhat section was announced in the rail budget for 2010–11. The electrification of Khana–Sainthia–Rampurhat section was completed in 2016. The first electric train service started from 29 September 2016 through running of Sahid Superfast Express by electric locomotive.

== Track ==
For the 71 km Khana–Sainthia section, the final location survey along with the DPR for converting the double line into a triple line has been sanctioned and finalized. The project is targeted for completion by 2028.

For the 28 km Sainthia–Rampurhat section, the final location survey for upgrading the existing triple line to a quadruple line has been sanctioned and finalized. The project is targeted for completion by 2028.

== Speed limit ==
The maximum permissible speed of Khana–Rampurhat is 110 km/h and will be upgraded to 130 km/h under FY 2025–26.To upgrade from 110kmph to 130kmph, several track renewal works are under progress. Among them, 28% of works have already been completed. 53% of works are under construction, and physical progress of these works is 51% on average. 19% of works are yet to be started.

== Stations ==
Talit, Khana, Jhapter Dhal, Banpas, Noadar Dhal, Guskara, Pichkurir Dhal, Bhedia, Bolpur (Shantiniketan), Prantik, Kopai, Ahmadpur, Bataspur, Sainthia, Gadhadharpur, Mallarpur, Tarapith Road.

== Branch routes ==
- Khana–Asansol
- Ahmadpur–Katwa
- Sainthia–Andal
- Rampurhat–Jasidih

== Trains ==
=== Premium train ===
- 22309/10 Howrah–Jamalpur Vande Bharat Express
- 12041/42 Howrah–New Jalpaiguri Shatabdi Express
- 22301/02 Howrah–New Jalpaiguri Vande Bharat Express
- 12503/04 Agartala–SMVT Bengaluru Humsafar Express

=== Long-distance train ===
- 13433/34 Malda Town–SMVT Bengaluru Amrit Bharat Express
- 22503/04 Dibrugarh–Kanniyakumari Vivek Express
- 22511/12 Lokmanya Tilak Terminus–Kamakhya Karmabhoomi Express
- 12507/08 Aronai Express

=== MEMU train ===
- 63581/82, 63583/84, 63011/12, 63068/69 : Rampurhat–Barddhaman MEMU (4 pairs)

== See also ==
- Rampurhat Junction
- Barddhaman Junction
- Sahibganj loop
