= Sadbhavna Express (via Faizabad) =

Overview
- Service type: Express
- First service: 6 September 1997; 29 years ago
- Current operator: Northern Railways

Route
- Termini: Raxaul Junction (RXL); Anand Vihar Terminal (ANVT)
- Stops: 35
- Distance travelled: 1,288 km (800 mi)
- Average journey time: 29h 45m
- Service frequency: Weekly (Note: Runs one day in a week for every direction.)
- Train number: 14017 / 14018

On-board services
- Classes: AC 2 tier, AC 3 tier, Sleeper Class, General Unreserved
- Seating arrangements: Yes
- Sleeping arrangements: Yes
- Catering facilities: On-board catering E-catering
- Baggage facilities: No
- Other facilities: Below the seats

Technical
- Rolling stock: ICF coach
- Track gauge: 1,676 mm (5 ft 6 in)
- Operating speed: 44 km/h (27 mph) average including halts

The 14017 / 14018 Sadbhavna Express is an express train belonging to Northern Railway zone that runs between Raxaul Junction and Delhi Sarai Rohilla via Ayodhya Junction in India. It is currently being operated with 14017/14018 train numbers on a weekly basis.

== Service ==
The 14017/Sadbhavna Express has an average speed of 44 km/h and covers 1299 km in 29h 45m. The 14018/Sadbhavana Express has an average speed of 42 km/h and covers 1299 km in 30h 40m.

== Route and halts ==
The important halts of the train are:

- Raxaul Junction
- Sitamarhi Junction
- Muzaffarpur Junction
- Hajipur Junction
- Chhapra Junction
- Ballia
- Ghazipur City
- Varanasi Junction
- Jaunpur Junction
- Ayodhya Junction
- Barabanki Junction
- Lucknow Charbagh
- Alamnagar
- Hardoi
- Chandausi
- Moradabad Junction
- Amroha
- Hapur Junction
- Ghaziabad Junction
- Anand Vihar Terminal

== Coach composition ==
The train has standard ICF rakes with max speed of 110 km/h. The train consists of 20 coaches:

- 2 AC III Tier
- 9 Sleeper Coaches
- 7 General
- 2 Seating cum Luggage Rake

== Traction ==
Both trains are hauled by a Tughlakabad-based WDM-3A or WDP-4D diesel locomotive from Raxaul to Delhi and vice versa.

== Rake sharing ==
The train shares its rake with 14013/14014 Sultanpur–Anand Vihar Sadbhavana Express.

== See also ==
- Raxaul Junction railway station
- Delhi Junction railway station
- Sadbhawna Express (via Sagauli)
- Sadbhavna Express (via Sitamarhi)
