= Sadbhavna Express =

Indian Railways express train

Overview
- Service type: Express
- First service: 3 July 1994; 32 years ago
- Current operator: Northern Railways

Route
- Termini: Raxaul Junction (RXL); Anand Vihar Terminal (ANVT)
- Stops: 32
- Distance travelled: 1,258 km (782 mi)
- Average journey time: 29h 45m
- Service frequency: Bi-Weekly (Note: Runs twice weekly in each direction.)
- Train number: 14007 / 14008

On-board services
- Classes: AC 2 tier, AC 3 tier, Sleeper class, General Unreserved
- Seating arrangements: Yes
- Sleeping arrangements: Yes
- Catering facilities: On-board catering E-catering
- Baggage facilities: No
- Other facilities: Below the seats

Technical
- Rolling stock: ICF coach
- Track gauge: 1,676 mm (5 ft 6 in)
- Operating speed: 42 km/h (26 mph) average including halts

The Sadbhavna Express is an express train of Indian Railways that runs between Raxaul in Bihar and Anand Vihar in Delhi. It is operated by the Northern Railway zone and connects major towns and cities of Bihar and UP with the National Capital. The train operates under three sets of train numbers: 14007/14008, 14016/17, 14017/14018 each following a different route.

== Sadhbhavna Express (via Ayodhya and Sitamarhi) ==
=== Schedule ===
14016 / 14017 Anand Vihar Terminal–Raxaul Sadhbhawna Express Schedule
Train Type	Express
Distance	~1060 km (14016) / ~1060 km (14017)
Average Speed	~36 km/h
Journey Time (ANVT → RXL)	~29 hrs 40 min
Journey Time (RXL → ANVT)	~29 hrs 00 min
Classes Available	2A, 3A, Sleeper (SL), General
Operating Days	Weekly
Operator	East Central Railway

=== Route and Halts ===
14016 / 14017 Anand Vihar Terminal–Raxaul Sadhbhawna Express
Sr.	14016 ANVT–RXL				14017 RXL–ANVT			
Sr.	Station	Day	Arr.	Dep.	Station	Day	Arr.	Dep.
1	Anand Vihar Terminal	1	—	16:30	Raxaul Junction	1	—	23:45
2	Ghaziabad Junction	1	17:04	17:06	Ghorasahan	2	00:16	00:18
3	Pilkhuwa	1	17:32	17:34	Bairagnia	2	00:38	00:40
4	Hapur	1	17:45	17:47	Sitamarhi	2	01:25	01:30
5	Amroha	1	18:42	18:44	Runnisaidpur	2	01:52	01:54
6	Moradabad Junction	1	19:35	19:45	Muzaffarpur Junction	2	03:15	03:45
7	Chandausi Junction	1	20:41	20:46	Hajipur Junction	2	04:40	04:45
8	Aonla	1	21:17	21:19	Sonpur Junction	2	04:53	04:55
9	Shahjahanpur Junction	1	23:21	23:23	Dighwara	2	05:19	05:21
10	Hardoi	2	00:11	00:13	Chhapra Junction	2	06:25	06:35
11	Alamnagar	2	01:50	01:51	Suraimanpur	2	07:08	07:10
12	Lucknow Junction	2	02:15	02:25	Ballia	2	07:50	07:55
13	Nihalgarh	2	04:19	04:21	Yusufpur	2	08:35	08:37
14	Musafir Khana	2	04:58	05:00	Ghazipur City	2	09:00	09:05
15	Sultanpur Junction	2	05:36	05:38	Aunrihar Junction	2	09:53	09:55
16	Lambhua	2	06:03	06:04	Varanasi City	2	11:10	11:15
17	Shrikrishna Nagar	2	06:29	06:30	Varanasi Junction	2	11:35	11:45
18	Jaunpur City	2	06:56	06:58	Jaunpur Junction	2	12:46	12:48
19	Varanasi Junction	2	09:00	09:10	Shahganj Junction	2	13:26	13:28
20	Varanasi City	2	09:25	09:30	Akbarpur	2	14:11	14:15
21	Kadipur	2	09:50	09:52	Goshainganj	2	14:39	14:41
22	Aunrihar Junction	2	10:08	10:10	Ayodhya Dham Junction	2	15:08	15:10
23	Ghazipur City	2	10:50	10:55	Ayodhya Cantt	2	15:35	15:40
24	Yusufpur	2	11:13	11:15	Rudauli	2	16:16	16:17
25	Ballia	2	11:50	11:55	Barabanki Junction	2	17:27	17:28
26	Suraimanpur	2	12:33	12:35	Lucknow Junction	2	18:05	18:15
27	Chhapra Junction	2	14:10	14:20	Alamnagar	2	18:45	18:46
28	Dighwara	2	15:03	15:05	Hardoi	2	19:56	19:58
29	Sonpur Junction	2	15:29	15:31	Shahjahanpur Junction	2	21:08	21:10
30	Hajipur Junction	2	15:43	15:48	Aonla	2	23:01	23:03
31	Muzaffarpur Junction	2	17:50	18:15	Chandausi Junction	2	23:45	23:50
32	Motipur	2	18:50	18:52	Moradabad Junction	3	01:17	01:27
33	Mehsi	2	19:04	19:06	Amroha	3	01:56	01:58
34	Chakia	2	19:16	19:18	Hapur	3	03:02	03:07
35	Bapudham Motihari	2	19:41	19:44	Pilkhuwa	3	03:16	03:18
36	Sagauli Junction	2	20:10	20:30	Ghaziabad Junction	3	04:10	04:12
37	Raxaul Junction	2	22:10	—	Anand Vihar Terminal	3	04:45	—

=== Coach Composition ===
Category	Coaches	Total
End-on-Generator / Luggage Parcel Van	LPR, LPR	2
General Second Class	GEN, GEN, GEN, GEN	4
Sleeper Class (SL)	S1, S2, S3, S4, S5, S6	6
Pantry Car	PC	1
AC 3 Tier (3A)	B1, B2, B3, B4	4
AC 3 Tier Economy (3E)	M1, M2	2
AC 2 Tier (2A)	A1, A2	2
AC First Class (1A)	H1	1
SLRD (Divyangjan)	SLRD	1
Total Coaches		22

== Sadhbhavna Express (via Sultanpur and Motihari) ==
The Sadbhavna Express (via Sultanpur and Motihari) operates as a weekly service (14015/14016 or 14017/14018) connecting Raxaul Junction (RXL) in Bihar to Anand Vihar Terminal (ANVT) in Delhi. Key stops include Sagauli, Bapudham Motihari, Muzaffarpur, Sultanpur, Lucknow, and Moradabad, covering a total distance of approximately 1,229 km in about 29-30 hours.

=== Schedule ===
14015 / 14016 Raxaul–Anand Vihar Terminal Sadhbhawna Express
Train Type	Express
Distance	1226 km (14015) / 1226 km (14016)
Average Speed	~35–36 km/h
Journey Time (RXL → ANVT)	~29 hrs 50 min
Journey Time (ANVT → RXL)	~29 hrs 40 min
Total Stops	35+
Classes Available	2A, 3A, Sleeper (SL), General
Operating Days	Weekly
Operator	East Central Railway

=== Route and Halts ===
14015 / 14016Raxaul–Anand Vihar Terminal Sadhbhawna Express
Sr.	14015 RXL–ANVT				14016 ANVT–RXL			
Sr.	Station	Day	Arr.	Dep.	Station	Day	Arr.	Dep.
1	Raxaul Junction	1	—	22:55	Anand Vihar Terminal	1	—	16:30
2	Sagauli Junction	1	23:30	23:55	Ghaziabad Junction	1	17:04	17:06
3	Bapudham Motihari	2	00:12	00:15	Pilkhuwa	1	17:32	17:34
4	Chakia	2	00:48	00:50	Hapur	1	17:45	17:47
5	Mehsi	2	01:00	01:02	Amroha	1	18:42	18:44
6	Motipur	2	01:38	01:40	Moradabad Junction	1	19:35	19:45
7	Muzaffarpur Junction	2	03:20	03:50	Chandausi Junction	1	20:41	20:46
8	Hajipur Junction	2	04:40	04:45	Aonla	1	21:17	21:19
9	Sonpur Junction	2	04:53	04:55	Shahjahanpur Junction	1	23:21	23:23
10	Dighwara	2	05:19	05:21	Hardoi	2	00:11	00:13
11	Chhapra Junction	2	06:25	06:35	Alamnagar	2	01:50	01:51
12	Suraimanpur	2	07:08	07:10	Lucknow Junction	2	02:15	02:25
13	Ballia	2	07:50	07:55	Nihalgarh	2	04:19	04:21
14	Yusufpur	2	08:35	08:37	Musafir Khana	2	04:58	05:00
15	Ghazipur City	2	09:00	09:05	Sultanpur Junction	2	05:36	05:38
16	Aunrihar Junction	2	09:53	09:55	Lambhua	2	06:03	06:04
17	Kadipur	2	10:35	10:37	Shrikrishna Nagar	2	06:29	06:30
18	Varanasi City	2	11:10	11:15	Jaunpur City	2	06:56	06:58
19	Varanasi Junction	2	11:35	11:45	Varanasi Junction	2	09:00	09:10
20	Jaunpur City	2	12:44	12:46	Varanasi City	2	09:25	09:30
21	Shrikrishna Nagar	2	13:13	13:14	Kadipur	2	09:50	09:52
22	Lambhua	2	13:48	13:49	Aunrihar Junction	2	10:08	10:10
23	Sultanpur Junction	2	15:15	15:30	Ghazipur City	2	10:50	10:55
24	Musafir Khana	2	15:54	15:56	Yusufpur	2	11:13	11:15
25	Nihalgarh	2	16:12	16:14	Ballia	2	11:50	11:55
26	Lucknow Junction	2	18:05	18:15	Suraimanpur	2	12:33	12:35
27	Alamnagar	2	18:45	18:46	Chhapra Junction	2	14:10	14:20
28	Hardoi	2	19:56	19:58	Dighwara	2	15:03	15:05
29	Shahjahanpur Junction	2	21:08	21:10	Sonpur Junction	2	15:29	15:31
30	Aonla	2	23:01	23:03	Hajipur Junction	2	15:43	15:48
31	Chandausi Junction	2	23:45	23:50	Muzaffarpur Junction	2	17:50	18:15
32	Moradabad Junction	3	01:17	01:27	Motipur	2	18:50	18:52
33	Amroha	3	01:56	01:58	Mehsi	2	19:04	19:06
34	Hapur	3	03:02	03:07	Chakia	2	19:16	19:18
35	Pilkhuwa	3	03:16	03:18	Bapudham Motihari	2	19:41	19:44
36	Ghaziabad Junction	3	04:10	04:12	Sagauli Junction	2	20:10	20:30
37	Anand Vihar Terminal	3	04:45	—	Raxaul Junction	2	22:10	—

=== Coach Composition ===
Category	Coaches	Total
End-on-Generator / Luggage Parcel Van	LPR, LPR	2
General Second Class	GEN, GEN, GEN, GEN	4
Sleeper Class (SL)	S1, S2, S3, S4, S5, S6	6
Pantry Car	PC	1
AC 3 Tier (3A)	B1, B2, B3, B4	4
AC 3 Tier Economy (3E)	M1, M2	2
AC 2 Tier (2A)	A1, A2	2
AC First Class (1A)	H1	1
SLRD (Divyangjan)	SLRD	1
Total Coaches		22

== Sadhbhavna Express (via Sultanpur and Sitamarhi) ==
The 14007/14008 Sadbhavna Express is a weekly Mail/Express train connecting Raxaul Junction (RXL) in Bihar with Anand Vihar Terminal (ANVT) in Delhi.

=== Schedule ===
14007 / 14008 Raxaul–Anand Vihar Sadhbhavana Express Schedule
Train Type	Express
Distance	1246 km (14007) / 1246 km (14008)
Average Speed	36 km/h
Journey Time (Raxaul → Anand Vihar)	29 hrs 00 min
Journey Time (Anand Vihar → Raxaul)	29 hrs 35 min
Classes Available	2A, 3A, Sleeper (SL), General
Operating Days	Bi - Weekly
Operator	East Central Railway

=== Route and Halts ===
14007 / 14008 Raxaul–Anand Vihar Sadhbhavana Express Schedule
Sr.	14007 RXL–ANVT				14008 ANVT–RXL			
Sr.	Station	Day	Arr.	Dep.	Station	Day	Arr.	Dep.
1	Raxaul Junction	1	—	23:45	Anand Vihar Terminal	1	—	16:30
2	Ghorasahan	2	00:16	00:18	Ghaziabad Junction	1	17:04	17:06
3	Bairagnia	2	00:38	00:40	Pilkhuwa	1	17:32	17:34
4	Sitamarhi	2	01:25	01:30	Hapur	1	17:45	17:47
5	Runnisaidpur	2	01:52	01:54	Amroha	1	18:42	18:44
6	Muzaffarpur Junction	2	03:15	03:45	Moradabad Junction	1	19:35	19:45
7	Hajipur Junction	2	04:40	04:45	Raja Ka Sahaspur	1	20:09	20:11
8	Sonpur Junction	2	04:53	04:55	Chandausi Junction	1	20:41	20:46
9	Dighwara	2	05:19	05:21	Aonla	1	21:17	21:19
10	Chhapra Junction	2	06:25	06:35	Shahjahanpur Junction	1	23:21	23:23
11	Suraimanpur	2	07:08	07:10	Hardoi	2	00:11	00:13
12	Ballia	2	07:50	07:55	Alamnagar	2	01:50	01:51
13	Yusufpur	2	08:35	08:37	Lucknow Junction	2	02:15	02:25
14	Ghazipur City	2	09:00	09:05	Nihalgarh	2	04:19	04:21
15	Aunrihar Junction	2	09:53	09:55	Musafir Khana	2	04:58	05:00
16	Kadipur	2	10:35	10:37	Sultanpur Junction	2	05:36	05:38
17	Varanasi City	2	11:10	11:15	Lambhua	2	06:03	06:04
18	Varanasi Junction	2	11:35	11:45	Shrikrishna Nagar	2	06:29	06:30
19	Jaunpur City	2	12:44	12:46	Jaunpur City	2	06:56	06:58
20	Shrikrishna Nagar	2	13:13	13:14	Varanasi Junction	2	09:00	09:10
21	Lambhua	2	13:48	13:49	Varanasi City	2	09:25	09:30
22	Sultanpur Junction	2	15:15	15:30	Kadipur	2	09:50	09:52
23	Musafir Khana	2	15:55	15:56	Aunrihar Junction	2	10:08	10:10
24	Nihalgarh	2	16:13	16:14	Ghazipur City	2	10:50	10:55
25	Lucknow Junction	2	18:05	18:15	Yusufpur	2	11:13	11:15
26	Alamnagar	2	18:45	18:46	Ballia	2	11:55	12:00
27	Hardoi	2	19:56	19:58	Suraimanpur	2	12:33	12:35
28	Shahjahanpur Junction	2	21:08	21:10	Chhapra Junction	2	14:10	14:20
29	Aonla	2	23:01	23:03	Dighwara	2	15:03	15:05
30	Chandausi Junction	2	23:45	23:50	Sonpur Junction	2	15:29	15:31
31	Raja Ka Sahaspur	3	00:14	00:16	Hajipur Junction	2	15:43	15:48
32	Moradabad Junction	3	01:17	01:27	Muzaffarpur Junction	2	17:50	18:15
33	Amroha	3	01:56	01:58	Runnisaidpur	2	19:03	19:05
34	Hapur	3	03:02	03:07	Sitamarhi	2	19:31	19:36
35	Pilkhuwa	3	03:16	03:18	Bairagnia	2	20:01	20:03
36	Ghaziabad Junction	3	04:10	04:12	Ghorasahan	2	20:26	20:28
37	Anand Vihar Terminal	3	04:45	—	Raxaul Junction	2	22:05	—

=== Coach Composition ===
Category	Coaches	Total
End-on-Generator / Luggage Parcel Van	LPR, LPR	2
General Second Class	GEN, GEN, GEN, GEN	4
Sleeper Class (SL)	S1, S2, S3, S4, S5, S6	6
Pantry Car	PC	1
AC 3 Tier (3A)	B1, B2, B3, B4	4
AC 3 Tier Economy (3E)	M1, M2	2
AC 2 Tier (2A)	A1, A2	2
AC First Class (1A)	H1	1
SLRD (Divyangjan)	SLRD	1
Total Coaches		22

The train was in news in December 2022, when the contractor was fined Rs.1 lakh.

== See also ==
- Sapt Kranti Express
- Satyagrah Express
- Sitamarhi–Delhi Junction Amrit Bharat Express
- Lichchavi Express
