= Madar (Ajmer)–Darbhanga Amrit Bharat Express =

Amrit Bharat Express train route in India

Madar (Ajmer) – Darbhanga Amrit Bharat Express
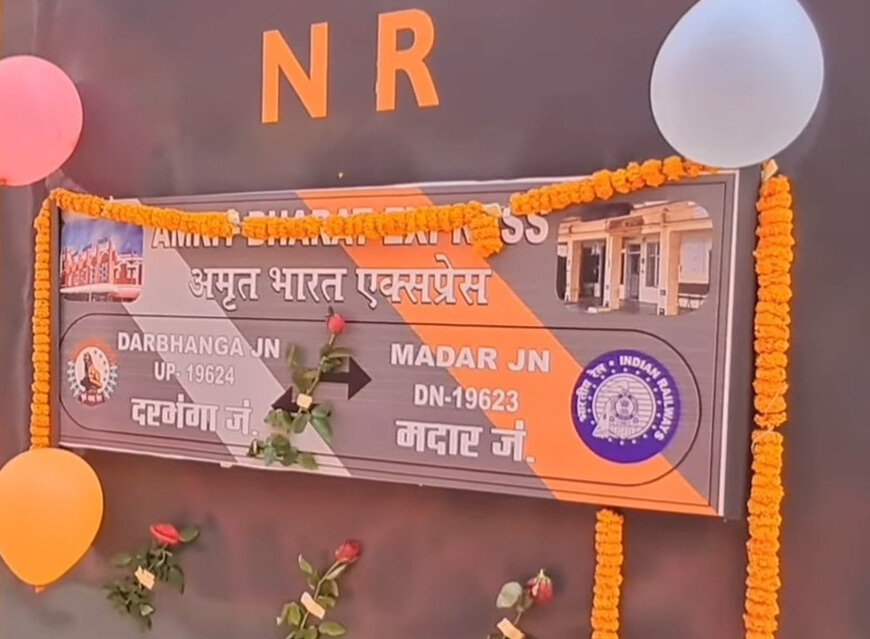

Overview
- Service type: Amrit Bharat Express, Superfast
- Status: Active
- Locale: Rajasthan, Uttar Pradesh & Bihar
- First service: 29 September 2025; 7 months ago (Inaugural) 5 October 2025; 7 months ago (Commercial)
- Current operator: East Central Railways (ECR)

Route
- Termini: Madar Junction (MDJN); Darbhanga Junction (DBG)
- Stops: 30
- Distance travelled: 1,305 km (811 mi)
- Average journey time: 27h 30m
- Service frequency: Weekly
- Train number: 19623 / 19624
- Lines used: Madar–Jaipur line; Bandikui–Bharatpur line; Tundla–Kanpur line; Unnao–Barabanki line; Gonda–Gorakhpur line; Kaptanganj–Narkatiaganj–Raxaul line; Sitamarhi–Darbhanga line

On-board services
- Class: Sleeper class (SL) General Unreserved (GS)
- Seating arrangements: Yes
- Sleeping arrangements: Yes
- Auto-rack arrangements: Upper
- Catering facilities: On-board catering
- Observation facilities: Saffron-grey
- Entertainment facilities: Electric outlets; Reading lights; Bottle holder
- Other facilities: CCTV cameras; Bio-vacuum toilets; Foot-operated water taps; Passenger information system

Technical
- Rolling stock: Modified LHB coach
- Track gauge: Indian gauge
- Electrification: 25 kV 50 Hz AC Overhead line
- Operating speed: 47 km (29 mi) (Avg.)
- Track owner: Indian Railways
- Rake sharing: No

The 19623/19624 Madar (Ajmer)–Darbhanga Amrit Bharat Express is India's 14th Non-AC Superfast Amrit Bharat Express train, which runs across the states of Rajasthan, Uttar Pradesh & Bihar by connecting Madar (Ajmer) and Darbhanga via Jaipur Junction, Kanpur Central, Lucknow Junction, Gorakhpur Junction & Sitamarhi Junction.

The train will inaugurate on 29 September 2025 by Prime Minister Narendra Modi via video conference from New Delhi, India.

== Overview ==
The train is operated by Indian Railways, connecting Madar (Ajmer Junction) and Darbhanga Junction. It is currently operated with train numbers 19623/19624 on weekly basis.

== Rakes ==
It is the 14th Amrit Bharat 2.0 Express train in which the locomotives were designed by Chittaranjan Locomotive Works (CLW) at Chittaranjan, West Bengal and the coaches were designed and manufactured by the Integral Coach Factory at Perambur, Chennai under the Make in India initiative.

== Services ==
The 19623/19624 Madar (Ajmer) – Darbhanga Junction Amrit Bharat Express currently operates 1 day in a week, covering a distance of 1305 km (810 mi) in a travel time of 27 hrs 30 mins with an average speed of 47 km/h (29.2 mph). The Maximum Permissible Speed (MPS) is 130 km/h (81 mph).

== Routes & halts ==
The halts for this 19623/19624 Madar Junction (Ajmer) – Darbhanga Junction Amrit Bharat Express are as follows:-

1. Madar Junction
2. Kishangarh
3. Jaipur Junction
4. Gandhinagar Jaipur
5. Bandikui Junction
6. Mandawar Mahwa Road
7. Bharatpur Junction
8. Idgah
9. Tundla Junction
10. Etawah Junction
11. Phaphund
12. Kanpur Central
13. Unnao Junction
14. Aishbagh
15. Badshahnagar
16. Gomti Nagar
17. Barabanki Junction
18. Gonda Junction
19. Mankapur Junction
20. Basti
21. Gorakhpur Junction
22. Kaptanganj Junction
23. Siswa Bazar
24. Bagaha
25. Narkatiaganj Junction
26. Sikta
27. Raxaul Junction
28. Bairgania
29. Sitamarhi Junction
30. Janakpur Road
31. Kamtaul
32. Darbhanga Junction

== See also ==
- Amrit Bharat Express
- Vande Bharat Express
- Rajdhani Express
- Madar Junction
- Darbhanga Junction railway station
