= Raxaul =

- Town
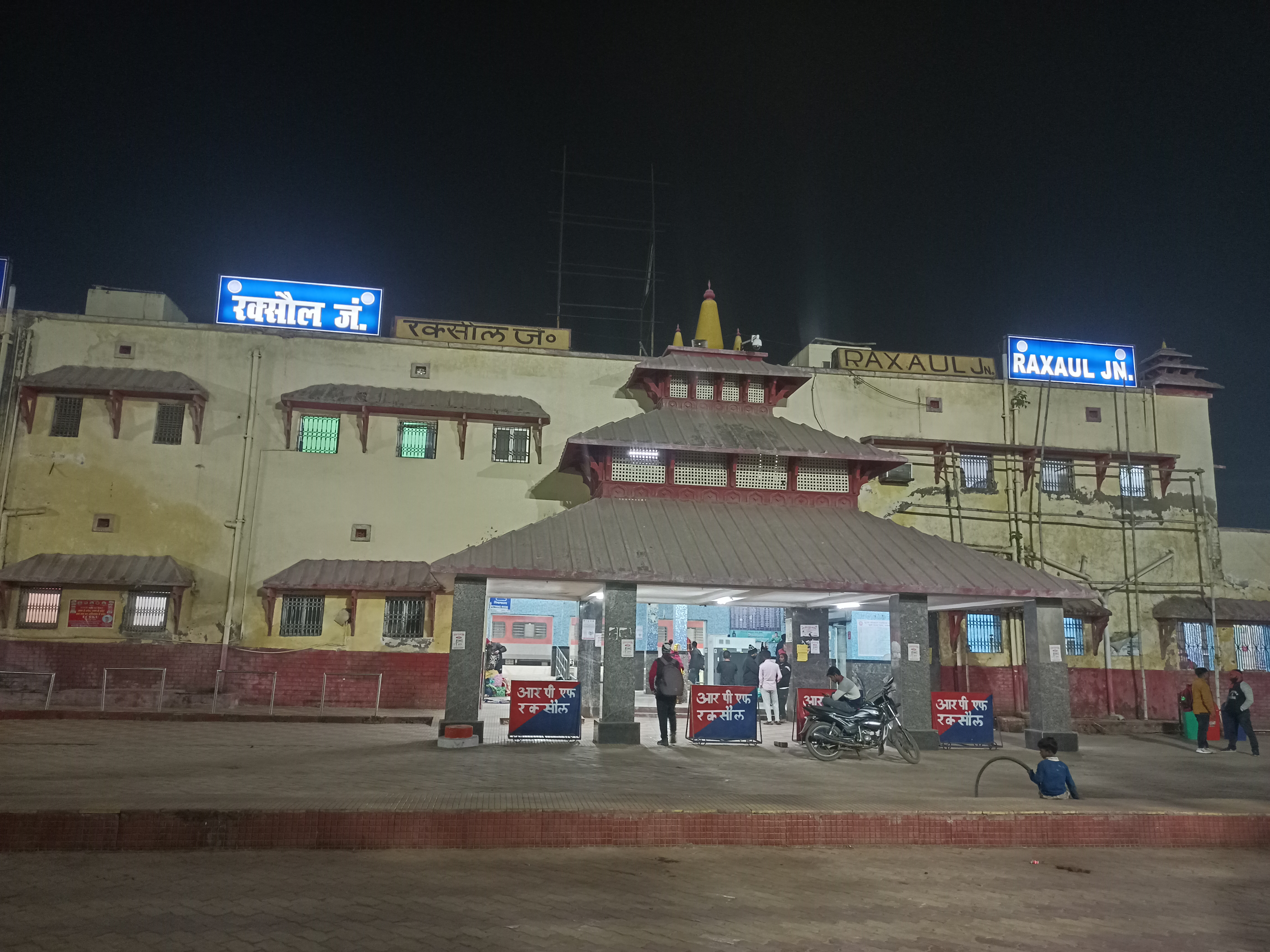
- Raxaul Junction railway station

- Location in Bihar, India Raxaul (India)
- Coordinates: 26.9833°N 84.8500°E
- Country: India
- State: Bihar
- District: Purbi Champaran

Government
  - Type: Nagar Parishad
  - Body: Raxaul Nagar Parishad

Area
  - Total: 5 km^{2} (1.9 sq mi)
- Elevation: 68 m (223 ft)

Population (2024)
  - Total: 125,210 almost (Raxaul Nagar Parishad)
  - Density: 25,000/km^{2} (65,000/sq mi)
- Demonym: Raxaulbashi

Languages
  - Official: Hindi, Bhojpuri
- Time zone: UTC+5:30 (IST)
- PIN: 845305
- Telephone code: 06255
- ISO 3166 code: IN-BR
- Vehicle registration: BR-05
- Lok Sabha constituency: Purvi Champaran Lok Sabha constituency
- Vidhan Sabha constituency: Raxaul
- Website: eastchamparan.bih.nic.in

Raxaul (Raksaul) is a sub-divisional town in the East Champaran district of the Indian state of Bihar. It is situated on the India–Nepal border and shares its boundary with the city of Birgunj in Nepal. Raxaul serves as a major railway junction for both domestic and cross-border transport. The Indian border town of Raxaul has become one of the busiest towns for heavy transportation due to high trade volume. Almost 56% of the total products of Birgunj are exported to the Indian state of Bihar through this route.

== Economy and agriculture ==
Raxaul is a major border town in East Champaran district of Bihar, located on the India–Nepal border and serving as an important transit point for trade and movement between the two countries.

The economy of the surrounding region is primarily based on agriculture and cross-border trade activities.

Parts of East Champaran district, including nearby towns such as Mehsi, are known for horticultural production, particularly litchi cultivation, which is a significant agricultural product of the region.

== Demographics ==
As of 2011 India census, Raxaul Bazar had a population of 104,532. Males constitute 54% of the population and females 46%. Raxaul Bazar has an average literacy rate of 75.62%, higher than the state average of 61.80%: male literacy is 82.14%, and female literacy is 68.25%. In Raxaul Bazar, 16.21% of the population is under 6 years of age. People communicate with each other in the Bhojpuri language.

== History ==
The former name of the town is Falejarganj.

Others include Buddhists & Christians etc.

Religion in Raxaul
Religion	Percent
Hinduism	82.7%
Islam	16.16%
Others	1.14%

== Transport ==
Raxaul is the only city that is connected with Nepal. Birgunj railway station is connected by the Nepal Government Railway (NGR) to Raxaul Junction railway station in Bihar across the border with India. The 47 kilometres (29 mi) railway extends north to Amlekhganj in Nepal. It was built in 1927 by the British but discontinued beyond Birgunj in December 1965. The 6 km (3.7 mi) railway track from Raxaul to Birgunj was converted to broad gauge two years after the Indian railways converted the track to Raxaul inside India to broad gauge. Now, broad gauge railway line connects Raxaul to the Sirsiya (Birgunj) Inland Container Depot (ICD) which became fully operational in 2005. Talks have been held to reopen the railway route from Birgunj to Amlekhganj in Nepal by converting it to broad gauge because of its socio-economic importance.

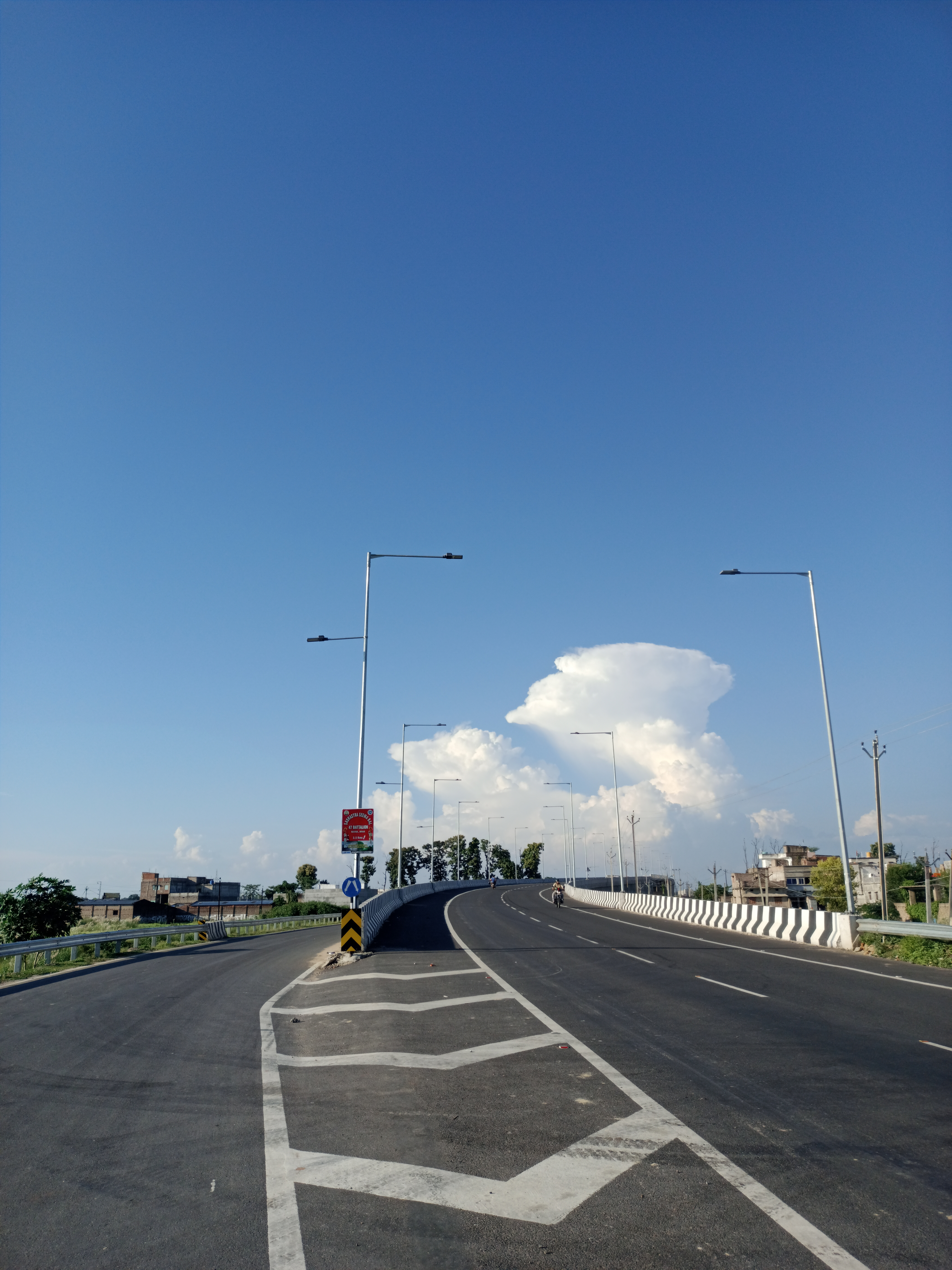
Raxaul Bypass NH28A

=== Rail ===
Raxaul Junction railway station is situated on the Delhi – Gorakhpur - Raxaul - Chakia - Muzaffarpur - Kolkata lines.

Raxaul is connected to several cities in Bihar with daily passenger trains. There are multiple daily connections to Muzaffarpur, Sugauli, Chakia, Bairgania and Sitamarhi and daily connections to Bagaha, Hajipur, Samastipur, Motihari and Narkatiaganj.

Daily express trains connect to Delhi with stops in major cities in Uttar Pradesh including Gorakhpur and Bareilly. Kolkata is also connected by a daily express train; the train being 13021 Howrah Raxaul Mithila Express.

There are also direct trains to Lucknow and Varanasi with stops in several towns in Uttar Pradesh. Chhapra, Patna, chakia, Jabalpur, Mumbai, Darbhanga, Barauni, Dhanbad, Bokaro, Ranchi, Rourkela, Bilaspur, Raipur, Nagpur and Hyderabad are also connected by weekly or multiple weekly trains.

Delhi is connected via Satyagraha Express and Sadbhawna Express. Earlier, all tracks were metre gauge but most have been converted to 5 ft 6 in (1,676 mm) broad gauge. After the completion of the gauge conversion from Darbhanga to Raxaul via Sitamarhi, another broad gauge route to Raxaul became available from March 2014. The metre gauge track from Raxaul to Narkatiaganj converted in 2018/august.03 pair passenger trains operated in this route.

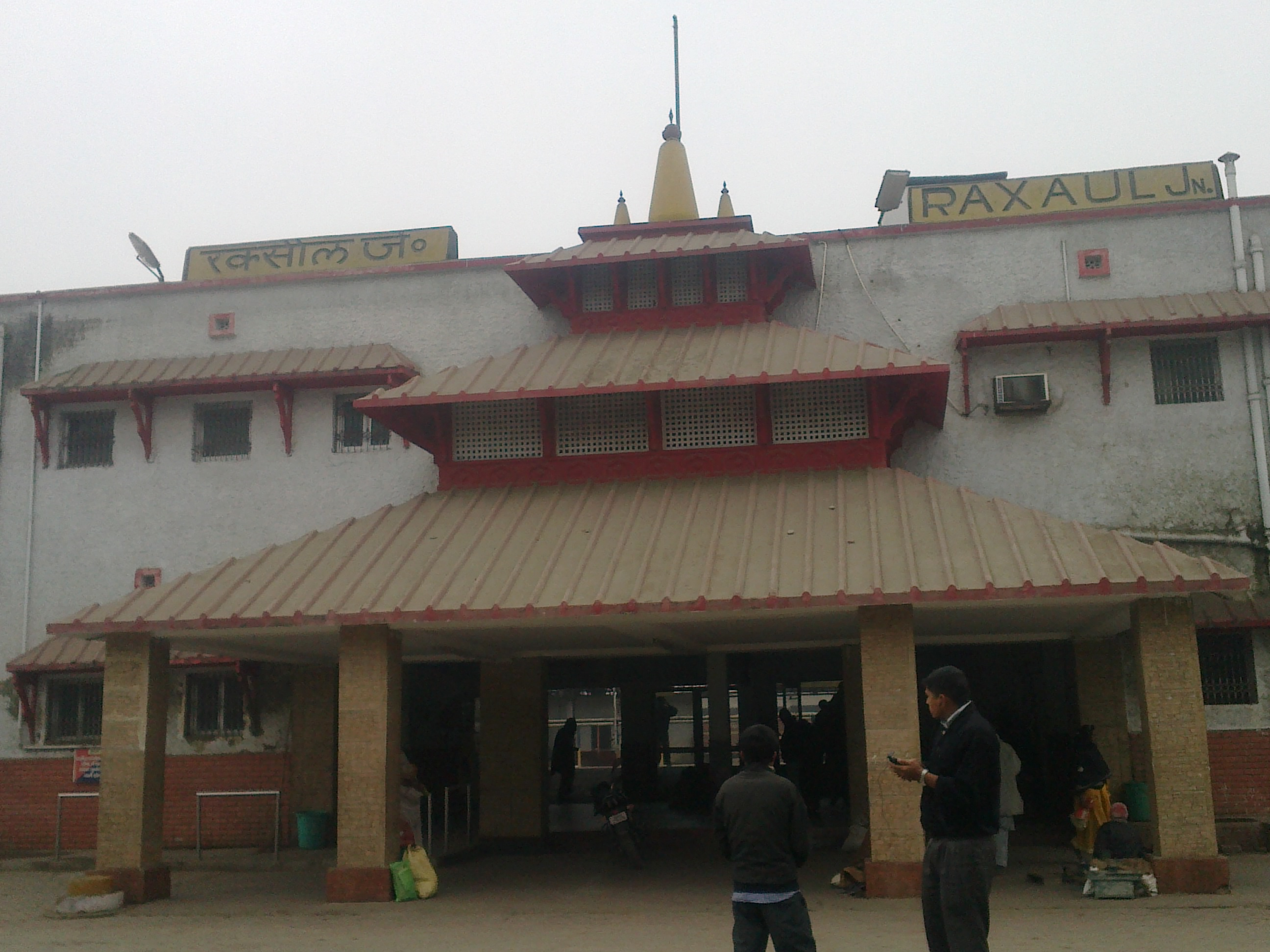
Raxaul Junction in 2011

=== Road ===
Raxaul is connected to major cities of India by National Highway 28A.

It is the main route to Nepal. The capital of Nepal, Kathmandu is connected with India through this highway. There is a bus terminal from where buses are available for most of the cities in Bihar and Jharkhand.

=== Aviation ===
Raxaul Airport (ICAO: VERL) is located in Raxaul. It was established after the Sino-Indian War of 1962, when it served as an emergency landing ground for the Indian Army. The Airports Authority of India (AAI) that owns the airport has undertaken a pre-feasibility study at the airport to upgrade the airport to handle ATR-72 aircraft. A draft Master Plan highlighting a requirement of an additional 121 acres of land has been submitted to the State Government.

Now, there is currently no scheduled commercial air service. Raxaul can be reached by flying to Simara in Nepal. That airport is 27 km from Raxaul and has direct flights to Kathmandu. A proposal to operationalize the airport for civilian use has been drafted.

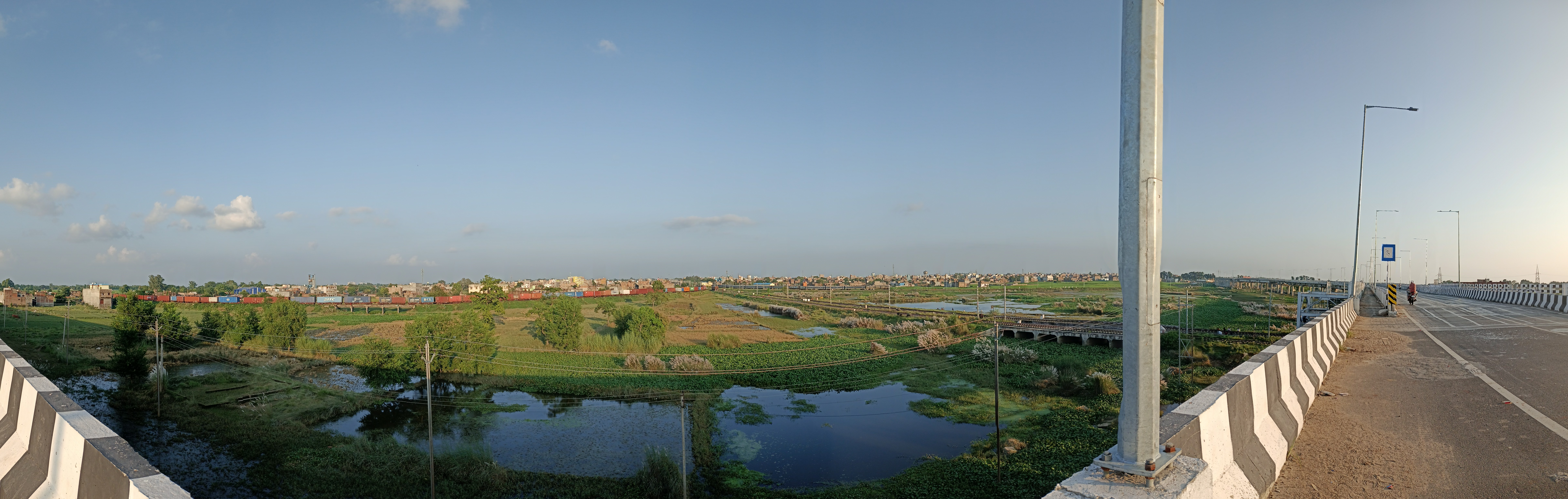
View of Raxaul from Flyover Bypass NH28A

=== Border crossing ===
India and Nepal have an open border with no restrictions on movement of their nationals and no need of visa or passport documents for local people. There is a customs checkpoint for goods and third country nationals. There are Jeeps, Cars, Tempos (Three wheels vehicles), and the Tangas (Horse Driven 6 seater Rickshaws) from Raxaul station for Birganj bus park.

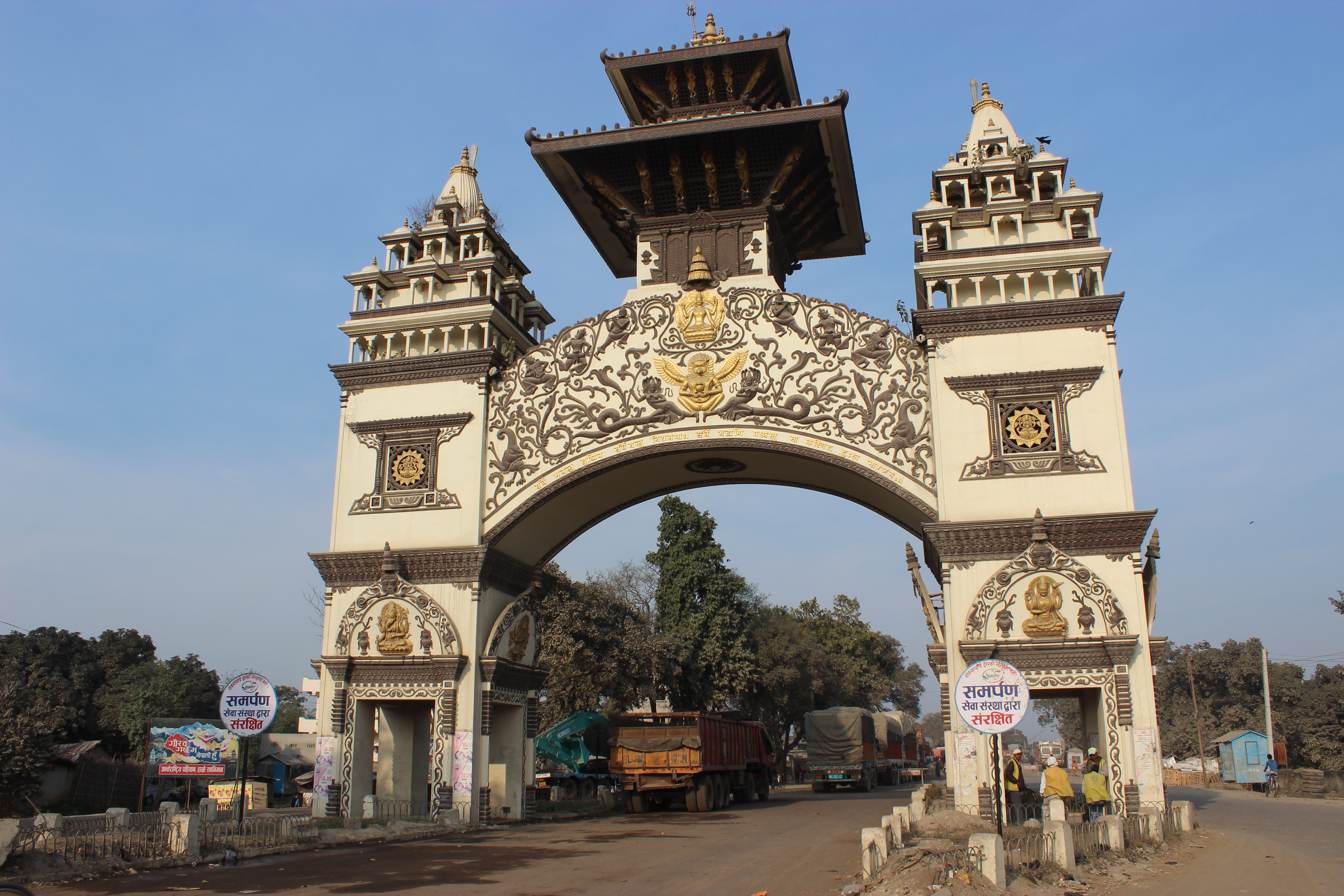
Gateway to Nepal called as Shankaracharya Gate outside Birgunj in 2015

=== Traffic congestion ===
Despite the presence of a bypass road for heavy vehicles, traffic congestion is frequently reported in the town of Raxaul. Local traffic, commercial activities, and the movement of smaller vehicles often lead to severe congestion on the main roads within the city. During peak hours and market periods, long traffic queues are commonly observed in several parts of the town.

A train stuck in traffic at a railway crossing in Raxaul, Bihar in 2018

=== River ===
==== Sariswa River ====
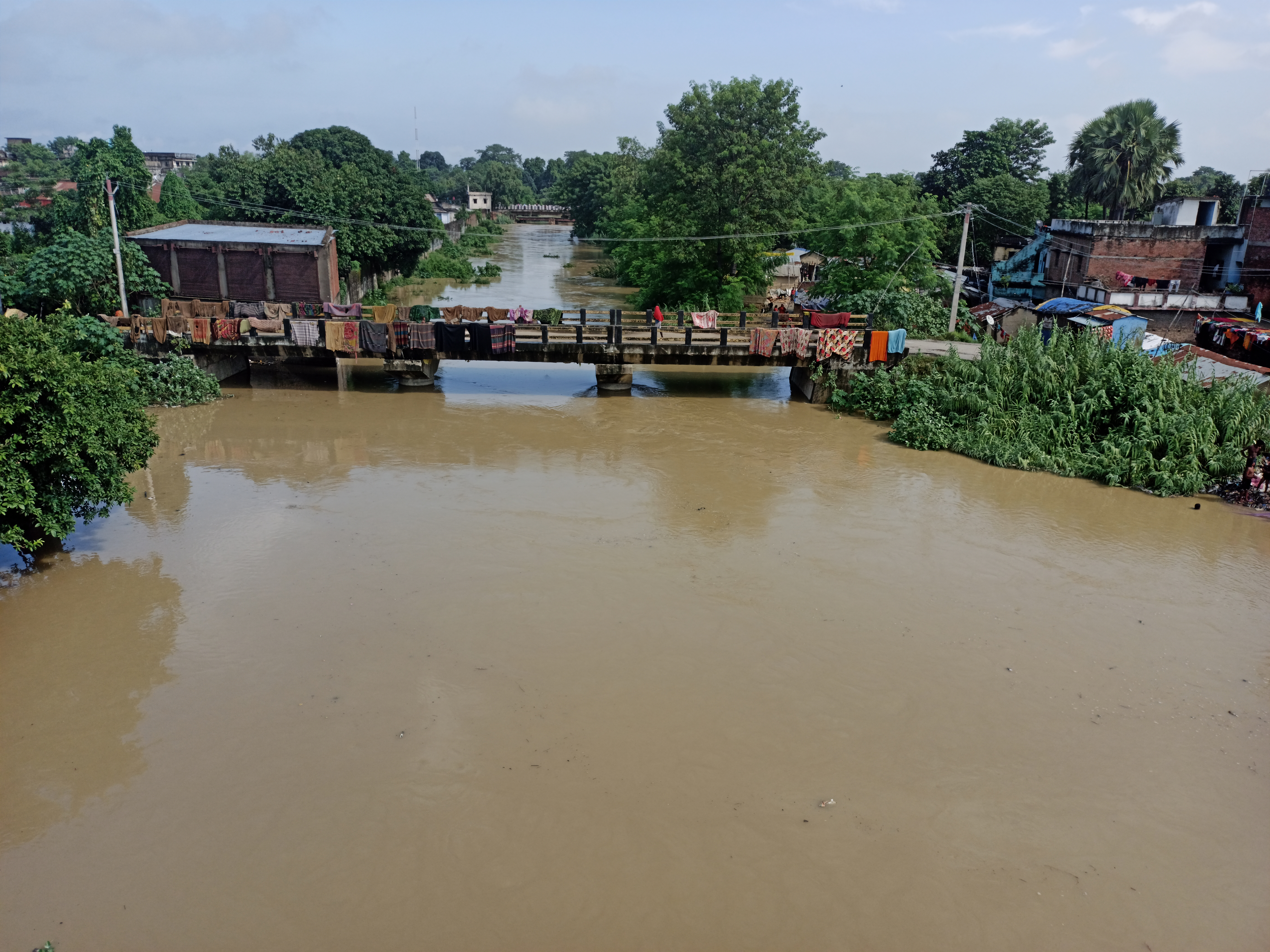
Sariswa River Flood View from Raxaul Railway Footbridge

The river, Sariswa (Sirsiya), a tributary of the Burhi Gandak, originates from Pathlahia hill of the dense Ramban forests in Nepal, its course roaming through the subdivision cutting through Bara and Parsa districts in Nepal and Raxaul in Bihar, India. It flows southwards from the place of its origin for about 15 km in Nepal and then enters India at Raxaul. From here, the river flows about 20 km in India and joins Burhi Gandak near Sugauli in East Champaran district. The water is pure in its contents and have full of medicinal values like other Himalayan rivers. It maintains its valuable contents till Parwanipur. But after it, unrestrained untreated wastes are being dumped by the 46 factories situated at Birgunj (Nepal) which make this river contaminated. The colour of the river turned into black besides, emanating foul smell has made the life of the people, who dwell near the river, a nightmare.

=== Canal ===
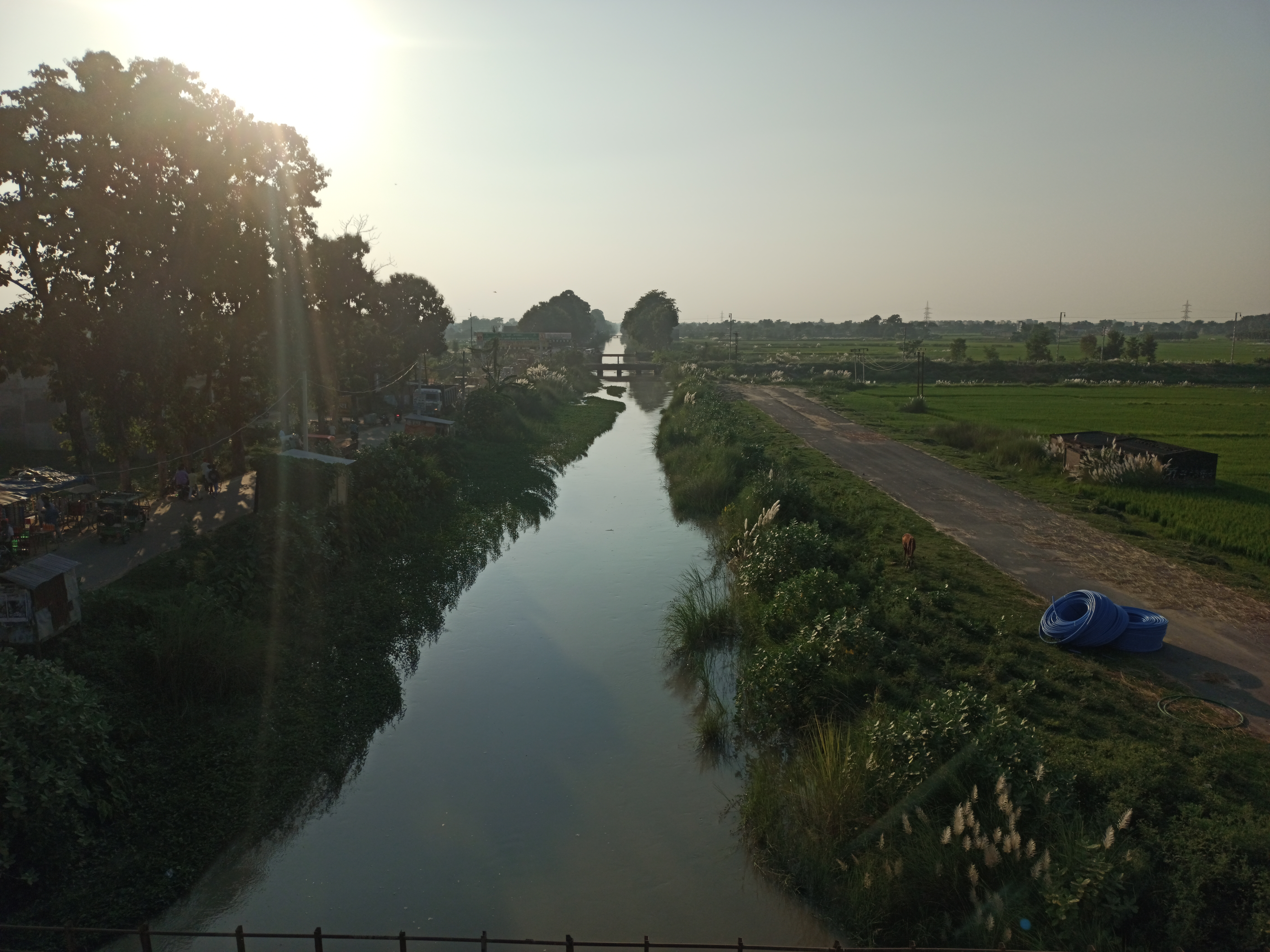
Triveni Canal in Raxaul

The Triveni Canal was constructed in 1979. It is mainly used for irrigation in northwest Bihar. It was built on the Gandak River to provide irrigation to the Champaran district.

==== Bangari River ====
It is the neighbor river of Sariswa (Sirsiya) river.

- Adapur, Bihar
- Birganj, Nepal
- East Champaran district

== Villages ==
According to the 2011 Census of India, Raxaul Block comprises the following 43 villages.

=== List of Villages ===
S.No.	Village Name	Population (2011)
1	Bahuari	6,742
2	Bairiya Birt	2,736
3	Banjariya Sirsia	0
4	Belwa	3,406
5	Bharatmahi	3,561
6	Bhelahi	10,471
7	Chanduli	929
8	Chikni	2,877
9	Dhangarhwa	1,983
10	Ekderwa	2,061
11	Gamhariya	3,284
12	Gamhariya Anand Sagar	1,983
13	Haraiya	1,916
14	Hardiya	11,458
15	Harnahi	6,567
16	Jakiyari	4,918
17	Jatiyahi	1,760
18	Kanana Parshotimpur	6,543
19	Kaurihar	9,703
20	Kawa Dhangar	2,266
21	Khirichhiya	2,448
22	Lachmanwa	3,554
23	Lachmipur	2,866
24	Laukariya	7,378
25	Mashna Deeh	172
26	Noneya	9,379
27	Palanwan	13,390
28	Pantoka	4,421
29	Parsona Tapsi	9,455
30	Pipariya	2,845
31	Purandra	8,499
32	Saunaha	3,496
33	Semri	2,215
34	Senuariya	1,637
35	Sidhpur	2,496
36	Sihorwa	1,628
37	Sihpur	2,496
38	Sirmapur	2,496
39	Sirsia Nizamat	2,496
40	Sirsia Birt	2,496
41	Siswa	2,496
42	Siswaniya	2,496
43	Raxaul Bazar (Nagar Parishad)	55,536

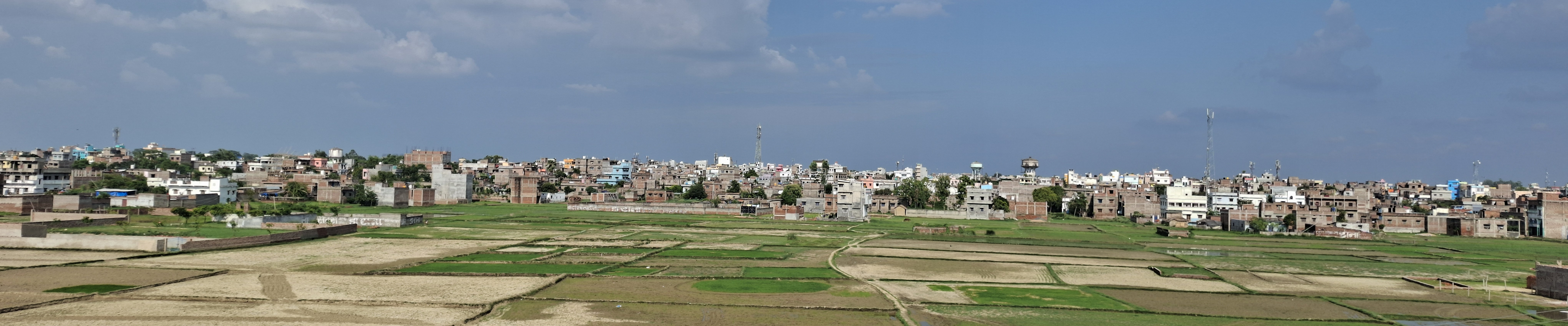
Aerial View of Raxaul from Bypass Flyover
