= Mithila Express =

Passenger train service in India

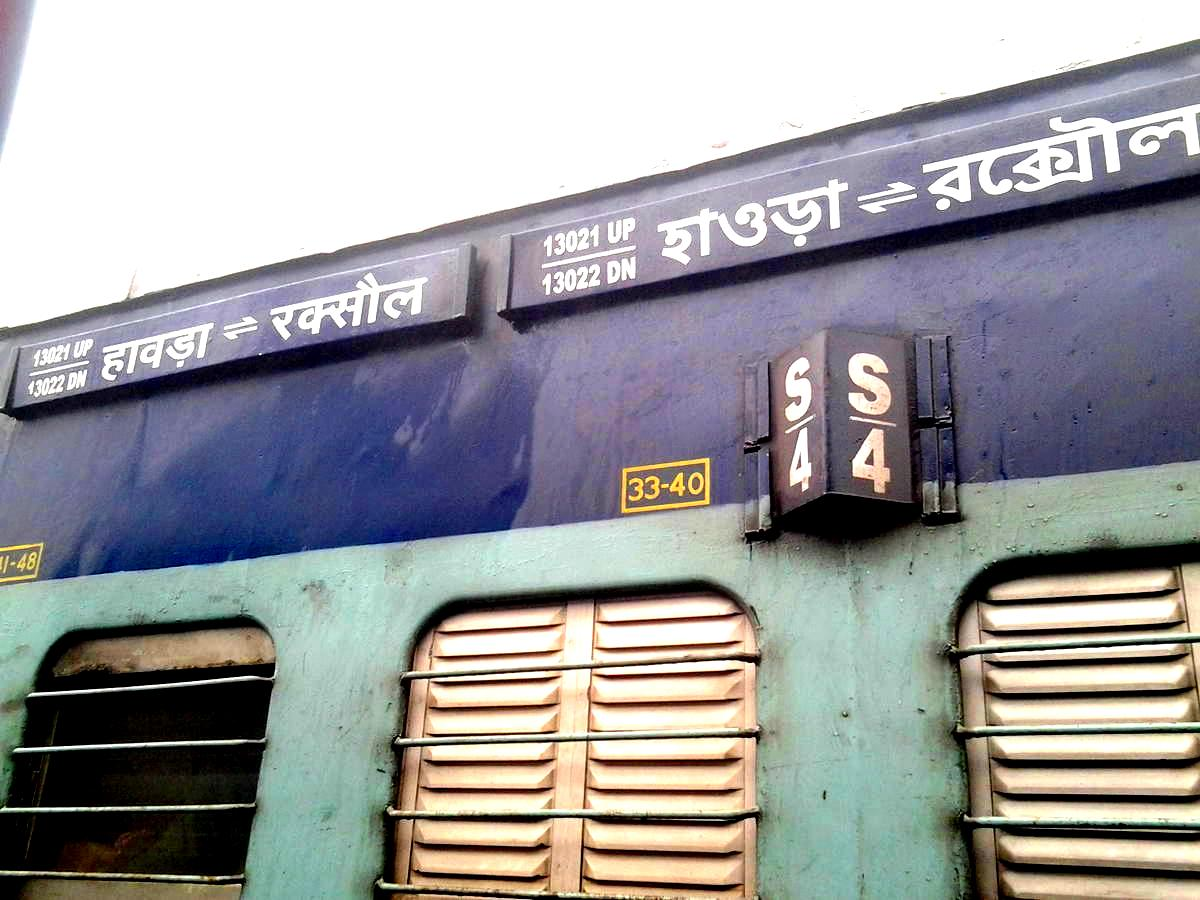
- Howrah-Raxaul Mithila Express, Nameplate

Overview
- Service type: Express
- Locale: Bihar, Jharkhand and West Bengal
- First service: 1 October 1959; 67 years ago
- Current operator: Eastern Railway

Route
- Termini: Howrah Junction railway station Raxaul
- Stops: 41
- Distance travelled: 694 km (431 mi)
- Average journey time: 17 hours 15 minutes
- Service frequency: Daily
- Train number: 13021 / 13022

On-board services
- Classes: AC 2 Tier, AC 3 Tier, sleeper, general
- Seating arrangements: Available
- Sleeping arrangements: Available
- Catering facilities: Not Available
- Baggage facilities: Available (storage space under berth)

Technical
- Track gauge: 1,676 mm (5 ft 6 in)
- Operating speed: 44 km/h (27 mph) average with halts
Route map
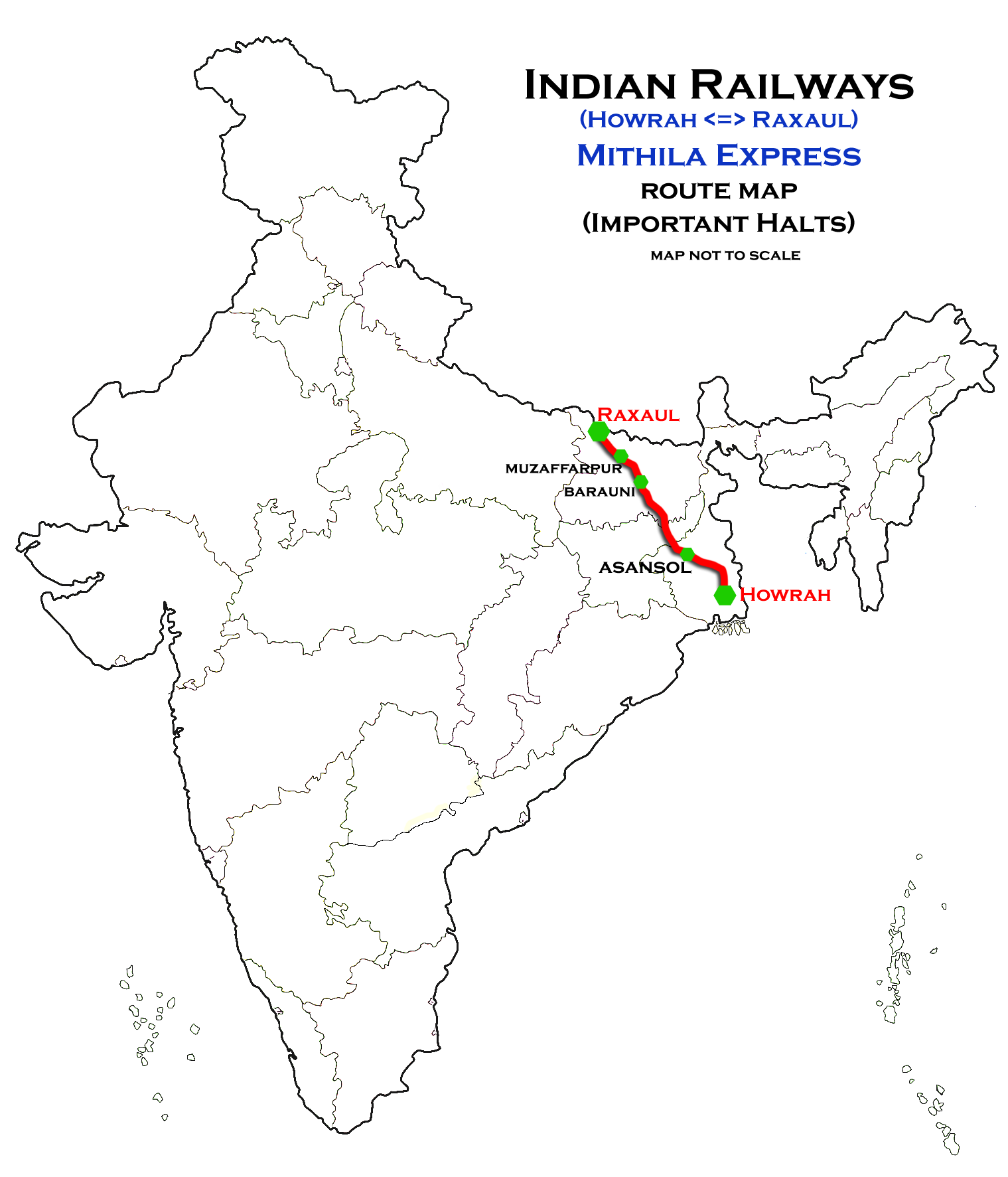

The 13021 / 13022 Howrah Junction-Raxaul railway station Mithila Express is an express train belonging to Indian Railways - Eastern Railway zone that runs between Howrah Junction and Raxaul railway station in India.

It operates as train number 13021 from Howrah Junction to Raxaul railway station and as train number 13022 in the reverse direction serving the states of Bihar, Jharkhand and West Bengal. As Raxaul-Birgunj border is the main entry point to Nepal, Mithila express serves as one of the main rail links to Nepal as well.

In March 2025, an alert driver avoided a probable derailment.

== Service ==
The Express covers the distance of 692 km (430 mi) in 16 hours 45 mins (44 km/h) to Raxaul and in 18 hours 0 mins to Howrah (38 km/h). This train is reserved well ahead of its departure dates.

== Coaches ==
The Express consists of a total of 21 LHB type coaches of types 2AC 2-Tier, 10AC 3-Tier, 4 sleeper, 4 general (Unreserved) and a ilitary coach (occasionally) 2 SLR. Sleeper Extra (SE) coaches are attached during the time of festivals.

== Routing ==
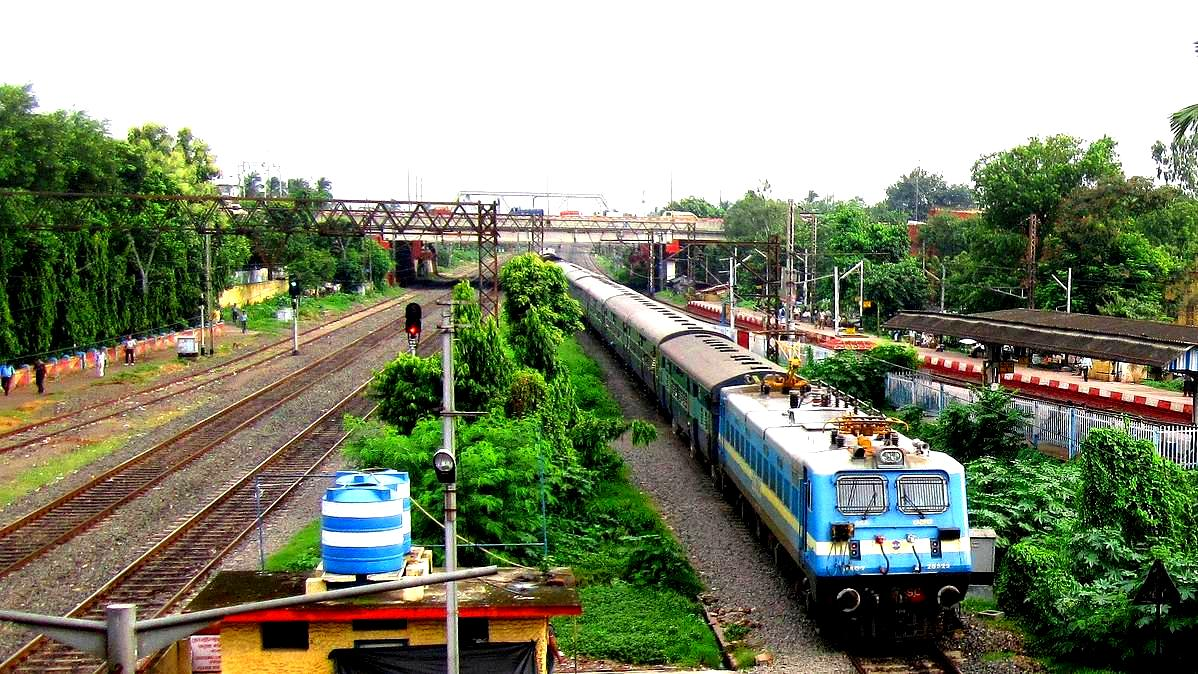
WAG 7 drives Mithila Express through a chord line towards Bandel Junction

The Express runs from Howrah Junction via Serampore → Bandel → Barddhaman Junction → Durgapur → Raniganj → Asansol Junction → Chittaranjan → Madhupur → Jasidih → Jhajha → Kiul Junction → Barauni Junction → Samastipur Junction → Muzaffarpur Junction → Sagauli → to Raxaul.

In February 2024, a change in the route was announced.

== Traction ==
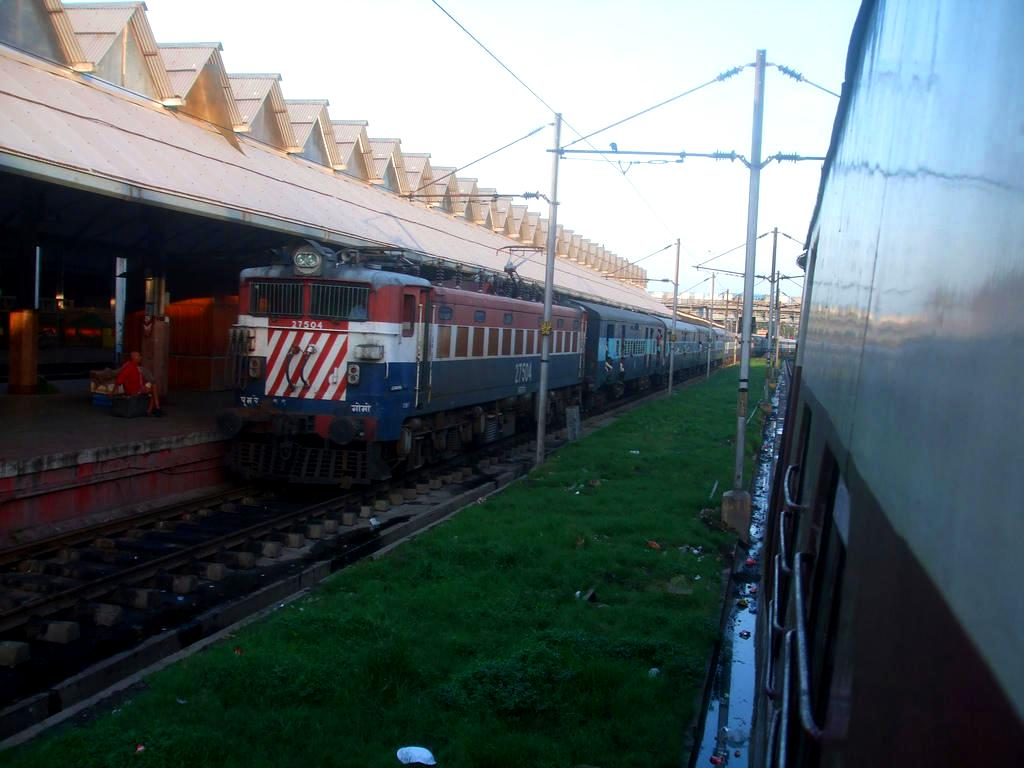
Mithila Express arriving Howrah from Raxaul in the morning

As the track between Muzaffarpur Junction and Raxaul has been electrified, the journey is covered by an electric locomotive WAP 4. Track doubling work between Muzaffarpur and Bapudham Motihari is under progress.

== See also ==
- Howrah Junction railway station
- Raxaul Junction railway station
- Howrah - Raxaul Express
