= Sitamarhi Junction railway station =

Railway station in Sitamarhi, Bihar, India

Sitamarhi Junction
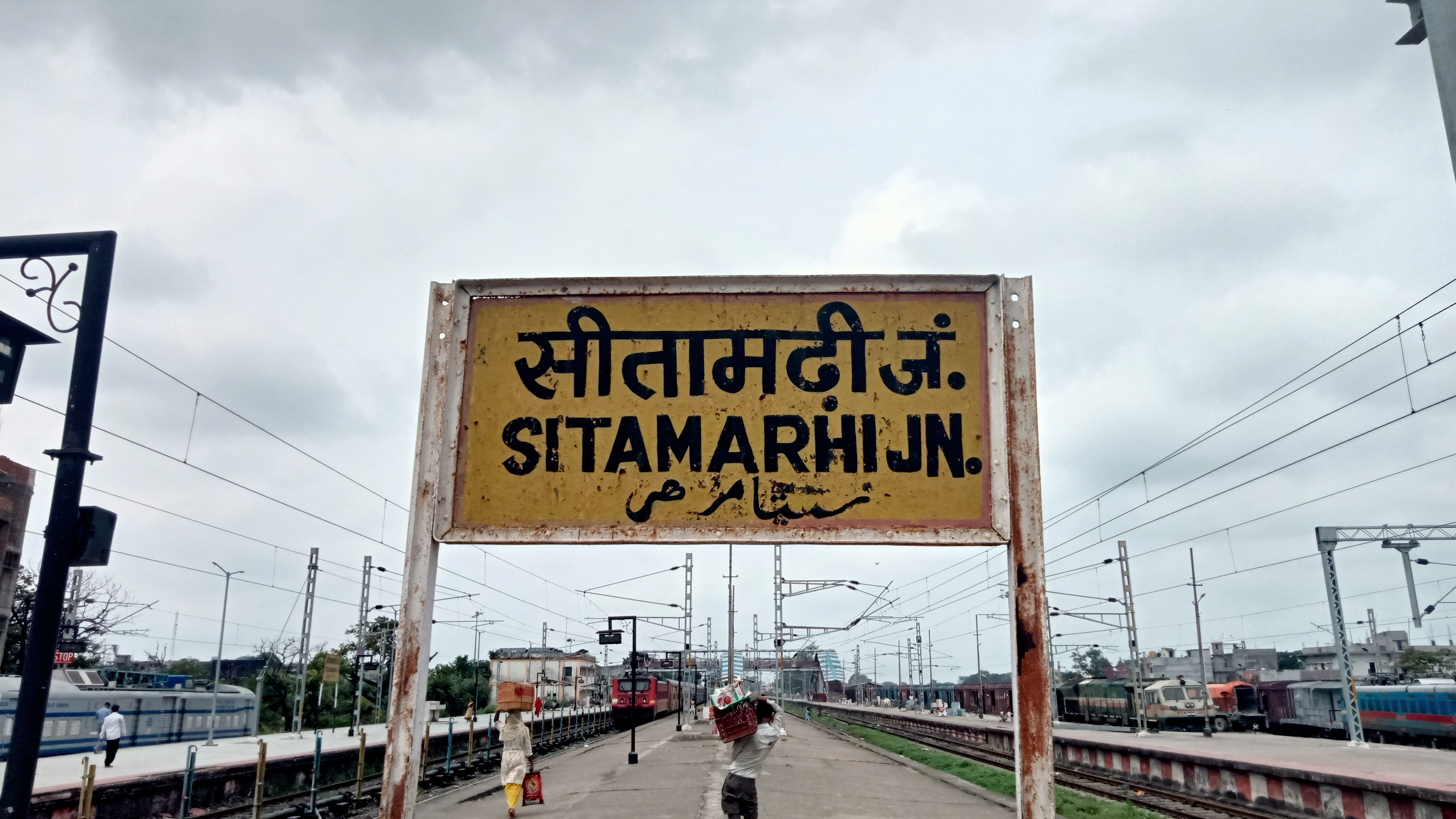
- Banner of the Sitamarhi Junction railway station

General information
- Location: Near Mehsaul Chowk Sitamarhi, Bihar; India
- Coordinates: 26.5949°N 85.5046°E
- Elevation: 69 metres (226 ft)
- System: Indian Railways station
- Owner: Indian Railways
- Operator: East Central
- Lines: Sitamarhi–Hajipur line (via Muzaffarpur); Sitamarhi–Gorakhpur line (via Raxaul, Narkatiyaganj); Sitamarhi–Samastipur line (via Darbhanga)
- Platforms: 5
- Tracks: 8

Construction
- Structure type: Standard (on ground station)
- Parking: Yes
- Cycle facilities: No

Other information
- Status: Active
- Station code: SMI
- Zone(s): East Central Railway
- Division(s): Samastipur

History
- Opened: 1890
- Electrified: Yes.
Location
- Location within Bihar Location within India Location within Asia

Sitamarhi Junction railway station is a main railway station in Sitamarhi district, Bihar. Its code is SMI. It serves Sitamarhi City. The station consists of five platforms. It is an A category railway station of the Samastipur railway division.

The Sitamarhi Junction is well connected to most of the major cities in India like Patna, Delhi, Mumbai, Kolkata, Kanpur, Guwahati, Lucknow, Varanasi, Allahabad and other cities by the railway network and serves the city with numerous trains. It is also the originating station for five superfasts and express trains.

The Darbhanga–Sitamarhi–Raxaul track was converted to broad gauge in February 2014. Another broad-gauge track connects Sitamarhi to Muzaffarpur.

The major facilities available are waiting rooms, retiring room, a computerized reservation facility, reservation counter, vehicle parking, etc.

There are refreshment rooms, vegetarian and non-vegetarian foodstuffs, tea stall, book stall, post and telegraphic office and Government Railway police office.

== Redevelopment ==
Sitamarhi railway station is undergoing a major redevelopment project under Amrit Bharat Station Scheme, estimated to cost ₹255.75 crore . The project aims to transform the station into a modern transportation hub, providing world-class facilities and amenities to passengers.

Key features of the redevelopment Plan

- New Station Building: A state-of-the-art building with modern architecture
- Elevated Road: An elevated road to improve connectivity and reduce congestion
- Air Plaza: A spacious 108-meter-wide air plaza spanning over platforms, providing a comfortable environment for travelers
- Multilevel Car Parking: Ample parking space for vehicles
- Lifts and Escalators: Easy access to all platforms and floors
- Access Control System
- Enhanced security measures
- Firefighting System: Advanced fire safety features
- Second Entry: Additional entry point for passengers
- Modern Amenities: World-class amenities, including Wi-Fi, food courts, and retail outlets

== Nearby railway stations ==
- Bhisa Halt railway station
- Dumra railway station
- Tapaswinarayan Nagar Halt railway station
- Parsauni railway station
- Janakpur Road railway station
- Muzaffarpur Junction
- Darbhanga Junction
- Raxaul Junction

== Trains ==
- Kolkata–Sitamarhi Express
- Mithilanchal Express
- Raxaul–Lokmanya Tilak Terminus Karmabhoomi Express
- Howrah–Raxaul Express
- Lichchavi Express
- Sadbhavna Express (via Sitamarhi)
- New Jalpaiguri–Sitamarhi Weekly Express
- Sadbhavna Express (via Faizabad)
- Kamakhya–Shri Mata Vaishno Devi Katra Express
- Sealdah–Muzaffarpur Express
- Patliputra–Raxaul DEMU
- AMRIT BHARAT EXPRESS
- AMRIT BHARAT EXPRESS (DARBHANGA VIA ANAND VIHAR TERMINAL)
