= Pokhraira =

- Village
- Location in the Bihar state of India Pokhraira (India)
- Coordinates: 26°22′22.759″N 85°36′36.278″E
- Country: India
- State: Bihar
- District: Sitamarhi

Language
  - Official Language: Urdu and Hindi
- Time zone: UTC+5:30 (IST)
- PIN: 843326
- Literacy: 84%
- Lok Sabha constituency: Sitamarhi
- Vidhan Sabha constituency: Bajpatti
- Climate: Typical Indian climate

Pokhraira is a village in Bokhra block of Sitamarhi District in Bihar state of India. It is surrounded by three main cities of Bihar, which are Muzaffarpur, Darbhanga and Sitamarhi. Pokhraira is 27 km distance from district main city Sitamarhi and 97 km distance from state capital Patna.

== History ==
A village which is a centre not only for education but also for years long culture and civilization. A small remote village of North Bihar produced numbers of scholars spread all across the country. This village is also known due to some famous Zamindars.

Pokhraira, also known as Pokhraira Sharif, is a village revered for its association with Sufi saints. One of the most renowned spiritual figures from this village is Maulana Abdur Rehman, also known as Sarkar Mohibba, a title given by Aala Hazrat. His mazar (tomb) is a prominent site in this entire region. Another notable figure is the Sufi Pir Mufti Soedurrahman, whose tomb is adjacent to Sarkar Mohibba's.

Additionally, Sufi Pir Sayyed Abu Nasar Hamdullah Kamaluddeen, who came from the northwestern part of British India, lived in Pokhraira for a period and had a significant spiritual influence on many people in the region. The village also boasts of literary contributions, such as the Bihar State prayer song written by M.R. Chisty, a native of Pokhraira. Mustafa Raza, known as Shabnam Kamali, was another famous poet from this village. The phrase "A village where even the hen is educated" aptly describes Pokhraira, highlighting its rich cultural and intellectual heritage. The long list of distinguished individuals from this village continues to bring pride to the village and the district.

== Education ==
Pokhraira is renowned for its active engagement in the field of education. The village is home to numerous government schools, private schools, and religious schools (madrasas). Among these is a government girls' school, formerly known as Pardanashin Urdu Maktab, which has played a significant role in promoting education for girls in the region. This strong educational infrastructure highlights the village's commitment to learning and intellectual growth.

Government School

- Urdu Primary Girls School, (Phoolwaari Mohalla)
- Urdu Primary School, (Noori Mohalla)
- Primary School Mushari Tola, (Raza Nagar)
- Middle School Shah Tola, (Phoolwaari Mohalla)
- High School Shah Tola, (Phoolwaari Mohalla)

Private School

- Ideal Kinder Garten, (Kamali Mohalla)
- Shabnam Academy, (Kamali Mohalla)
- S.M. Public School, (Madrasah Mohalla)

Religious School/Madrasah

- Madrasah Noorul Hoda
- Madrasah Jamia Rahmania Hamdia
- Madrasah Rahmania
- Madrasah Jamiatul Binat al Islamia

Trust and Organizations

- Hamdi Educational Trust. (Running in the Memory of Zafar-E-Millat Allama Zafrul Hussain Hamdi Zafar Qadri)
- S.M. Foundation (Running in the Memory of Sarkar Abdur Rahman Mohibba)
- Bazm-E-Kamal (Religious Organization)

== Mosques/Masajid ==
- Jama Masjid (Kamali Mohalla)
- Kamal Masjid (Kamal Chowk)
- Phoolwari Masjid (Phoolwari Mohalla)
- Aulia Masjid (Madarsa Mohalla)
- Noori Masjid (Noori Mohalla)
- Raza Masjid (Raza Nagar)
- Rahmani Masjid (Madarsa Mohalla)
- Shahi Masjid (Shah Mohalla)

== Transportation ==
Pokhraira is about 2 km from State Highway and 11 km from National Highway NH 77. This village has seen road development very earlier. There is a main road and a bridge which were constructed during British Raj. This village is well connected by three of its nearest main cities by roadway. Every day 4 to 5 buses depart from Pokhraira Panchayat to Muzaffarpur, Darbhanga and Sitamarhi.

Nearest Railway Station- Janakpur Road (Pupri) 16km
Nearest Airport- Darbhanga Airport 56km

== Health Care ==
Pokhraira is equipped with numerous clinics, including one of the oldest government hospitals in the region, a Unani Hospital. This hospital was founded thanks to the generosity of Haji Mohammad Taslim, a local Zamindar who donated the land for its establishment. The Unani Hospital provides free Unani medicine to patients, serving as a vital healthcare resource for the community.

== Demographic ==
According to the 2011 Indian census the population of Pokhraira is 5716 in which the percentage of male is 51.83% and the female is 48.17%. The gender ratio of this village is 930 female per 1000 male. The 95% population is Muslim and remaining is the lower cast of Hindu. The recent local data shows the population is above the 8000 and the literacy rate is above 92%.
