= New Jalpaiguri–Sitamarhi Weekly Express =

Express train in India

Overview
- Service type: Express
- First service: 1 October 2011; 14 years ago
- Current operator: Northeast Frontier Railway zone

Route
- Termini: New Jalpaiguri Junction (NJP); Sitamarhi Junction (SMI)
- Stops: 11
- Distance travelled: 546 km (339 mi)
- Average journey time: 13h
- Service frequency: Weekly (Note: Runs one day in a week for every direction.)
- Train number: 1572/15724

On-board services
- Classes: AC 2 tier, AC 3 tier, Sleeper class, General Unreserved
- Seating arrangements: No
- Sleeping arrangements: Yes
- Catering facilities: On-board catering E-catering
- Observation facilities: ICF coach
- Entertainment facilities: No
- Baggage facilities: No
- Other facilities: Below the seats

Technical
- Rolling stock: 1
- Track gauge: 1,676 mm (5 ft 6 in)
- Operating speed: 42 km/h (26 mph), including halts

The New Jalpaiguri–Sitamarhi Weekly Express is an Express train belonging to Northeast Frontier Railway zone that runs between New Jalpaiguri Junction and Sitamarhi Junction in India. It is currently being operated with 1572/15724 train numbers on a weekly basis.

== Service ==
The 15723/New Jalpaiguri–Sitamarhi Weekly Express has an average speed of 42 km/h and covers 546 km in 13h. The 15724/Sitamarhi–New Jalpaiguri Weekly Express has an average speed of 45 km/h and covers 546 km in 12h 5m.

== Route and halts ==
The important halts of the train are:

- New Jalpaiguri Junction
- Aluabari Road Junction
- Kishanganj
- Dalkhola
- Katihar Junction
- Naugachia
- Begusarai
- Barauni Junction
- Samastipur Junction
- Darbhanga Junction
- Kamtaul
- Janakpur Road
- Sitamarhi Junction

== Coach composition ==
The train has standard ICF rakes with max speed of 110 kmph. The train consists of 19 coaches:

- 1 First AC and Three-tier AC
- 1 AC III Tier
- 12 Sleeper coaches
- 3 General
- 2 Seating cum Luggage Rake

== Traction ==
Both trains are hauled by a Malda Loco Shed-based WDM-3A diesel locomotive from Jalpaiguri to Sitamarhi and vice versa.

== Rake sharing ==
The train shares its rake with 15721/15722 Paharia Express.

== See also ==
- Sitamarhi Junction railway station
- New Jalpaiguri Junction railway station
- Kishanganj–Ajmer Garib Nawaz Express
- Paharia Express
