= Sitamarhi–Delhi Junction Amrit Bharat Express =

Amrit Bharat Express train route in India

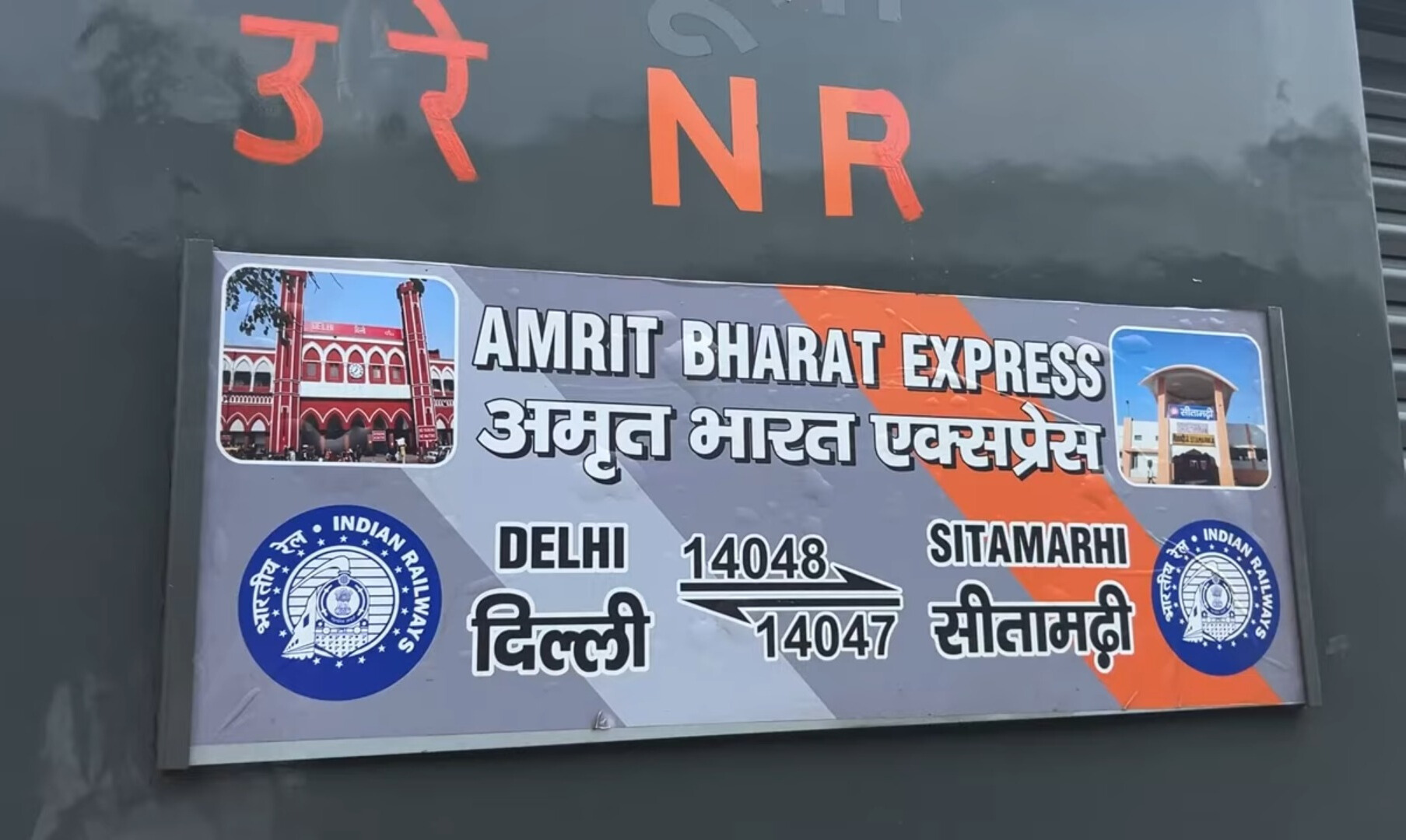

Overview
- Service type: Amrit Bharat Express, Express trains in India
- Status: Active
- Locale: Bihar, Uttar Pradesh and New Delhi
- First service: 8 August 2025 (Inaugural); 9 August 2025; 13 months ago (Commercial)
- Current operator: Northern Railways (NR)

Route
- Termini: Sitamarhi Junction (SMI); Delhi Junction (DLI)
- Stops: 16
- Distance travelled: 1,050 km (652 mi)
- Average journey time: 24h 25m
- Service frequency: Weekly
- Train number: 14047/14048
- Lines used: Sitamarhi–Raxaul–Narkatiaganj line; Narkatiaganj–Kaptanganj line; Gorakhpur–Gonda–Lucknow Charbagh line; Lucknow–Kanpur line; Kanpur–New Delhi line

On-board services
- Class: Sleeper class coach (SL) General unreserved coach (GS)
- Seating arrangements: Yes
- Sleeping arrangements: Yes
- Auto-rack arrangements: Upper
- Catering facilities: On-board catering
- Observation facilities: Saffron-grey
- Entertainment facilities: Electric outlets; Reading lights; Bottle holder
- Other facilities: CCTV cameras; Bio-vacuum toilets; Foot-operated water taps; Passenger information system

Technical
- Rolling stock: Modified LHB coaches
- Track gauge: Indian gauge
- Electrification: 25 kV 50 Hz AC overhead line
- Operating speed: 53 km (33 mi) (Avg.)
- Track owner: Indian Railways
- Rake sharing: No

The 14047/14048 Sitamarhi–Delhi Junction Amrit Bharat Express is India's 8th Non-AC Superfast Amrit Bharat Express train, which currently runs across the states of Bihar and New Delhi, the capital city of India. Sitamarhi city is located in the Sitamarhi District of Bihar.

The express train was inaugurated on August 8, 2025, by Home Minister Amit Shah through video conference.

== Overview ==
The train is operated by Indian Railways, connecting Sitamarhi Junction and Old Delhi Junction. It is currently operated with train numbers 14047/14048 on weekly services.

== Rakes ==
It is the 8th Amrit Bharat 2.0 Express train in which the locomotives were designed by Chittaranjan Locomotive Works (CLW) at Chittaranjan, West Bengal and the coaches were designed and manufactured by the Integral Coach Factory at Perambur, Chennai under the Make in India initiative.

== Services ==
The 14047/14048 Sitamarhi–Delhi Junction Amrit Bharat Express currently operates 1 days in a week, covering a distance of 1,050 km (650 mi) in a travel time of 24 hrs 25 mins with an average speed of 43 km/h (26 mph). The Maximum Permissible Speed (MPS) is 130 km/h (81 mph).

== Routes and halts ==
The halts for this 14047/14048 Sitamarhi–Delhi Junction Amrit Bharat Express are as follows :

1. Sitamarhi Junction
2. Bairgania
3. Raxaul Junction
4. Sikta
5. Narkatiaganj Junction
6. Bagaha
7. Siswa Bazar
8. Kaptanganj Junction
9. Gorakhpur Junction
10. Basti
11. Gonda Junction
12. Lucknow Charbagh
13. Kanpur Central
14. Tundla Junction
15. Ghaziabad Junction
16. Old Delhi Junction

== Rake reversal ==
There is no rake reversal or rake share.

== See also ==
- Amrit Bharat Express
- Vande Bharat Express
- Tejas Express
- Duronto Express
- Sitamarhi Junction railway station
- Delhi Junction railway station

== Notes ==
Runs a day in a week with both directions.

14047 – Sunday | 14048 – Saturday
