= Sikta railway station =

Railway station in Bihar, India

Sikta
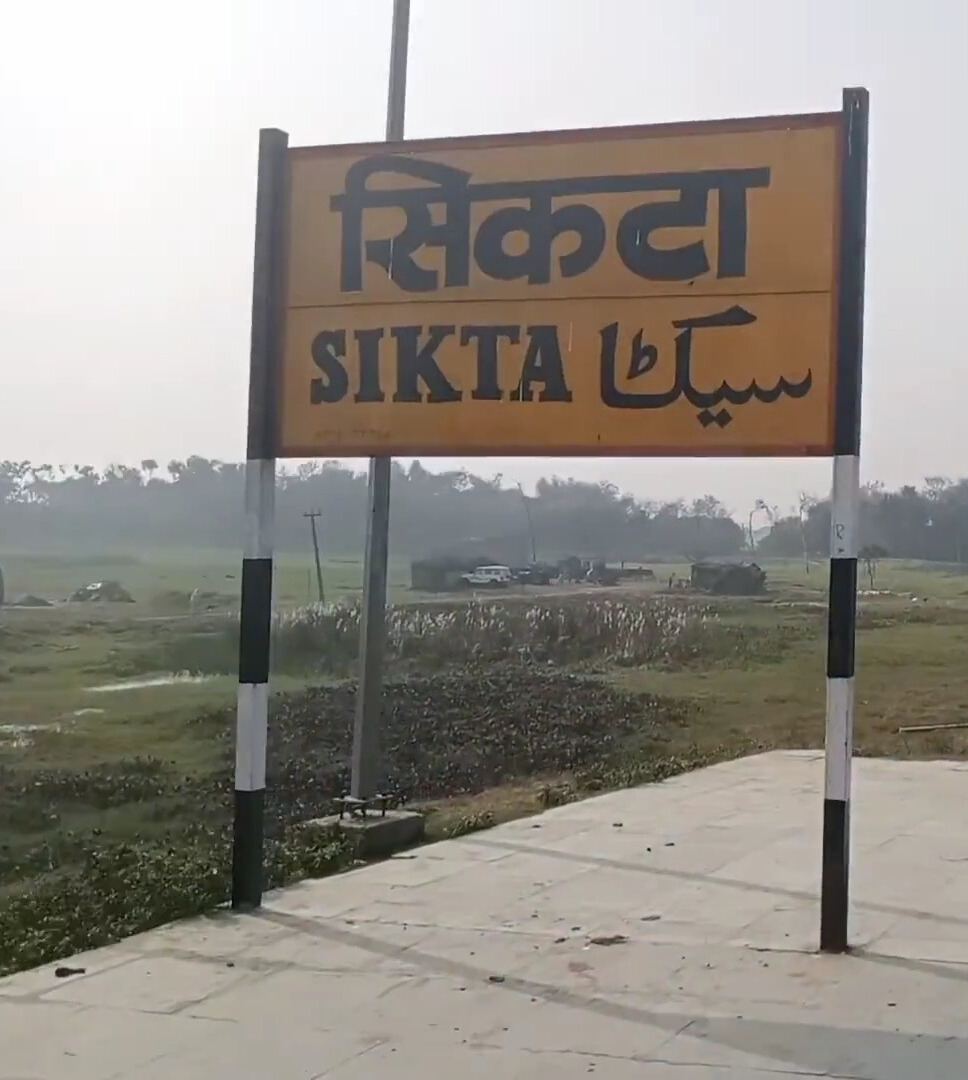
- Station Board

General information
- Location: Balther- Sikta Rd, Khapparsa, West Champaran, Bihar; India
- Coordinates: 27.024932°N 84.681226°E
- Elevation: 61 metres (200 ft)
- System: Indian Railways station
- Owner: Indian Railways
- Operator: East Central
- Line: Muzaffarpur–Gorakhpur main line
- Platforms: 2
- Tracks: 2

Construction
- Structure type: On-ground
- Parking: Yes
- Accessible: Available

Other information
- Status: Functioning
- Station code: STF
- Zone(s): East Central Railway zone
- Division(s): Samastipur

History
- Opened: 1930

Passengers
- Daily: 500+
Location
- Location within Bihar Location within India
- Interactive map

Sikta railway station (station code: STF), is a small railway station located in West Champaran district, of the Indian state of Bihar. It is operated by Indian Railways under the East Central Railway zone. The station serves the local population of Sikta and nearby villages, facilitating passenger movement in the region. Despite being a smaller station compared to major junctions, it plays an important role in connecting residents to larger towns and cities along the route. The station handles around 500+ passengers daily, providing essential rail connectivity for commuting and regional travel.

== Major Trains ==
- Sitamarhi–Delhi Junction Amrit Bharat Express (14047/14048)
- Saharsa–Chheharta (Amritsar) Amrit Bharat Express (14627/14628)
- Darbhanga–Anand Vihar Terminal Amrit Bharat Express (15557/15558)
- Darbhanga–Gomti Nagar (Lucknow) Amrit Bharat Express (15561/15562)
- Madar (Ajmer)–Darbhanga Amrit Bharat Express (19623/19624)
