= Sealdah–Sitamarhi Express =

Indian express train service

Overview
- Service type: Express
- Status: Not Operational
- Current operator: Eastern Railways

Route
- Termini: Sealdah (SDAH); Sitamarhi Junction (SMI)
- Stops: 74 (+1 [DN])
- Distance travelled: 634 km
- Average journey time: 21 hour 15 minutes
- Service frequency: Daily

On-board services
- Classes: Sleeper class, Unreserved

Technical
- Rolling stock: ICF rakes
- Operating speed: Average=30 km/h Maximum=110 km/h

The Sealdah–Sitamarhi Express is an express train service in India operated by the Indian Railways. It connects Sealdah in West Bengal with Sitamarhi Junction in Bihar. It currently operates with 13123/13124 train numbers.

== Routes ==
The train travels on the following route: Sealdah–Dum Dum Junction–Barrackpore–Naihati Junction–Bandel Junction–Barddhaman Junction–Khana Junction–Durgapur–Andal Junction–Asansol Junction–Barachak Junction–Sitarampur Junction–Chittaranjan–Madhupur Junction–Jasidih Junction–Jhajha–Kiul Junction–Luckeesarai Junction–Rampur Dumra Junction–Barauni Junction–Bachhwara Junction–Samastipur Junction–Muzaffarpur Junction–Sitamarhi Junction.

== Schedule ==
Train number	Departure station code	Departure station name	Departure time	Arrival station code	Arrival station name	Arrival time
13123	SDAH	Sealdah	6:00 HRS	SMI	Sitamarhi Junction	03:15 HRS
13124	SMI	Sitamarhi Junction	5:30 HRS	SDAH	Sealdah	03:35 HRS

== Traction ==
- SDAH to BJU: Howrah-based WAG-4
- BJU to SMI: Samastipur-based WDM-3A
- SMI to BJU: Samastipur-based WDM-3A
- BJU to SDAH: Howrah-based WAG-4
