= Hyderabad–Raxaul Express =

Train in India

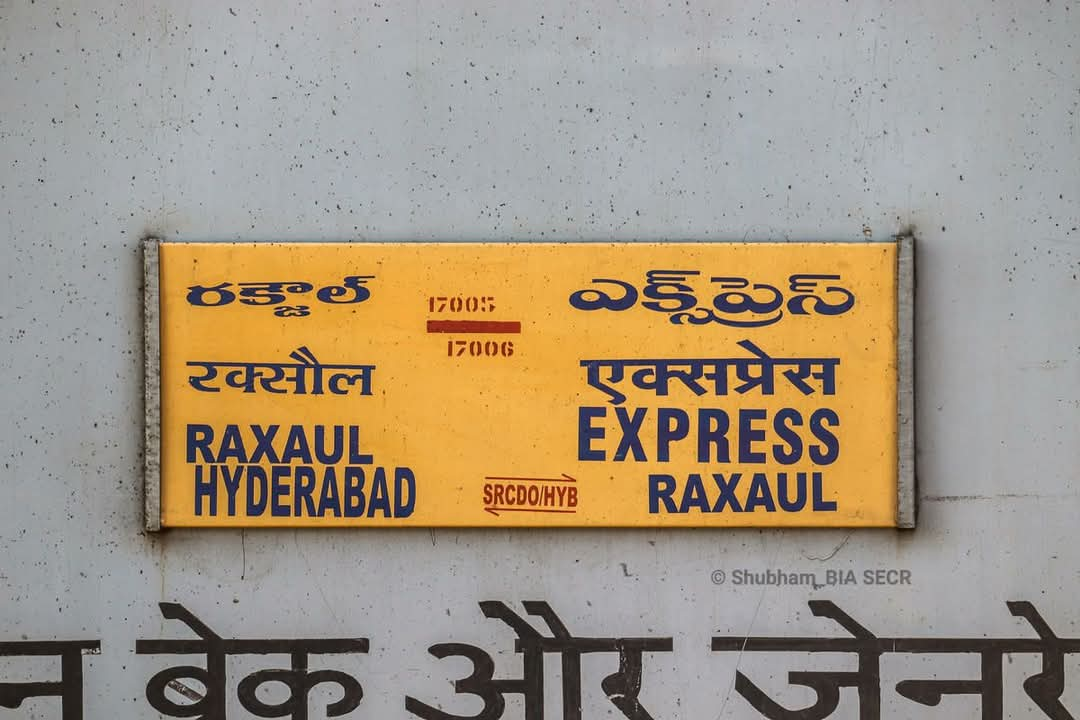
- Name plate

Overview
- Service type: Express
- First service: 7 July 2011; 13 years ago
- Current operator(s): South Central Railway

Route
- Termini: Hyderabad Deccan (HYB); Raxaul Junction (RXL)
- Stops: 28
- Distance travelled: 2,160 km (1,342 mi)
- Average journey time: 43h 30m
- Service frequency: Weekly (Note: Runs one day in a week for every direction.)
- Train number(s): 17005 / 17006

On-board services
- Class(es): AC 2 tier, AC 3 tier, Sleeper class, General Unreserved
- Seating arrangements: Yes
- Sleeping arrangements: Yes
- Catering facilities: On-board catering E-catering
- Observation facilities: Large windows
- Other facilities: Below the seats

Technical
- Rolling stock: LHB coach
- Track gauge: 1,676 mm (5 ft 6 in)
- Operating speed: 51 km/h (32 mph) average including halts

The 17005 / 17006 Hyderabad–Raxaul Express is an Express train belonging to South Central Railway zone that runs between Hyderabad Deccan and Raxaul Junction in India. It is currently being operated with 17005/17006 train numbers on a weekly basis. The train was cancelled due to the closure of the Dhanbad – Chandrapura line. This train is restored on its original route. It will commence its first journey as 17005 Hyderabad Raxaul Express on 4 July 2019 and from Raxaul as 17006 Raxaul Hyderabad Express on 7 July 2019.

== Service ==
The 17005/Hyderabad Deccan–Raxaul Express has an average speed of 50 km/h and covers 2160 km in 43h 30m. The 17006/Raxaul–Hyderabad Deccan Express has an average speed of 49 km/h and covers 2160 km in 43h 45m .

== Route and halts ==
The important halts of the train are;

- Hyderabad Deccan
- Secunderabad Junction
- Kazipet Junction
- Balharshah Junction
- Arjuni
- Gondia Junction
- Durg Junction
- Raipur Junction
- Bilaspur Junction
- Rourkela Junction
- Ranchi Junction
- Muri Junction
- Bokaro Steel City
- Dhanbad Junction
- Jhajha
- Barauni Junction
- Samastipur Junction
- Sitamarhi Junction
- Raxaul Junction

== Coach composition ==
The train has standard LHB rakes with a maximum speed of 130 km/h. The train consists of 22 coaches:

- 2 AC II Tier
- 4 AC III Tier
- 9 Sleeper coaches
- 5 General Unreserved
- 2 EOG cum Luggage Rake

== Traction ==
Both trains are hauled by a Lallaguda Loco Shed-based WAP-7 electric locomotive from Hyderabad to Raxaul and vice versa.

== Rake sharing ==
The train shares its rake with 07265/07266 Hyderabad - Arsikere Special Express.

== See also ==
- Hyderabad Deccan railway station
- Raxaul Junction railway station
- Dhanbad–Chandrapura line
- Jaipur–Hyderabad Weekly Express
