= Howrah–Raxaul Express =

Indian express train

Howrah - Raxaul Express
Overview
- Service type: Express
- Locale: West Bengal, Jharkhand, Bihar
- First service: 28 March 2014
- Current operator: Eastern Railway zone

Route
- Termini: Howrah Junction (HWH); Raxaul Junction (RXL)
- Stops: 17
- Distance travelled: 699 km (434 mi)
- Average journey time: 16h 55m
- Service frequency: Twice in a week (Note: Runs two days in a week for every direction.)
- Train number: 13043/13044

On-board services
- Classes: AC II Tier, AC III Tier, Sleeper Class, General Unreserved
- Seating arrangements: Yes
- Sleeping arrangements: Yes
- Catering facilities: E-Catering
- Observation facilities: Large Windows
- Baggage facilities: Below the seats

Technical
- Rolling stock: 2
- Track gauge: 1,676 mm (5 ft 6 in) (Broad Gauge)
- Operating speed: 43 km/h (27 mph) (Average) n/a (Maximum)

The Howrah - Raxaul Express is an express train belonging to Eastern Railway zone that runs between Howrah Junction and RaxaulJunction in India. It is currently being operated with 13043/13044 train numbers on twice in a week basis.

== Overview ==
It runs from Howrah Junction to Raxaul Junction on Wednesdays and Fridays of every week. In the reverse direction it runs on Thursdays and Saturdays of every week. It connects important stations like Asansol, Jhajha, Barauni, Samastipur, Darbhanga, Sitamarhi. The 13043/Howrah - Raxaul Express has an average speed of 41 km/h and covers 699 km in 16h 55m. The 13044/Raxaul - Howrah Express has an average speed of 44 km/h and covers 699 km in 15h 45m.

== Timing and halts ==
The train departs from Platform #8 of Howrah Junction at 22:50 and arrives in Raxaul Junction at 15:45, the next day. From Raxaul Junction, the train departs at 20:30 and arrives in Howrah Junction at 12:15, the next day.

The important halts of the train are:

- Howrah Junction
- Bandel Junction
- Barddhaman Junction
- Durgapur
- Asansol Junction
- Madhupur Junction
- Jasidih Junction
- Jhajha
- Kiul Junction
- Barauni Junction
- Dalsingh Sarai
- Samastipur Junction
- Darbhanga Junction
- Kamtaul
- Janakpur Road
- Sitamarhi Junction
- Bairgania
- Ghorasahan
- Raxaul Junction

== Coach composite ==
The train consists 15 standard ICF coaches. It does not carry any pantry car:

- 2 AC II Tier Cum III Tiers
- 5 Sleeper Classes
- 6 General (Unreserved)
- 2 Seating (Disabled/Ladies) Cum Luggage Rakes

== Traction ==
The entire journey is covered by an Howrah Loco Shed based electric locomotive WAP 5.

== See also ==
- Howrah Junction railway station
- Raxaul Junction railway station
- Mithila Express
