= Sadbhavna Express (via Sagauli) =

Express train in India

Sadbhawna Express
Overview
- Service type: Express
- First service: 26 February 2014; 12 years ago
- Current operator: Northern Railways

Route
- Termini: Anand Vihar Terminal (ANVT); Raxaul Junction (RXL)
- Stops: 33
- Distance travelled: 1,236 km (768 mi)
- Average journey time: 28 hours 25 mins
- Service frequency: Bi-weekly
- Train number: 14015 / 14016

On-board services
- Classes: AC 2 tier, AC 3 tier, Sleeper Class, General Unreserved
- Seating arrangements: Yes
- Sleeping arrangements: Yes
- Catering facilities: On-board catering E-catering
- Baggage facilities: No

Technical
- Rolling stock: LHB coach
- Track gauge: 1,676 mm (5 ft 6 in)
- Operating speed: 42.93 km/h (27 mph) average including halts

The 14015 / 14016 Sadbhavna Express is an Express train belonging to Northern Railway zone that runs between Anand Vihar Terminal & Raxaul Junction in India.

It operates as train number 14015 from Anand Vihar Terminal to Raxaul Junction and as train number 14016 in the reverse direction serving the states of Delhi, Uttar Pradesh & Bihar.

The word Sadbhavna can mean Goodwill or Bonafide in Devangiri.

== Coaches ==
The 14015/14016 Sadbhavna Express has 1 AC 3 tier, 9 Sleeper Class, 9 General Unreserved & 2 SLR (Seating cum Luggage Rake) ICF coach. It does not carry a pantry car . In addition the 14018/17 Anand Vihar Terminal–Raxaul Sadbhavna Express has an additional AC 2 tier coach.

As is customary with most train services in India, coach composition may be amended at the discretion of Indian Railways depending on demand.

== Service ==
The 14016 Sadbhavna Express covers the distance of 1,236 km (768 mi) in 28 hours 25 mins (43.50 km/h) and in 29 hours 10 mins as 14015 Sadbhavna Express (42.38 km/h).

As the average speed of the train is below 55 km/h (34 mph), as per Indian Railways rules, its fare does not include a superfast surcharge.

== Route and halts ==
- The train runs from Raxaul Junction via Sagauli Junction, Bapudham Motihari, Muzaffarpur Junction, Hajipur, Chhapra Junction, Ballia, Ghazipur City, Varanasi, Sultanpur, Lucknow Charbagh, Shahjahanpur, Moradabad, Hapur, Ghaziabad to Anand Vihar Terminal.

In addition, 14015/14016 Sadbhavna Express also reverses its direction at Sagauli Junction.

== Traction ==
As the route is yet to be fully electrified, a Tughlakabad-based WDP-4B / WDP-4D diesel locomotive hauls the train for its entire journey .

== Rake sharing ==
The train shares its rake with 14013/14014 Sadbhavna Express (via Faizabad).

== Operation ==
- 14015 Sadbhavna Express leaves Anand Vihar Terminal every Friday and Sunday reaching Raxaul the next day.
- 14016 Sadbhavna Express leaves Raxaul Junction every Monday and Wednesday reaching Anand Vihar Terminal the next day.
