= Janakpur Road railway station =

Railway station in Sitamarhi, Bihar, India

General information
- Location: Station Road, Pupri, Janakpur Road, Bihar; India
- Elevation: 61 metres (200 ft)
- System: Indian Railways station
- Owner: Indian Railways
- Operator: East Central
- Lines: Muzaffarpur–Sitamarhi section Muzaffarpur–Gorakhpur line (via Hajipur, Raxaul and Sitamarhi)
- Platforms: 2
- Tracks: 3

Construction
- Structure type: Standard (on ground station)
- Parking: No
- Cycle facilities: No

Other information
- Status: Construction – single-line electrification
- Station code: JNR
- Zone(s): East Central Railway
- Division(s): Samastipur
Location

Janakpur Road railway station (station code: JNR), is a small railway station in Sitamarhi district, of the Indian state of Bihar. It serves Janakpur Road town. The station consists of 2 platforms. It's B category railway station of Samastipur railway division.

The Janakpur Road is well connected to most of the major cities in India like Patna, New Delhi, Mumbai, Kolkata, Ayodhya, Lucknow, Hydrabad and other cities by the railway network.

== Trains ==
- Hyderabad-Raxaul Express
- Kolkata–Sitamarhi Express
- Mithilanchal Express
- Raxaul–Lokmanya Tilak Terminus Karmabhoomi Express
- Howrah–Raxaul Express
- Darbhanga–Anand Vihar Terminal Amrit Bharat Express
- Patliputra - Darbhanga Intercity Express
- Darbhanga - Patliputra intercity express
- Gomti Nagar- Darbhanga Amrit Bharat express
- Darbhanga - Gomti Nagar Amrit Bharat express
- Samastipur–Muzaffarpur DEMU
- Samastipur–Raxaul DEMU
- Darbhanga–Raxaul MEMU
- Darbhanga–Patliputra MEMU
- Darbhanga–Raxaul DEMU
- Raxaul - Jaynagar DEMU
- Jaynagar - Raxaul DEMU
