= Satyagrah Express =

Train in India

Overview
- Service type: Express
- First service: 3 October 1989; 37 years ago
- Current operator: East Central Railway

Route
- Termini: Raxaul Junction (RXL); Anand Vihar Terminal (ANVT)
- Stops: 43
- Distance travelled: 954.5 km (593 mi)
- Average journey time: 24 hours 30 minutes
- Service frequency: Daily
- Train number: 15273 / 15274

On-board services
- Classes: AC first, AC 2 tier, AC 3 tier, Sleeper Class, General Unreserved
- Seating arrangements: Yes
- Sleeping arrangements: Yes
- Catering facilities: E-catering only
- Observation facilities: Large windows
- Baggage facilities: Available
- Other facilities: Below the seats

Technical
- Rolling stock: LHB coach
- Track gauge: 1,676 mm (5 ft 6 in)
- Operating speed: 130 km/h (81 mph) maximum, 40 km/h (25 mph) average including halts.
Route map
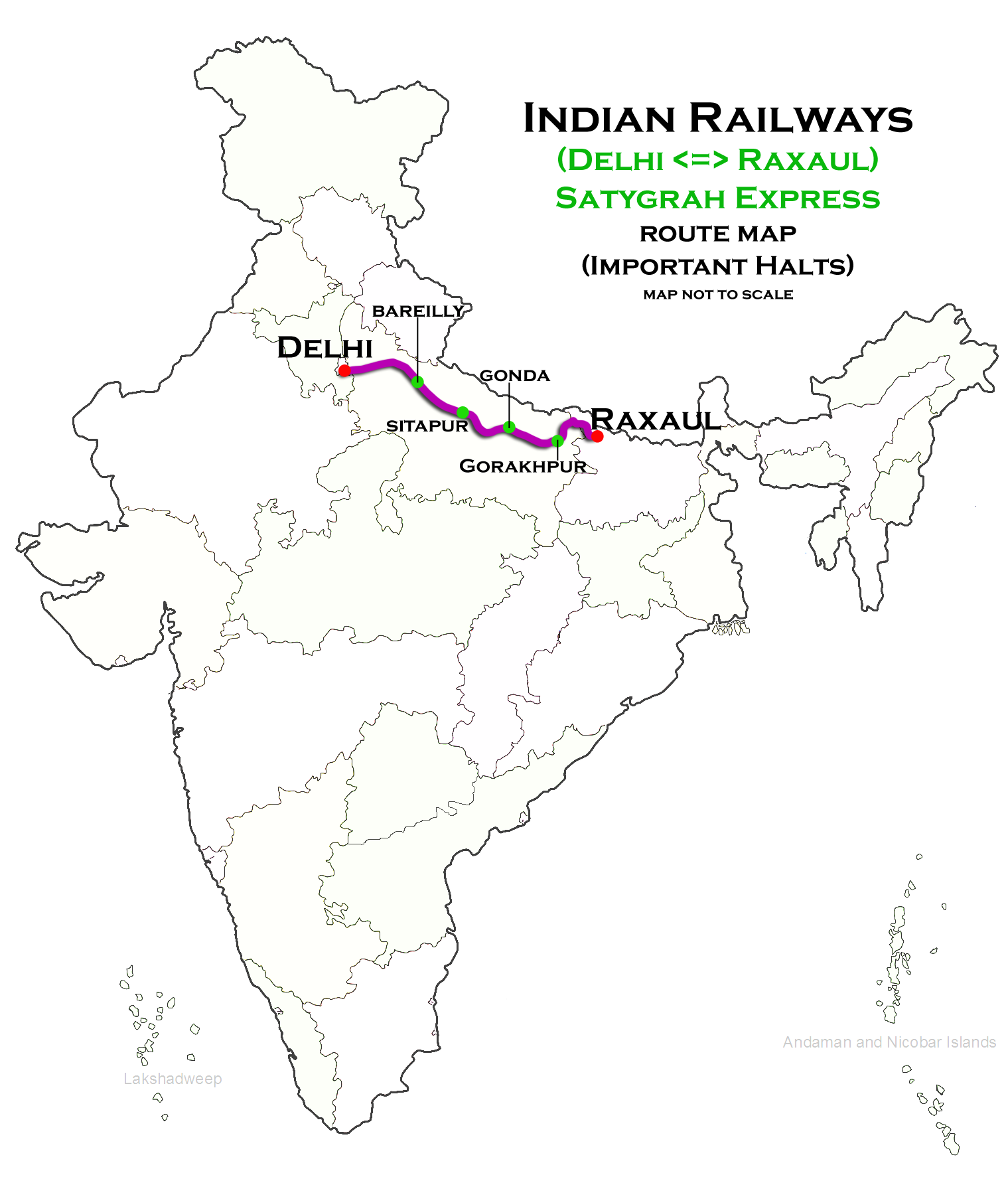

The 15273 / 15274 Satyagrah Express is an Express train belonging to Indian Railways - East Central Railway zone and is one of two trains that run between Raxaul Junction and Anand Vihar Terminal in India. The other train is the Sadbhawna Express.

It operates as train number 15273 from Raxaul Junction to Anand Vihar Terminal and as train number 15274 in the reverse direction serving the states of Delhi, Uttar Pradesh and Bihar.

Satyagrah (/ˌsætɪəˈɡrɑːhɑː/; Sanskrit: सत्याग्रह satyāgraha), loosely translates as "insistence on truth" (satya "truth"; agraha "insistence") or soul force or truth force, is a particular philosophy and practice within the broader overall category generally known as nonviolent resistance or civil resistance. The term satyagraha was coined and developed by Mahatma Gandhi.

== Coaches ==
The 15273 / 74 Raxaul–Anand Vihar Terminal Satyagrah Express has 3 AC First cum AC 2 tier, 8 AC 3 tier, 7 Sleeper Class, 4 General Unreserved and 2 SLR (Seating cum Luggage Rake) Coaches. It does not carry a pantry car .

As is customary with most train services in India, coach composition may be amended at the discretion of Indian Railways depending on demand.

== Service ==
The 15273 Raxaul–Anand Vihar Terminal Satyagrah Express covers a distance of 964 km (599 mi) in 24 hours 15 mins (39.75 km/h) and in 23 hours 30 mins as 15274 Delhi–Raxaul Satyagrah Express (41.02 km/h).

== Routeing ==
The 15273 / 74 Raxaul–Anand Vihar Terminal Satyagrah Express runs from Raxaul Junction via Sagauli Junction, Siswa Bazar, Gorakhpur Junction, Basti, Babhnan, Gonda Junction, Sitapur City, Shahjahanpur, Bareilly, Moradabad, Hapur, Ghaziabad to Anand Vihar Terminal.

== Traction ==
The route is now fully electrified. A Ghaziabad Loco Shed based WAP-7 electric locomotive hauls the train for its entire journey.

== Operation ==
- 15273 Raxaul–Anand Vihar Terminal Satyagrah Express leaves Raxaul Junction on a daily basis at 08:40 AM, reaching Anand Vihar Terminal the next day at 09:10 AM
- 15274 Anand Vihar Terminal–Raxaul Satyagrah Express leaves Anand Vihar Termina] on a daily basis at 05:30 PM, reaching Raxaul Junction the next day at 05:35 PM.

== Incidents ==
- On 21 November 2010, fake currency was recovered from the train.
- On 31 January 2011, some passengers pelted stones at the train.
- On 11 June 2013, two GRP police officers who were on escort duty looted the passengers.
- On 3 November 2013, a man was shot dead on board the train.
- On 21 May 2014, 63 children were rescued from child traffickers who used the train to transport them.

== Sources ==
- "Satyagrah Express - a photo on Flickriver". flickriver.com.
- "Satyagrah Express stoned". The Times of India. 31 January 2011.
- "Quarrel in train leaves 1 dead". The Indian Express. 2 November 2013.
- "2 cops loot train passengers, held". The Indian Express. 10 June 2013.
- "63 Children has been rescued from Old Delhi Railway Station | Bachpan Bachao Andolan". bba.org.in.
- http://concoction.in/IRFCA-Pure-High-Speed-Diesel-Action-Of-Satyagrah-Express-At-Kuchesar-Road-Station/hKaBev1IsmY.html#.U_rt_6MyJXs
- "Rs 1.25 lakh fake notes seized in East Champaran". news.webindia123.com.
- "[IRFCA] Old Train Numbers". IRFCA.
