= Raxaul–Lokmanya Tilak Terminus Karmabhoomi Express =

Raxaul–Mumbai Lokmanya Tilak Terminus Karmabhoomi Express
Overview
- Service type: Superfast
- First service: 25 January 2011; 14 years ago
- Current operator: East Central Railway zone

Route
- Termini: Raxaul Junction; Lokmanya Tilak Terminus
- Stops: 18
- Distance travelled: 2,060 km (1,280 mi)
- Average journey time: 30 hours
- Service frequency: Weekly
- Train number: 12545 / 12546

On-board services
- Class: general unreserved
- Seating arrangements: Yes
- Sleeping arrangements: Yes
- Catering facilities: No

Technical
- Rolling stock: Standard Indian Railways Coaches
- Track gauge: 1,676 mm (5 ft 6 in)
- Operating speed: 55 km/h (34 mph)

The 12545 / 46 Raxaul Junction–Lokmanya Tilak Terminus Karmabhoomi Express is a Superfast express train belonging to Indian Railways East Central Zone that runs between Raxaul Junction and Lokmanya Tilak Terminus in India.

It operates as train number 12545 from Raxaul Junction to Lokmanya Tilak Terminus and as train number 12546 in the reverse direction, serving the states of Jharkhand, Bihar, Uttar Pradesh, Madhya Pradesh & Maharashtra.

== Coaches ==
The 12545 / 46 Raxaul Junction–Lokmanya Tilak Terminus Karmabhoomi Express has 23 general unreserved & two SLR (seating with luggage rake) coaches. It does not carry a pantry car.

As is customary with most train services in India, coach composition may be amended at the discretion of Indian Railways depending on demand.

== Service ==
The 12545 Raxaul Junction–Lokmanya Tilak Terminus Karmabhoomi Express covers the distance of 2,060 km (1,280 mi) in 37 hours 15 mins (55 km/h) and in 37 hours 25 mins as the 12546 Lokmanya Tilak Terminus–Raxaul Junction Karmabhoomi Express (55 km/h).

As the average speed of the train is equal to 55 km/h (34 mph), as per railway rules, but its fare doesn't includes a Superfast surcharge due to its unreserved coaches.

== Routing ==
The 12545 / 46 Raxaul Junction–Lokmanya Tilak Terminus Karmabhoomi Express runs from Raxaul Junction via Samastipur Junction, Patna Junction, Mughalsarai Junction, Cheoki Junction, Jabalpur Junction, Itarsi Junction, Bhusaval Junction, Kalyan Junction to Lokmanya Tilak Terminus.

== Traction ==
As the route is going to electrification, a Samastipur-based WDM-3D diesel locomotive pulls the train up to Itarsi Junction later, an electric locomotive WAP-4 pulls the train to its destination.
