= Lichchavi Express =

Train in India

Overview
- Service type: Express
- Locale: Bihar, Uttar Pradesh & Delhi
- Current operator: Northern Railway

Route
- Termini: Anand Vihar Terminal (ANVT); Sitamarhi Junction (SMI)
- Stops: 35
- Distance travelled: 1,195 km (743 mi)
- Average journey time: 25 hrs 45 mins
- Service frequency: Daily
- Train number: 14005 / 14006

On-board services
- Classes: AC First Class, AC 2 Tier, AC 3 Tier, Sleeper Class, General Unreserved
- Seating arrangements: Yes
- Sleeping arrangements: Yes
- Catering facilities: Available
- Observation facilities: Large windows
- Baggage facilities: No
- Other facilities: Below the seats

Technical
- Rolling stock: LHB coach
- Track gauge: 1,676 mm (5 ft 6 in)
- Operating speed: 130 km/h (81 mph) maximum, 46 km/h (29 mph) average including halts.

The 14005 / 14006 Lichchavi Express is an Express train belonging to Indian Railways – Northern Railway zone that runs between Anand Vihar Terminal and Sitamarhi in India.

It operates as train number 14006 from Anand Vihar Terminal to Sitamarhi and as train number 14005 in the reverse direction, serving the states of Bihar, Uttar Pradesh and Delhi.

It is named after the Licchavis of Vaishali (also Lichchhavi, Lichavi) which were an ancient tribe and dynasty in present day North Bihar.

== Coaches ==
The 14006 / 05 Anand Vihar Terminal–Sitamarhi Lichchavi Express has 1 HA1 composite coach, 2 AC 2 tier, 6 AC 3 tier, 7 Sleeper class, 5 General Unreserved and 1 EOG coaches. In addition, it carries a pantry car.

As is customary with most train services in India, coach composition may be amended at the discretion of Indian Railways depending on demand.

== Service ==
The 14006 Anand Vihar Terminal–Sitamarhi Lichchavi Express covers the distance of 1,193 km (741 mi) in 29 hours 00 mins (41.14 km/h) and in 26 hours 00 mins as 14005 Sitamarhi–Anand Vihar Terminal Lichchavi Express (45.88 km/h).

Mostly, this train runs late and is cancelled in winter.

== Routing ==
The 14006 / 05 Anand Vihar Terminal–Sitamarhi Lichchavi Express runs from Anand Vihar Terminal via Ghaziabad Junction, Khurja Junction, Aligarh Junction,Tundla Junction, Kanpur Central, Allahabad Junction, Varanasi Junction, Bhatni Junction,Mau Junction, Siwan Junction, Chhapra Junction, Hajipur Junction, Muzaffarpur Junction to Sitamarhi .

Some of the important stations during the journey are Aligarh, Kanpur, Allahabad, Varanasi, Dadri, Sonpur, Muzaffarpur.

== Traction ==
As the route is fully electrified, a Ghaziabad Loco Shed-based WAP-7 electric locomotive on its entire journey.

== Operation ==
- 14006 Anand Vihar Terminal–Sitamarhi Lichchavi Express runs from Anand Vihar Terminal on a daily basis reaching Sitamarhi the next day.
- 14005 Sitamarhi–Anand Vihar Terminal Lichchavi Express runs from Sitamarhi on a daily basis reaching Anand Vihar Terminal the next day.

== Accident ==
In an accident due to dense fog on 2 January 2010, the Lichchavi Express collided with the stationary Magadh Express train at the station near the town of Etawah, about 170 miles (270 kilometres) southwest of Lucknow. Ten people, including the driver of one of the trains, were injured.
