= Chandausi Junction railway station =

Railway station in Uttar Pradesh, India

Chandausi railway station

General information
- Location: State Highway 43, Chandausi, Uttar Pradesh; India
- Coordinates: 28°27′31″N 78°46′49″E
- Elevation: 193 metres (633 ft)
- System: Indian Railways junction station
- Owner: Indian Railways
- Operator: Northern Railway
- Lines: Lucknow–Moradabad line / Chandausi loop Chandausi–Aligarh line
- Platforms: 3

Construction
- Structure type: At grade
- Parking: Yes
- Cycle facilities: No

Other information
- Status: Functioning
- Station code: CH
- Zone(s): Northern Railway
- Division(s): Moradabad

History
- Opened: 1872

Services
Preceding station	Indian Railways	Following station
Gumthal towards ?	Northern Railway zone Chandausi loop	Sisarka towards ?
Terminus	Northern Railway zone Aligarh–Chandausi branch line	Bahjoi towards ?
Location
- Location within Uttar Pradesh Location within India

Chandausi railway station is located in Sambhal district in the Indian state of Uttar Pradesh and serves Chandausi. Chandausi Junction railway station lies on the Aligarh–Bareilly rail route. It is served by the Northern Railways. The main train connections include Dadar–Bareilly Express, Dehradun–Allahabad Link Express, Muzaffarpur–Delhi Sadbhavana Express and Sultanpur–Delhi Sadbhawna Express

== History ==
After connecting Varanasi with Lucknow, the Oudh and Rohilkhand Railway started working west of Lucknow and it reached Bareilly in 1873. A line connecting Moradabad to Chandausi was also built in 1872 and it was continued up to Bareilly in 1873. The Bareilly–Moradabad chord was completed in 1894. The former main line became Chandausi Loop and the one via Rampur became the main line. It was extended to Shahranpur in 1886. A branch line to Aligarh was opened in 1894.

== Electrification ==
The survey for railway electrification of the Moradabad–Aligarh line, along with the Chandausi–Bareilly sector, was sanctioned in the budget for 2012–13.
