= Shahjahanpur Junction railway station =

Railway station in Uttar Pradesh, India

Shahjahanpur Junction
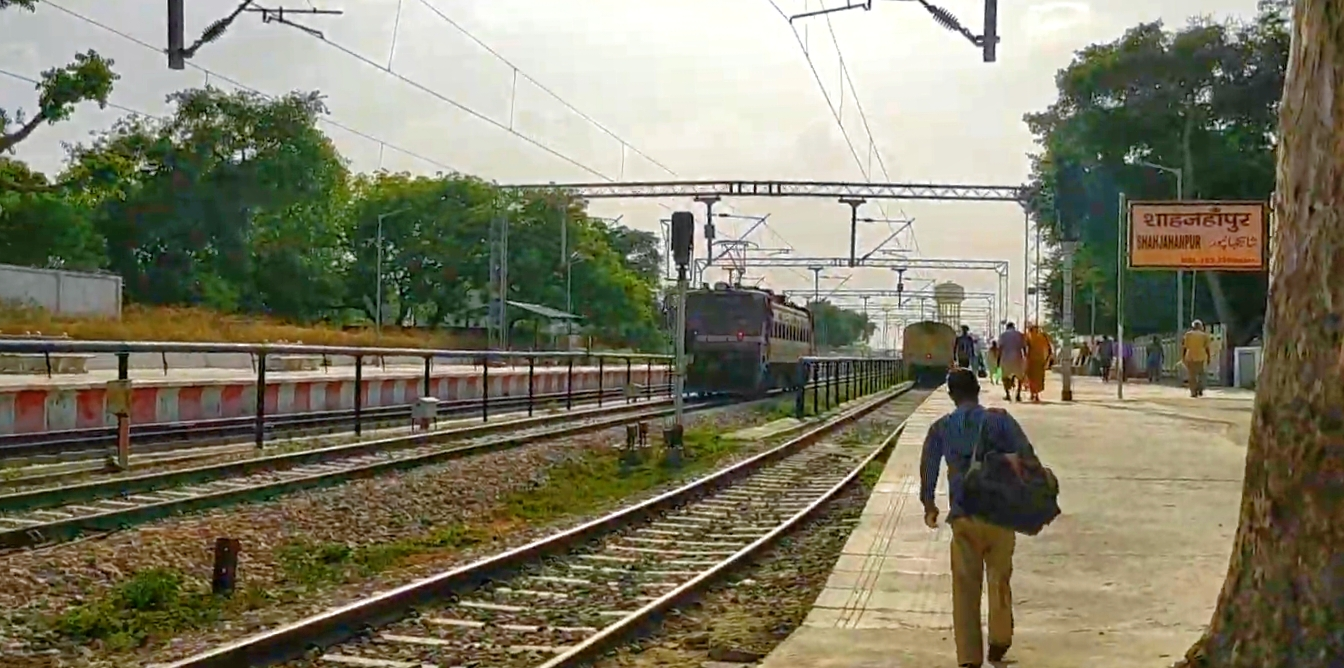
- Shahjahanpur Junction

General information
- Location: Shahjahanpur, Uttar Pradesh; India
- Coordinates: 27.5337°N 79.5416°E
- System: Indian Railways station
- Owner: Indian Railways
- Operator: Northern Railway
- Lines: Lucknow–Moradabad line, Shahjahanpur–Pilibhit line
- Platforms: 6
- Tracks: 7
- Connections: Auto stand

Construction
- Structure type: At grade
- Parking: Yes
- Cycle facilities: Yes

Other information
- Status: Functioning
- Station code: SPN
- Zone(s): Northern Railway
- Division(s): Moradabad

History
- Opened: 1873; 153 years ago

Passengers
- 50,000 Daily
Location
- Location within India Location within Uttar Pradesh

Shahjahanpur Junction Railway Station (station code SPN) is a main railway station in Shahjahanpur district in the Western Uttar Pradesh of India. It is neighbored by another major station, Lucknow Junction under the North-Eastern Railway region.
