= Janakpur Road =

- town
- Location in Bihar, India
- Coordinates: 26°29′N 85°43′E
- Country: India
- State: Bihar
- District: Sitamarhi

Population (2011)
  - Total: 15,129

Languages
  - Official: Hindi, Maithili
- Time zone: UTC+5:30 (IST)
- PIN: 843320
- Telephone code: 06228
- ISO 3166 code: IN-BR

Janakpur Road is a town and a notified area in Sitamarhi district in the Indian state of Bihar.

== Demographics ==
As of 2011 India census, Janakpur Road had a population of 15,129. Males constitute 53% of the population and females 47%. Janakpur Road has an average literacy rate of 89.14%, higher than the national average of 74.04%: male literacy is 80%, and female literacy is 65.46%. In Janakpur Road, 17% of the population is under 0 — 6 years of age.

The town is noted for the famous Baba Nageshwarnath Temple, dedicated to Lord Shiva

== Transport ==
Pupri, an agro-based industrial town, is located in Sitamarhi District in Bihar. It is around 30 km south-east of Sitamarhi.

Janaki Temple, dedicated to Goddess Sita, is a nearby attraction. The town is directly connected with Nanpura (8 km south), Bajpatti (17 km north-west) and Jaynagar (34 km north-east) by road. Madhubani (south-east), Benipatti (north-west) and Sitamarhi (north-west) are ideal tourist destinations. Nearest airport is Darbhanga Airport. Janakpur Road Railway Station, of Eastern Railways, serves this town.
