= Sugauli, Bihar =

Sugauli
- City
- Sagauli
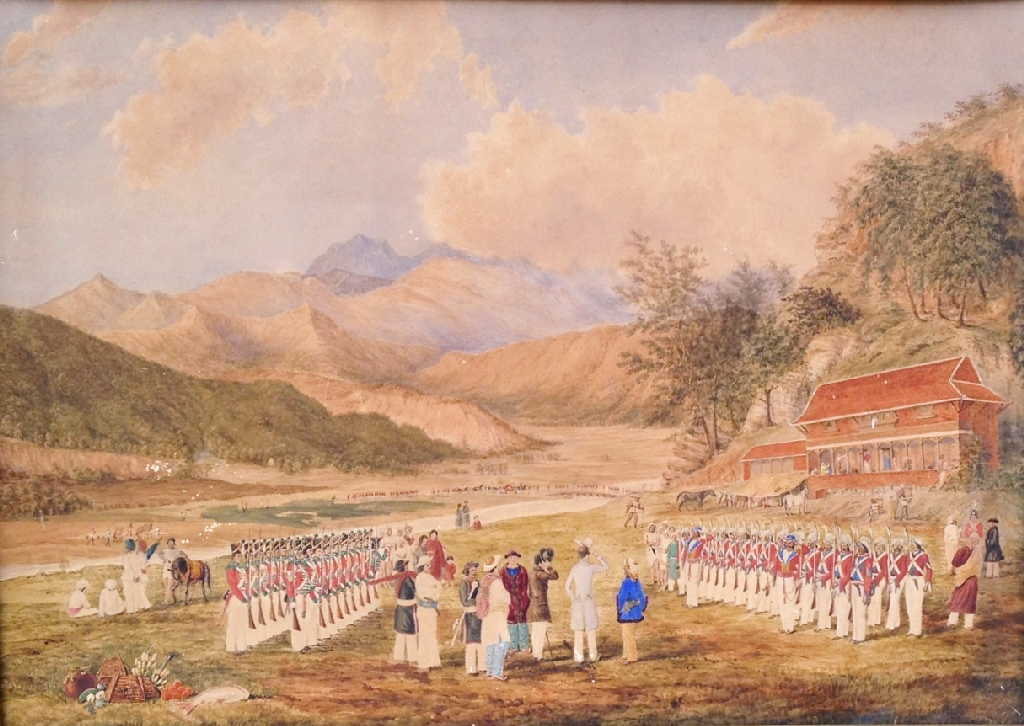
- Nickname: City of sugauli treaty
- Location in Bihar, India
- Coordinates: 26°45′44.488″N 84°44′27.349″E
- Country: India
- State: Bihar
- District: Purvi Champaran
- Founder: Guru Gajraj Mishra

Government
  - Type: Nagar panchayat
  - Body: Nagar panchayat Sugauli

Area
  - Urban: 19.25 km^{2} (7.43 sq mi)
  - Rural: 149.46 km^{2} (57.71 sq mi)
- Elevation: 75 m (246 ft)

Population (2011)
  - Urban: 38,815
  - Rural: 191,992

Languages
  - Official: Bhojpuri, Hindi
- Time zone: UTC+5:30 (IST)
- Postal code: 845456
- ISO 3166 code: IN-BR
- Vehicle registration: BR05
- Lok Sabha constituency: Paschim Champaran
- Vidhan Sabha constituency: Sugauli
- Website: eastchamparan.bih.nic.in

Sugauli is a city and a notified area in East Champaran district in the Indian state of Bihar. Best known for Treaty of Sagauli, 1816 between the British and Gurkhas and role played in the Satyagraha Movement of Mahatma Gandhi, it is also the setting for Rudyard Kipling's story "Rikki-Tikki-Tavi" (spelled as "Segowlee" in said story), and the place where The Treaty of Sagauli was signed with Nepal in 1816.

== Demographics ==
As of 2011 India census, Sugauli town had a population of 38,815. Sugauli is a Nagar Panchayat city in district of Purbi Champaran, Bihar. The Sugauli city is divided into 20 wards for which elections are held every 5 years. The Sugauli Nagar Panchayat has population of 38,815 of which 20,584 are males while 18,231 are females as per report released by Census India 2011. The population of children aged 0–6 is 7810 which is 20.12% of total population of Sugauli (NP). In Sugauli Nagar Panchayat, the female sex ratio is 886 against state average of 918. Moreover, the child sex ratio in Sugauli is around 937 compared to Bihar state average of 935. literacy rate of Sugauli city is 64.90% higher than the state average of 61.80%. In Sugauli, male literacy is around 73.45% while the female literacy rate is 55.10%. Sugauli Nagar Panchayat has total administration over 7,480 houses to which it supplies basic amenities like water and sewerage. It is also authorized to build roads within Nagar Panchayat limits and impose taxes on properties coming under its jurisdiction.

== History ==
Sugauli has great role in India's independence war. Sugauli is the part of SATYAGRAHA movement what GANDHI JI has started from the Champaran, and that movement inspired a lot of youth at that time to contribute for the nation and few of them were Janardan Pandey and Babulal Mishra from Sugauli, Late Pt. Tuni jha, Laxmi Narayan Jha, Upendra Jha, Ramesh Chandra Jha, Sukham Mishra from Phulwaria, Yamuna kant Jha from Sugaon bhup narayan singh karamwa. Sugauli is also known for Sugauli Treaty, which was signed between British India and Nepal in March 1816.

== Panchayats ==
There are 16 Gram Panchayats in sugauli block.

- Phulwaria
- North Sugaon
- South Sugaon
- North Sripur
- South Sripur
- Bhataha
- Bhargawan
- North Chhapra Bahas
- South Chhapra Bahas
- Sukul Pakar
- North Mansingha
- South Mansingha
- Mali
- Pajiarwa
- Baghi
- Karmawa Raghunathpur

== Villages ==
There are many villages around 100 in Sugauli block. Some of important villages are as follows:

Chhapwa: It connects Motihari with Bettiah via NH 28, Sugaon : Earlier it was a capital of Tirhut region (as per Gazetteer), Bhathan, Phulwaria, Panjiyarwa, Karmwa and many small villages.

List of Villages in Sugauli 1. Baghi 2. Bahuari 3. Baksa 4. Baluwa Tikulia 5. Baudha 6. Bhargawan 7. Bhataha 8. Bhawanipur 9. Biguia 10. Chainpur 11. Chhagraha 12. Chhapra Bahas 13. Chiljhapti Urf Juajat 14. Dewdatwa 15. Dumdumwa 16. Gorgawan 17. Gurhaurf Koraia 18. Hathiahiya 19. Kaithwalia 20. Khonra 21. Khutiharwa 22. Lal Parsa 23. Ledihar 24. Madhopur Bahuarwa Urf Danditol 25. Madhopurkaramwa 26. Madhopurnankar 27. Madhopurnizamat 28. Mali 29. Mansingha 30. Muda Chhapra 31. Muswa 32. Pachbhirwa 33. Pajiarwa 34. Parsauna 35. Parsurampur 36. Phulwaria 37. Phulwaria Ojha 38. Raghunathpur 39. Roypatti 40. Sapaha 41. Shampur 42. Siripur 43. Sirkhandi 44. Suganw 45. Sukul Pakar Urf Belwalia 46. Tola Dharampur 47. Unwa Birit

== Transport ==
Railway

Sugauli is connected to different cities of India through railways. Sagauli Junction railway station is the main railway station serving the city. Direct trains are available to all the major destinations across India like Patna, Delhi, Mumbai, Kolkata, Guwahati, Ahemdabad, Lucknow, Jaipur, Jammu & Katra, etc.

Roadway

National Highway 727, 139W, 28B, AH42 and State Highway 54 passes through the city.

The National Highway Authority of India (NHAI) has notified a new Patna-Bettiah road as National Highway 139W, setting the state for construction of a high-quality four-lane road between the two towns that would reduce the distance between them to 167 kilometres from the current 200-odd km and travel time to around two hours.

Tola San Saraiyan new town aided village. The new Gopalganj-Bettiah Road passed through this new town aided village. Through this new road a distance of 60 km (37 mi) become shorten for Gopalganj-Bettiah.

=== Airway ===
The nearest airport is Kushinagar International Airport which is about 117 km (71 mi) from Sugauli. The nearest airport in bihar is Jay Prakash Narayan International Airport located in Patna which is about 200 km (120 mi) via Muzaffarpur and 177 km (110 mi) via areraj.

== Also ==
- Sugauli Treaty
- Ramesh Chandra Jha
- Anuranjan Jha
