= Raxaul Junction railway station =

Railway station in East Champaran, Bihar, India

Raxaul Junction
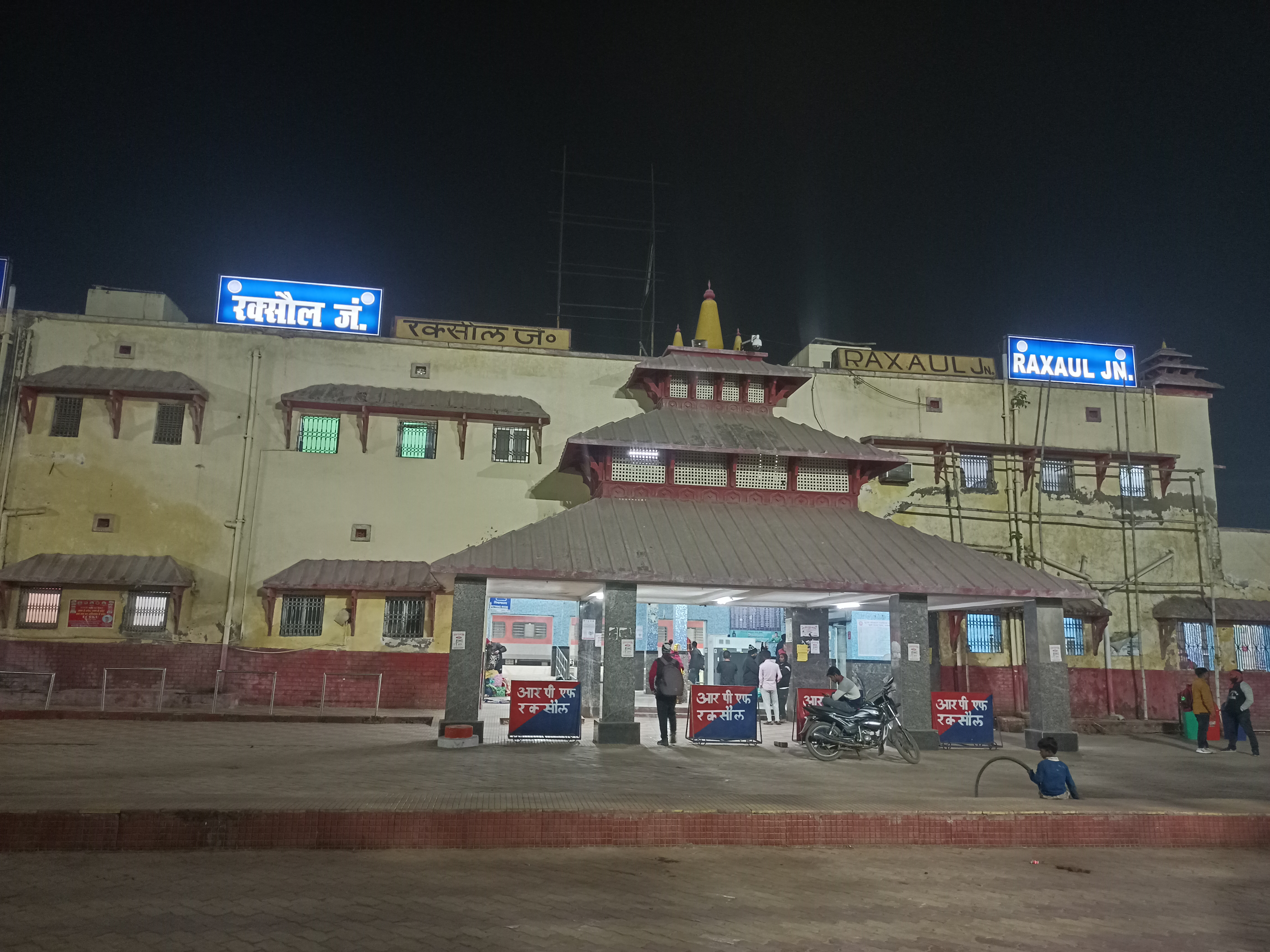

General information
- Location: Station Road, Raxaul, near Birgunj a border city of Nepal. East Champaran, Bihar; India
- Coordinates: 26.9868°N 84.8447°E
- Elevation: 88 metres (289 ft)
- System: Indian Railways station
- Owner: Indian Railways
- Operator: East Central Railway zone
- Lines: Barauni–Raxaul and Jainagar Lines; Raxaul–Sagauli line; Raxaul–Narkatiaganj line; Raxaul–Birgunj (Inland Container Depot)
- Platforms: 3
- Tracks: 6
- Connections: Auto stand

Construction
- Structure type: Standard (on-ground station)
- Parking: Yes
- Cycle facilities: No

Other information
- Status: Functioning
- Station code: RXL
- Zone(s): East Central Railway zone
- Division(s): Samastipur

History
- Opened: 1927
Location
- Location within India Location within Bihar

Raxaul Junction railway station (station code: RXL), is a main railway station in East Champaran district, Bihar. It serves Raxaul city and also as gateway to Nepal as the most important station on the Indo-Nepal border. The station consists of three platforms.

== History ==
Raxaul–Amlekhganj line was constructed in 1927. It was Nepal's first railway line. Narrow-gauge line of 48 km was closed in 1965 as new line was constructed to Inland Container Depot at Sirsiya near Birgunj and was opened in 2005.

== Lines and location ==
The station is situated on the Delhi–Gorakhpur–Raxaul–Muzaffarpur–Kolkata lines. Earlier, all tracks were metre gauge but most have been converted to 1,676 mm (5 ft 6 in) broad gauge. After the completion of the gauge conversion from Darbhanga to Raxaul via Sitamarhi, another broad-gauge route to Raxaul became available from March 2014.

== Major trains ==
Some of the important trains that runs from Raxaul are :

- Satyagrah_Express
- Howrah-Raxaul_Express
- Mithila Express
- Sadbhavna Express
- Hyderabad–Raxaul Express
- Shri Mata Vaishno Devi Katra - Kamakhya Express

== See also ==
- Bhikhna Thori railway station
