= Muzaffarpur Junction railway station =

Railway station in Muzaffarpur, Bihar, India

MUZAFFARPUR JUNCTION

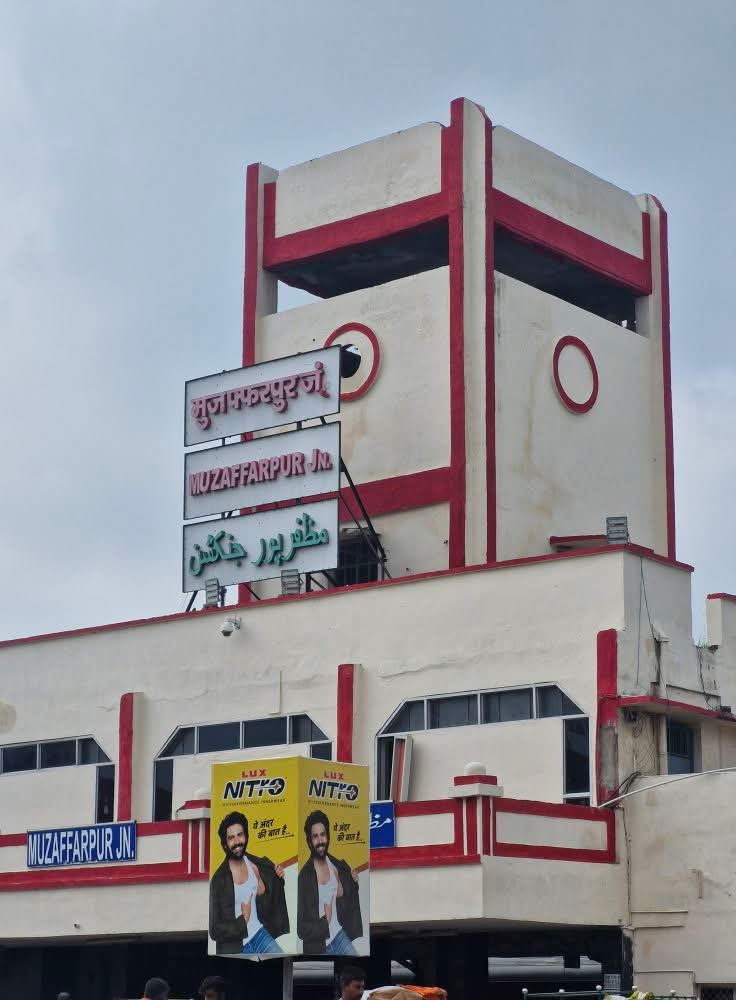
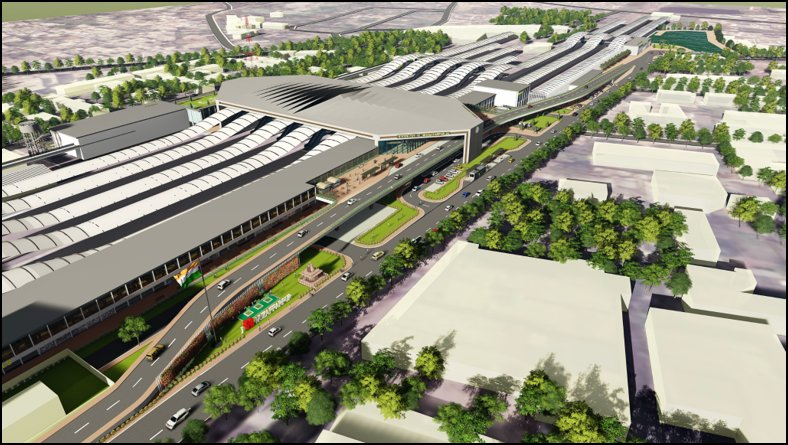
- The main entrance of the station Muzaffarpur Junction After Redevlopment 3D Design (U/C) (Proposed)

General information
- Location: Muzaffarpur, Bihar; India
- Coordinates: 26.1222°N 85.3779°E
- Elevation: 57 metres (187 ft)
- Owner: East Central Railway zone
- Operator: Indian Railways
- Lines: Barauni–Raxaul and Jainagar Lines; Barauni–Gorakhpur line Samastipur–Muzaffarpur section Muzaffarpur–Hajipur section Muzaffarpur–Gorakhpur main line
- Platforms: 8 (4 platform proposed)
- Tracks: 26
- Connections: City bus, auto rickshaw, taxi, cab service

Construction
- Structure type: Standard (on ground station)
- Parking: Available
- Cycle facilities: Available
- Architectural style: Modern (after Redevelopment)

Other information
- Status: Functioning
- Station code: MFP
- Zone(s): East Central Railway zone
- Division(s): Samastipur

History
- Opened: 1884; 142 years ago
- Rebuilt: 2024 (under-construction) under Amrit Bharat Station Scheme
- Electrified: 2010; 16 years ago, 25 kV AC 50 Hz
- Former names: East Indian Railway

Passengers
- ▲357,075 per day
- Rank: Top 42nd booking stations under Indian Railways
Location
- Location within Bihar Location within India
- Interactive map

Muzaffarpur Junction railway station , (Note: मुजफ्फरपुर जंक्शन रेलवे स्टेशन) station code MFP, is an A1 category railway station in the SPJ Division of ECR. Muzaffarpur Junction is located in Muzaffarpur city, in the Indian state of Bihar.

Muzaffarpur Junction holds a pivotal place in the East Central Railway Zone of Indian Railways, serving as a major railway hub in North Bihar. The station offers extensive rail connectivity, with daily and weekly trains available to major cities: New Delhi, Patna, Secunderabad, Kolkata, Varanasi, Ahmedabad, Mumbai, Amritsar, Pune, Chennai, Bangalore, Lucknow, Kanpur, Prayagraj, Howrah, Ujjain, Chennai, Howrah, Goa, Hubballi, Jammu, Bhopal, Chandigarh.

== History ==
Muzaffarpur Junction was established in 1875 during the British colonial period as part of the expansion of railways in the Tirhut region of North Bihar. The station was developed under the Tirhut State Railway to improve connectivity between North Bihar, Bengal, and areas close to the Nepal border.

In the late 19th and early 20th centuries Muzaffarpur emerged as an important commercial center, particularly for the trade of litchi, sugarcane, indigo, and other agricultural products. The railway station played a key role in transporting these goods to major cities such as Calcutta (now Kolkata) and Patna, supporting regional economic growth.

With the expansion of broad-gauge railways in eastern India, the main railway line from the North-East (via Bengal and Assam) was extended through Katihar–Samastipur, connecting it to Muzaffarpur. This development significantly enhanced Muzaffarpur's role as a junction station, linking North-East India with North and Central India.

After India's independence in 1947, Muzaffarpur Junction became part of Indian Railways and continued to grow in importance. Following the reorganization of railway zones, the station was placed under the East Central Railway zone.

== Trains ==
Muzaffarpur Junction is one of the most important and busiest railway stations in Bihar, with 155–160 trains halting daily, in addition to 14 trains originating and 14 trains terminating here:

S.No	Train Name	Train Number
🟢 Daily
1	Sapt Kranti Superfast Express	12557 / 12558
2	Bhagalpur–Muzaffarpur Jan Sewa Express	13419 / 13420
🔵 Bi-Weekly
3	Porbandar–Muzaffarpur Express	19269 / 19270
4	Muzaffarpur Prayagraj Bapudham Express	14111 / 14112
🟣 Weekly
5	Muzaffarpur - Hadapsar (Pune) AC Express	15589 / 15590
6	Muzaffarpur–Charlapalli Amrit Bharat Express	15294 / 15293
7	Muzaffarpur–Anand Vihar Garib Rath Express	12111 / 12112
8	Tirhut Express	13157 / 13158
9	Muzaffarpur–Dehradun Express	15001 / 15002
10	Muzaffarpur–SMVT Bengaluru Weekly Express	15227 / 15228
11	Surat–Muzaffarpur Express	19053 / 19054
12	Valsad–Muzaffarpur Express	19051 / 19052
13	Howrah–Muzaffarpur Jan Sadharan Express	15271 / 15272
14	Muzaffarpur–Sabarmati Jan Sadharan Express	15269 / 15270

Some High-Priority Trains at Muzaffarpur Junction Railway Station:

- Sapt Kranti Express
- Gorakhpur–Patliputra Vande Bharat Express
- Dibrugarh Rajdhani Express
- Mumbai LTT–Saharsa Amrit Bharat Express
- Swatantra Senani Superfast Express.
- Jogbani–Danapur Vande Bharat Express

== Redevelopment ==
Muzaffarpur Junction, the largest railway station in the Samastipur Division and North Bihar in terms of passenger footfall and coaching revenue, is undergoing a major ₹4420.1 million redevelopment under the Amrit Bharat Station Scheme. .

=== Project Highlights ===
Redevelopment Project Details 🚉
Parameter	Details
Passenger Footfall 👥	Projected: 76,730 nos/day (PHT – 7,673 nos)
Station Building 🏢	•Main Station Building (North, G+3), Built-up Area: 12,399 sqm • Terminal Building (South, G+2), Built-up Area: 2,562 sqm • Departure Terminal (South, G+3), Built-up Area: 2,857 sqm • Combined Terminal Building (G+2)
Concourse 🏟️	Area: 3,970 sqm Roof Size: 42.6 m × 36 m + 48.6 m × 72 m
FOBs 🌉	02 Nos – 18 m wide & 6 m wide
Waiting Area ⏳	Seating Capacity: 2,200 seats
Escalators ⬆️⬇️	19 Nos
Lifts 🛗	32 Nos
Ticket Counters 🎟️	38 Nos
Project Cost 💰	₹ 4424.7 million
EPC Contractor 🏗️	M/s Ramkripal Singh Construction Private Limited

=== 3D Design ===
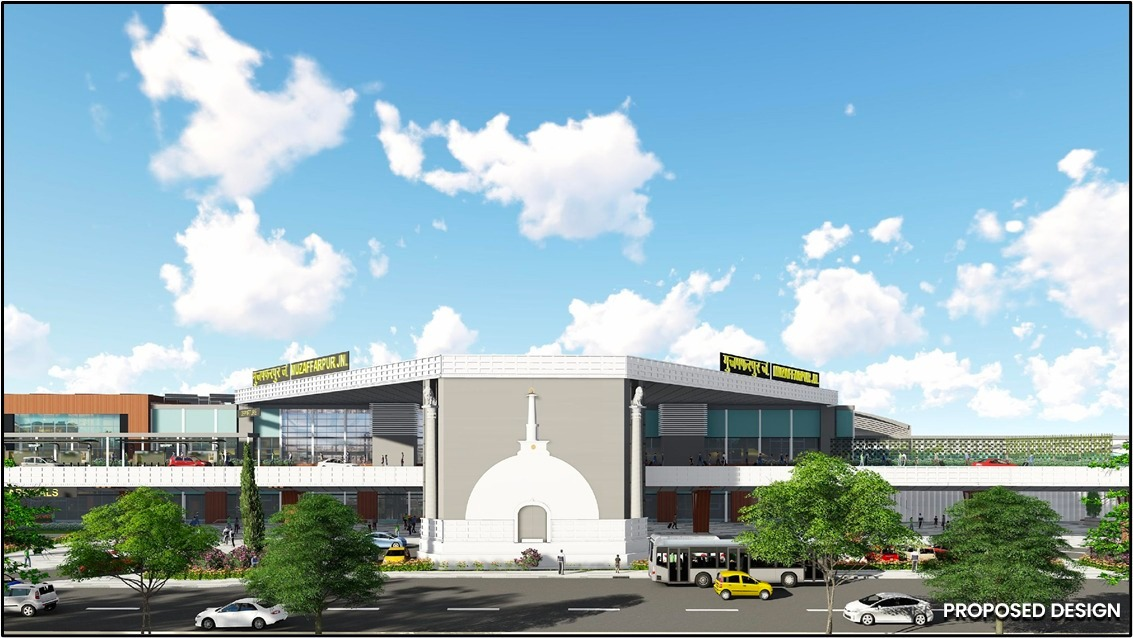
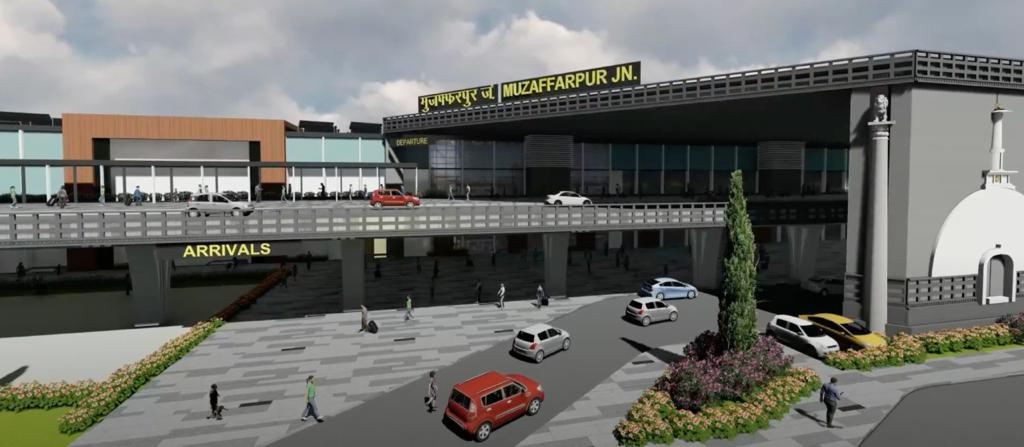
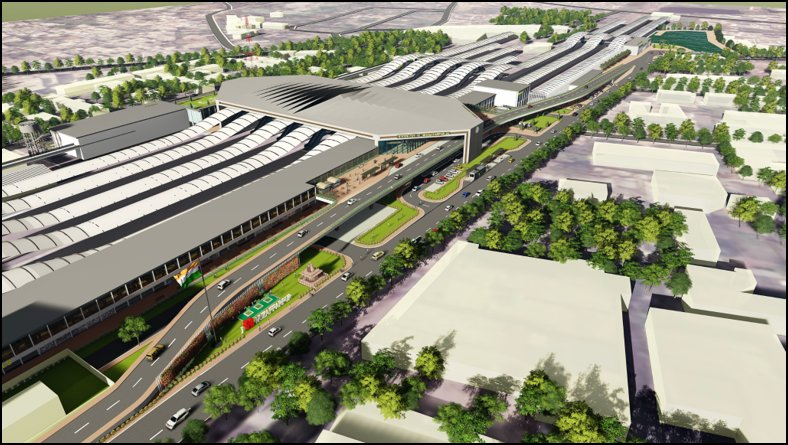

== Passenger movement ==
Muzaffarpur Junction is among the top 50 booking stations of Indian Railways. In 2025, it recorded the highest ticket sales through Automatic Ticket Vending Machines (ATVMs) in the East Central Railway (ECR) zone.

=== Revenue and ranking ===
Financial Year	Revenue	Rank in ECR
2023–24	₹275 crore	2nd
2024–25	₹313.73 crore	3rd
2025–26	Not disclosed	2nd

== Platforms ==
Muzaffarpur Junction currently has eight platforms, interconnected by three-foot overbridges, along with two washing pit lines. Under the redevelopment project, four new platforms are proposed to be constructed.

Platform usage at Muzaffarpur Junction
Platform	Usage
1	Primarily used for halting trains arriving from Hajipur, Bapudham Motihari and Sitamarhi.
2–3	Reserved for high-priority trains halting at Muzaffarpur Junction, mainly from the Samastipur Junction side.
4–5	Used for trains originating and terminating at Muzaffarpur Junction, as well as for halting special trains.
6–8	Generally dedicated to Vande Bharat Train, DEMU and MEMU trains (up to 8 coaches) bound for Hajipur, Sitamarhi, Narkatiaganj and Raxaul.

== Administrative Transfer ==
Muzaffarpur Junction had been under the jurisdiction of the Sonpur railway division since 1951. The Sonpur division was originally a part of the North Eastern Railway zone at the time of its establishment in 1951. Following the formation of East Central Railway zone (ECR) in 2001, the Sonpur division was merged into ECR.

Since India's independence, Muzaffarpur Junction remained a part of the Sonpur division. However, after 74 years, its administrative control was changed. Effective from 1 September 2025, Muzaffarpur Junction was transferred from Sonpur division to Samastipur railway division.

== Capacity Expansion ==
On 26 December 2025, the Ministry of Railways announced a plan to double the originating train capacity of 48 major Indian cities by 2030 to address rising passenger demand. The initiative includes expansion of existing terminals, creation of new terminals, enhancement of maintenance facilities, and upgrades to signaling and track infrastructure.

Muzaffarpur is included in the programme, with its terminal and adjoining rail sections identified for potential capacity augmentation to reduce congestion and improve regional connectivity.

== New Muzaffarpur Terminal ==
Turki Model Railway Station is a proposed railway infrastructure project under the Sonpur railway division of ECR in Bihar, India. The Sonpur Division had been planning a new Muzaffarpur terminal since 2012, but the proposal could not be implemented at that time. The project gained momentum after Muzaffarpur Junction was transferred to the Samastipur railway division.

=== Background ===
After the transfer of Muzaffarpur Junction to the Samastipur Division, the Sonpur Division initiated plans to develop a new terminal to serve the Tirhut Region . The proposed station is planned near Turki, along the Turki–Silaut bypass railway line.

=== Project details ===
The project includes the development of a coaching depot, coaching terminal, and other supporting railway infrastructure. A railway residential colony is also proposed as part of the development.

The station is planned along the Turki–Silaut bypass railway line. The proposed infrastructure at the station includes:

- Two platform lines with sheds
- Two inspection lines
- Three sick lines for maintenance of defective coaches
- One washing pit line for coach cleaning
- Six stabling lines with dedicated shunting necks at both ends.

=== Survey and planning ===
The survey work is being carried out by Bhaskaram Jyotish Anusandhan Private Limited, a Gujarat-based company, under the supervision of officials from the Sonpur Division. As of now, the project remains in the survey and planning stage.

== Muzaffarpur Junction CD ==
Muzaffarpur (MFP) Coaching Depot has a total of 210 coaches, all of which are of LHB type. There are no ICF coaches at this depot. Out of the total, 82 are LHB AC coaches and 128 are LHB non-AC coaches.

The depot has two examination pits for routine inspections and maintenance. Pit No. 1 is 549.5 meters long and can accommodate 24 coaches, while Pit No. 2 is 496 meters long and can hold 22 coaches.

Muzaffarpur also has a covered sick line shed measuring 70 meters by 15 meters, which can handle up to 6 coaches at a time. There is no uncovered shed, and the depot has a total of two lines for sick line operations.

=== Primary Examination Trains at MFP ===
Sl. no.	Train category	Train no.	From	To	Coach type	Days of operation
1	Mail/Express	12557/12558	MFP	ANVT	LHB	Daily
2	Mail/Express	15228/15227	MFP	SMVB	LHB	Weekly
3	Mail/Express	15272/15271	MFP	HWH	LHB	Weekly
4	Mail/Express	15269/15270	MFP	Sabarmati	LHB	Weekly
5	Amrit Bharat Mail/Express	15293/15294	MFP	CHZ	LHB	Weekly
6	Amrit Bharat Mail/Express	15568/15567	MFP	ANVT	LHB	Twice a week
7	Mail/Express	15589/15590	MFP	HDP	LHB	Monday

=== Secondary Examination M/Exp Trains at MFP ===
Sl. no.	Train category	Train no.	From	To	Coach type
1	Express	15001/15002	MFP	Dehradun	LHB
2	Express	19269/19270	MFP	Porbandar	LHB
3	Express	19053/19054	MFP	Surat	LHB
4	Express	19051/19052	MFP	Valsad	LHB

=== Watering nominated & Platform Return trains at MFP ===
Sl. no.	Train no.	Total coaches	From	To	Arrival time	Departure time	Days of operation	Average maintenance time	Remarks
1	13420/13419	17	MFP	Bhagalpur	20:40	23:05	Daily	90 minutes	ICF
2	13157/13158	21	MFP	Kolkata	08:55	14:40	Wednesday	90 minutes	LHB
3	14111/14112	17	MFP	Prayagraj	18:10	19:30	Monday, Wednesday	60 minutes	LHB
4	12211/12212	18	MFP	Anvt	18:10	15:15	Friday	90 minutes	LHB
5	19051/19052	22	MFP	Valsad	06:50	20:10	Monday	90 minutes	LHB

== Railway lines ==
Rail section	Length	Gauge / Track / Electrification	Stations
Muzaffarpur–Hajipur section	53.83 km	Broad gauge / Double line / Electrified	Muzaffarpur Junction; Ram Dayalu Nagar; Turki; Kurhani; Goraul; Benipatti Pirapur; Bhagwanpur; Bithauli; Sarai; Ghoswar; Hajipur Junction
Samastipur–Muzaffarpur section	52.8 km	Broad gauge / Double line / Electrified	Samastipur Junction; Karpurigram; Khudiram Bose Pusa; Vishnupur Bathua Halt; Dubaha; Dholi; Siho; Silaut; Narayanpur Anant; Muzaffarpur Junction
Muzaffarpur–Sitamarhi section	65 km	Broad gauge / Single line / Electrified	Muzaffarpur Junction; Jubbasahani; Paramjeevar Tarajeevar; Benipurgram Halt; New Runnisaidpur Halt; Runnisaidpur; Garha railway station; Dumra; Bhisa Halt; Sitamarhi Junction
Muzaffarpur–Gorakhpur main line	309.72 km	Broad gauge / Electrified	Muzaffarpur Junction; Motipur; Mehsi; Chakia; Bapudham Motihari; Sagauli Junction; Bettiah; Narkatiaganj Junction; Harinagar; Valmikinagar Road; Kaptanganj Junction; Gorakhpur Junction
Muzaffarpur – Darbhanga new line (Proposed)	67.4 km	Broad gauge / Single line / Electrified (Proposed)	NA
Muzaffarpur – Janakpur Road new line (Proposed)	90 km	Broad gauge / Single line / Electrified (Proposed)	NA
Muzaffarpur – Chhapra new line (Proposed)	78 km	Broad gauge / Single line / Electrified (Proposed)	NA

== Accidents and incidents ==
- 27 November 2013 – A road overbridge collapsed onto a goods train near Maripur, injuring ten people and damaging two wagons. Rail traffic was severely disrupted for over a day.
- 22 January 2024 – A maintenance vehicle derailed on the Muzaffarpur–Bapudham line, affecting 19 trains (three canceled, six short-terminated, ten rerouted).
- 16 June 2025 – A goods train derailed near the RRI section of Muzaffarpur Junction after unloading ballast. No injuries were reported; operations were restored following deployment of ART and security teams.
- September 2024 – The engine of a Muzaffarpur–Pune special train derailed, causing delays but no casualties.

== See also ==
- Muzaffarpur Metro
- Ram Dayalu Nagar railway station
- Dholi railway station
- Patna Junction
- Narayanpur Anant railway station
- Muzaffarpur

== Gallery ==
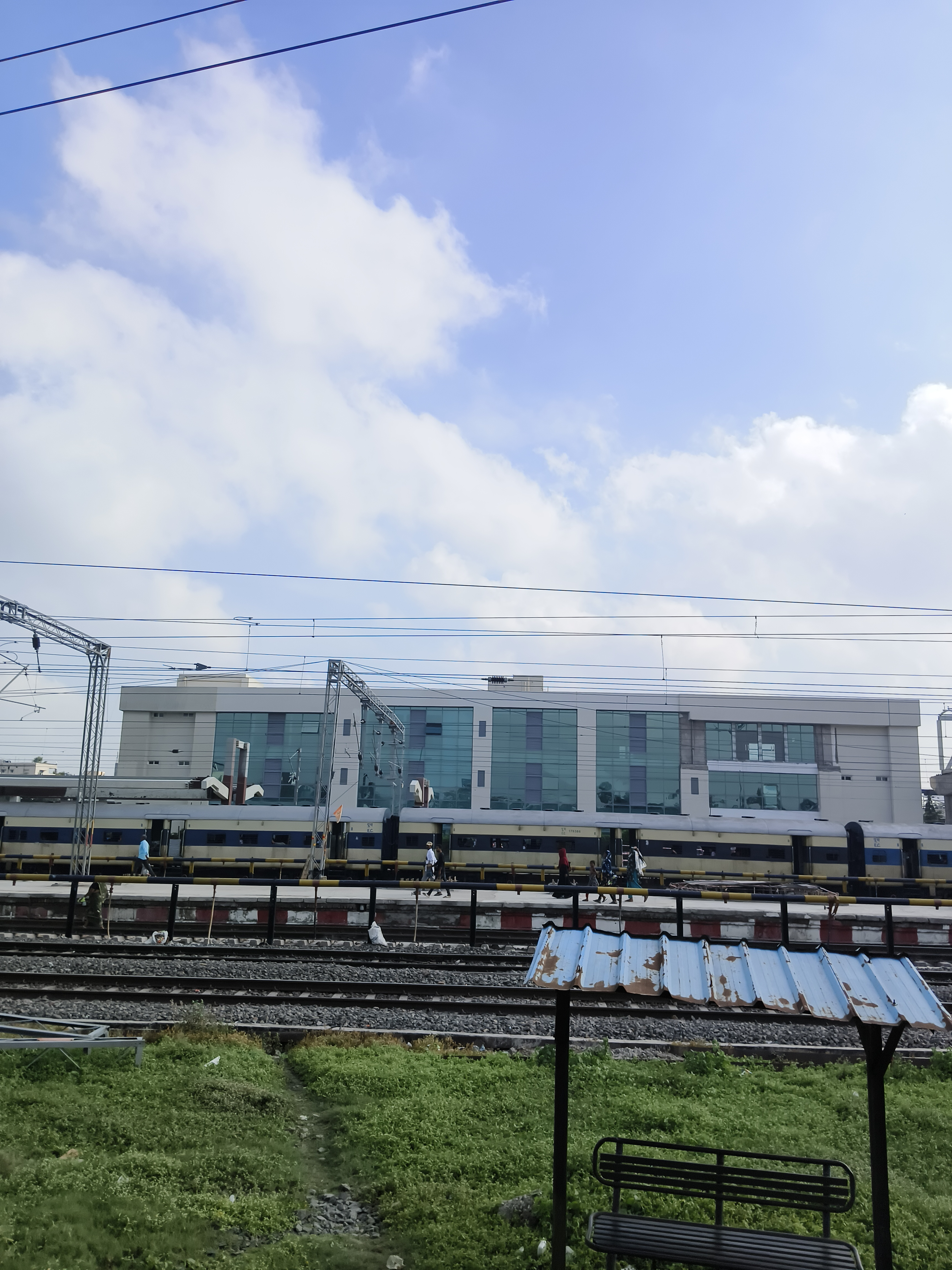
CBT Building

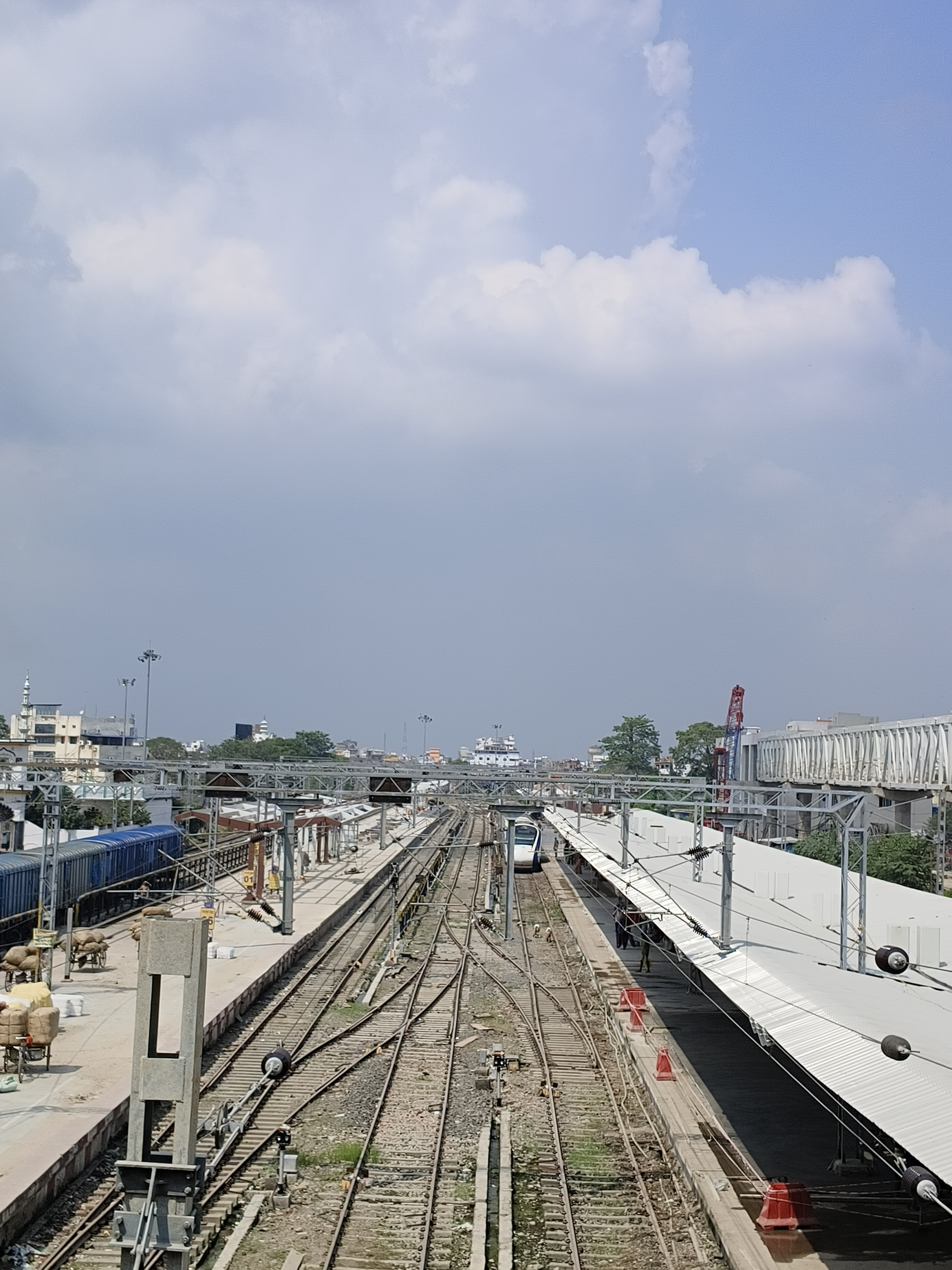
Platform 6, 7 & 8

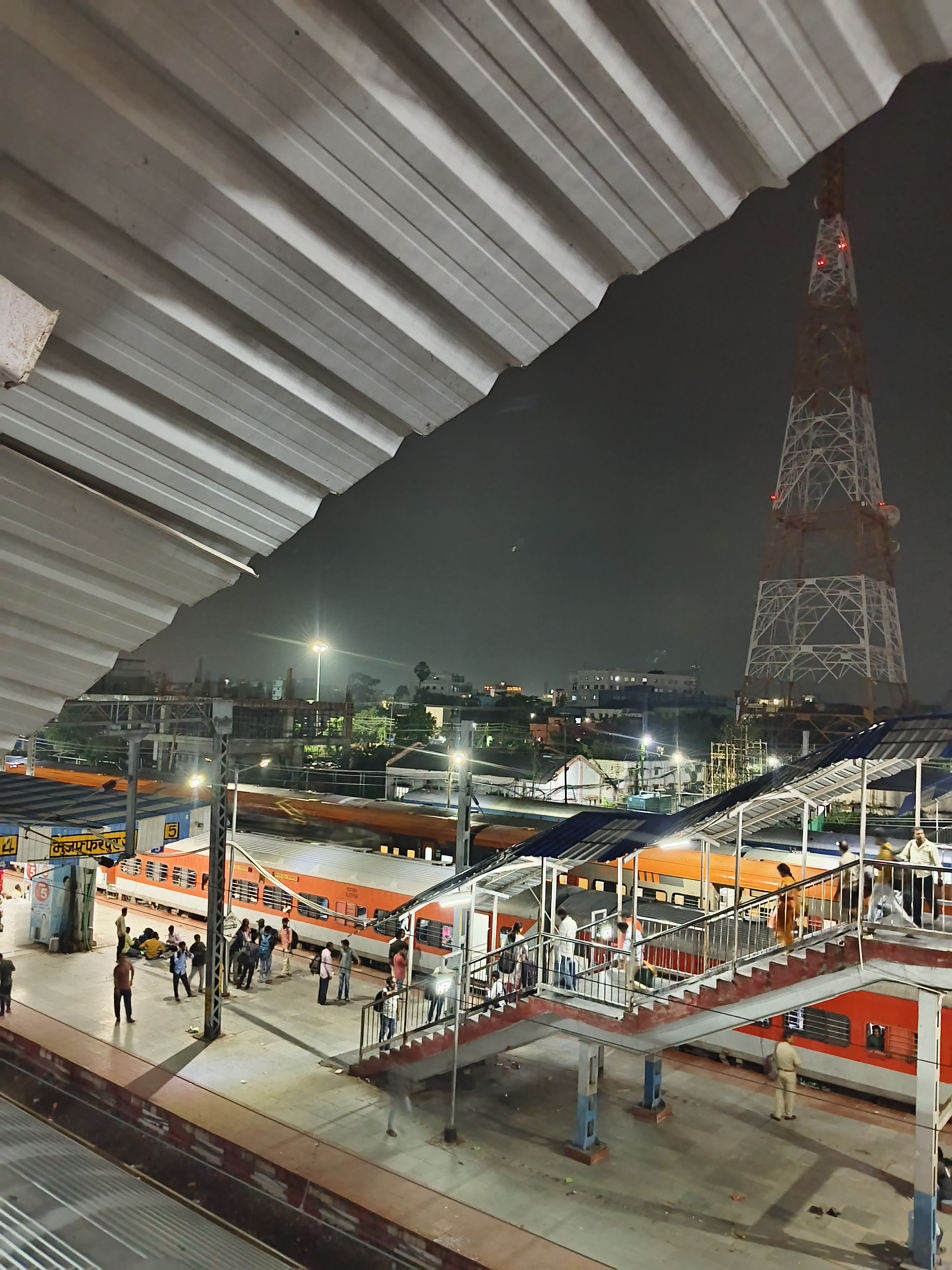
Platform 4 & 5

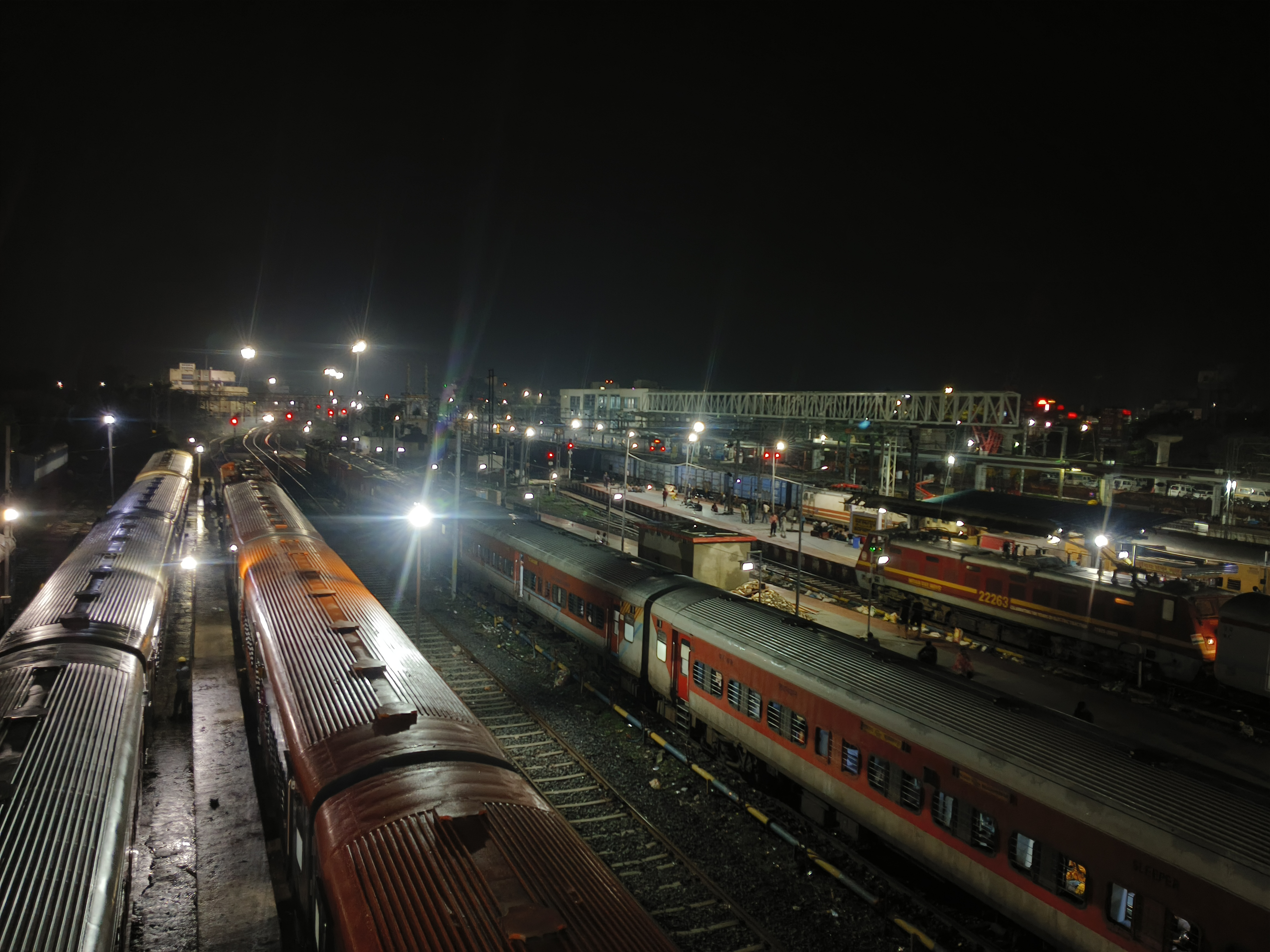
Muzaffarpur Jn Yard

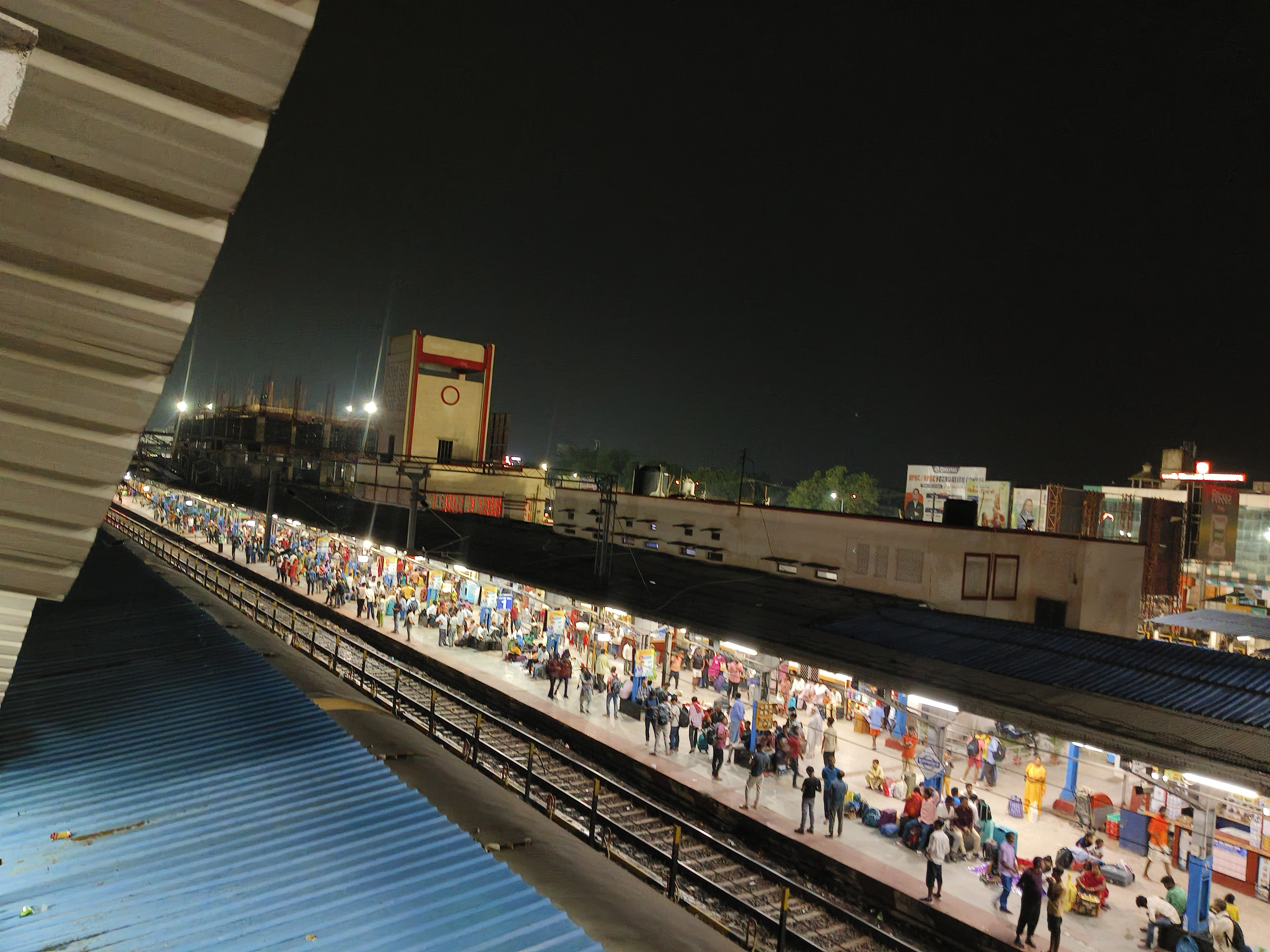
Platform 1

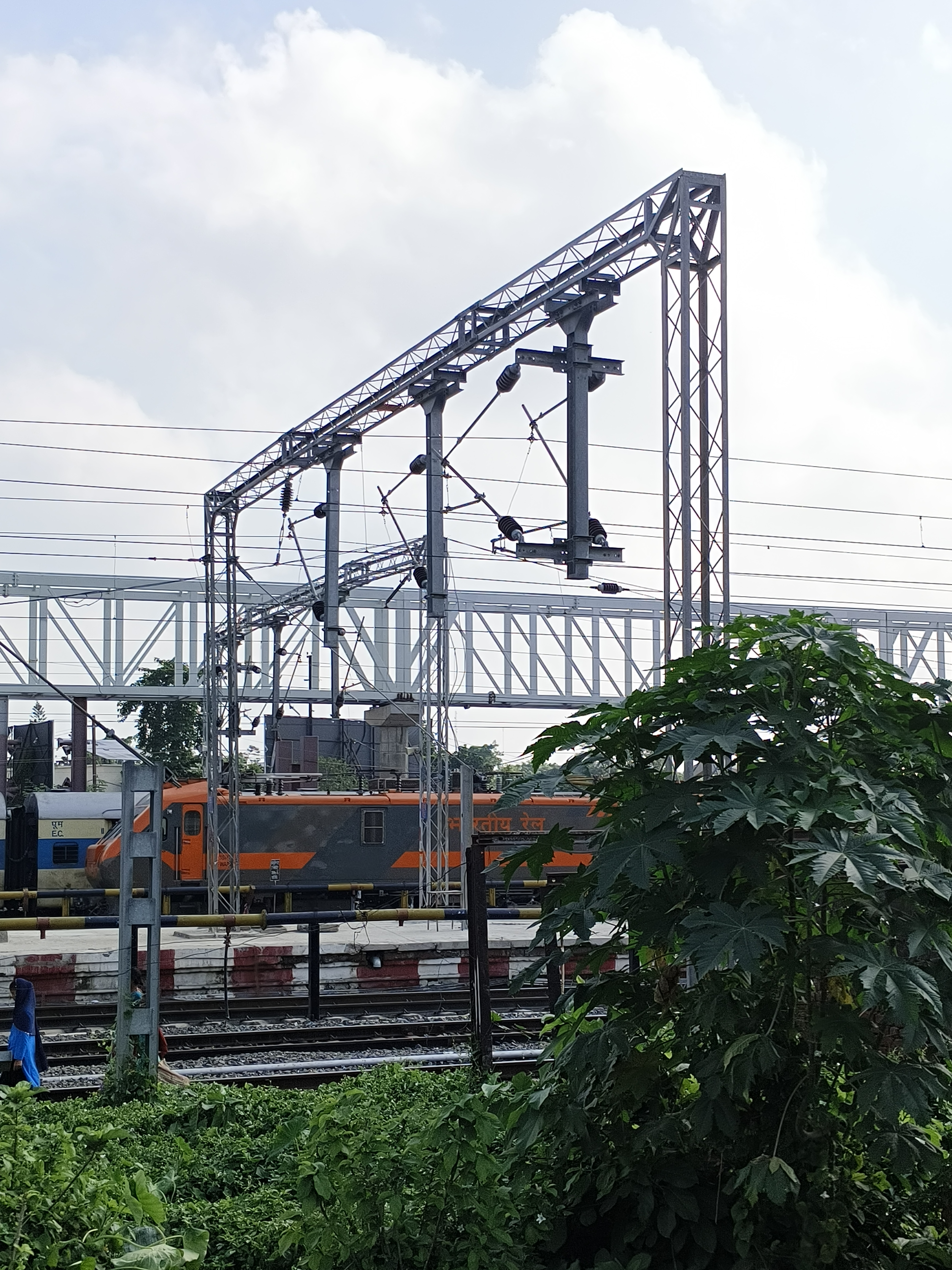
Amrit Bharat Locomotive

Preceding station	Indian Railways	Following station
Narayanpur Anant towards ?	East Central Railway zone Muzaffarpur–Hajipur section, Samastipur–Muzaffarpur section of Muzaffarpur–Gorakhpur line (via Hajipur, Raxaul and Sitamarhi)	Ram Dayalu Nagar towards ?
Terminus	East Central Railway zone Muzaffarpur–Gorakhpur main line of Muzaffarpur–Gorakhpur line (via Hajipur, Raxaul and Sitamarhi)	Kaparpura towards ?
Terminus	East Central Railway zone Muzaffarpur–Sitamarhi section of Muzaffarpur–Gorakhpur line (via Hajipur, Raxaul and Sitamarhi)	Jubbasahni towards ?
