= Muzaffarpur–Sitamarhi section =

Railway line in India

Muzaffarpur–Hajipur section

Overview
- Status: Operational
- Owner: Indian Railways
- Locale: Bihar
- Termini: Muzaffarpur; Sitamarhi
- Stations: 10

Service
- Type: Passenger and freight train line
- Services: Muzaffarpur–Gorakhpur line (via Hajipur, Raxaul and Sitamarhi); Barauni–Gorakhpur, Raxaul and Jainagar lines
- Operator(s): Indian Railways, East Central Railway
- Depot(s): Narayanpur Anant station in Muzaffarpur
- Rolling stock: Diesel locos: WDM-2, WDM-3A

History
- Opened: 2013

Technical
- Line length: 65.8 km (40.9 mi)
- Track length: 69 km (42.9 mi)
- Number of tracks: 1 (Electric BG)
- Track gauge: 5 ft 6 in (1,676 mm) broad gauge
- Electrification: Yes
- Operating speed: up to 90 km/h (56 mph)
- Highest elevation: 73 m (240 ft)

The Muzaffarpur–Sitamarhi section is a railway line connecting Muzaffarpur to Sitamarhi in the Indian state of Bihar. The 65.8 km (40.9 mi) line passes through the plains of North Bihar.

== History ==
The foundation for this project was laid by the then railway minister, Ram Vilas Paswan, in 1997. When Nitish Kumar succeeded he sanctioned funds for it in 2001.

=== Project and construction ===
It took 16 years to complete the 63 km-long Muzaffarpur–Sitamarhi broad-gauge railway line. The project cost Rs 550 crore though the initial estimate was Rs 250 crore. The railway was completed from Runni Saidpur to Sitamarhi in April 2011. The remaining section between Muzaffarpur and Runni Saidpur took another two years due to civil objections.

The first train Muzaffarpur–Sitamarhi Passenger left Muzaffarpur Junction on 27 March 2013

== Stations ==
There are 8 stations between Muzaffarpur Junction and Sitamarhi Junction.

Station code	Station name	Distance (km)
MFP	Muzaffarpur Junction	0
JUBS	Jubbasahani	8.7
PATR	Paramjeevar Tarajeevar	24.7
BPGR	Benipurgram Halt	30.18
NRSD	New Runnisaidpur Halt	38.18
RUSD	Runnisaidpur	41.55
GARA	Garha	47.22
DUMR	Dumra	59.18
BHSA	Bhisa Halt	61.02
SMI	Sitamarhi Junction	65

Stations in the Muzaffarpur–Sitamarhi section
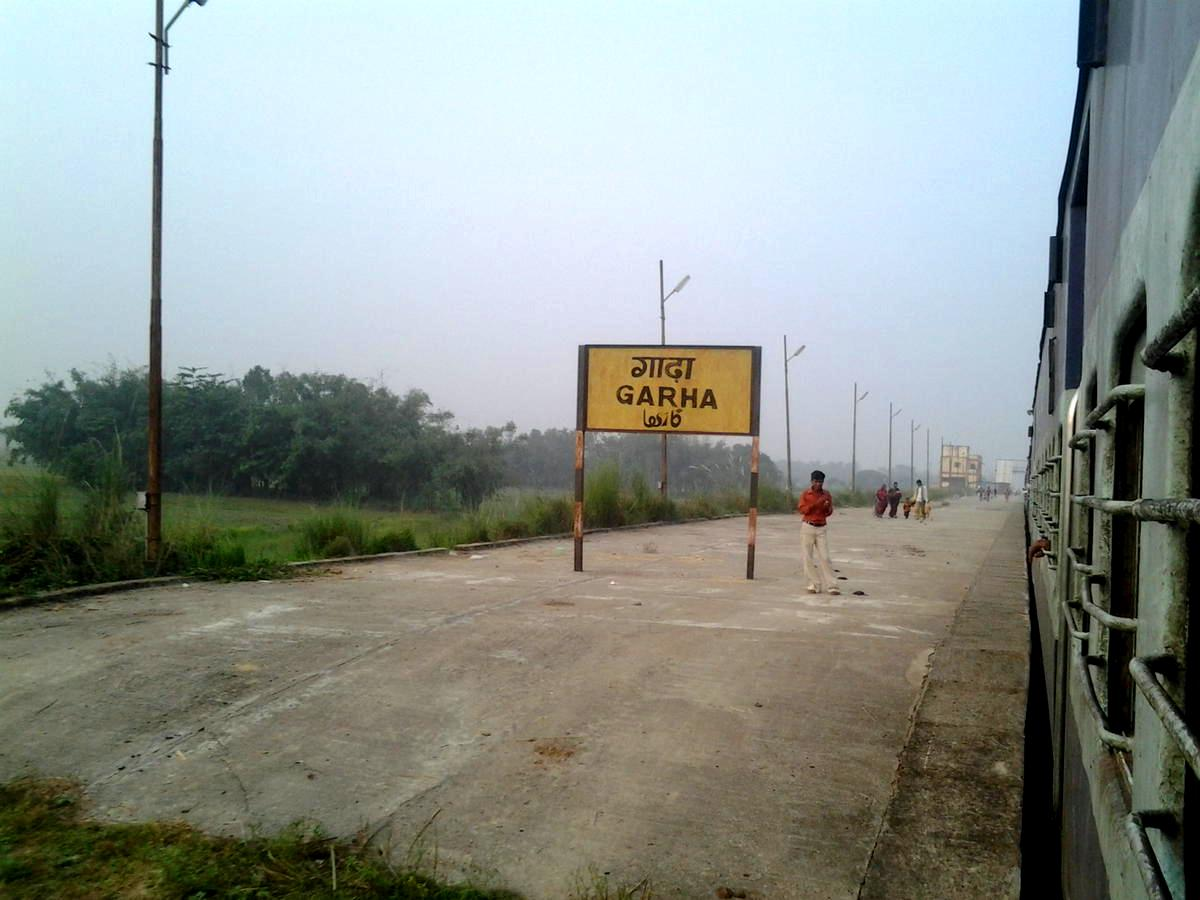
Garha railway station

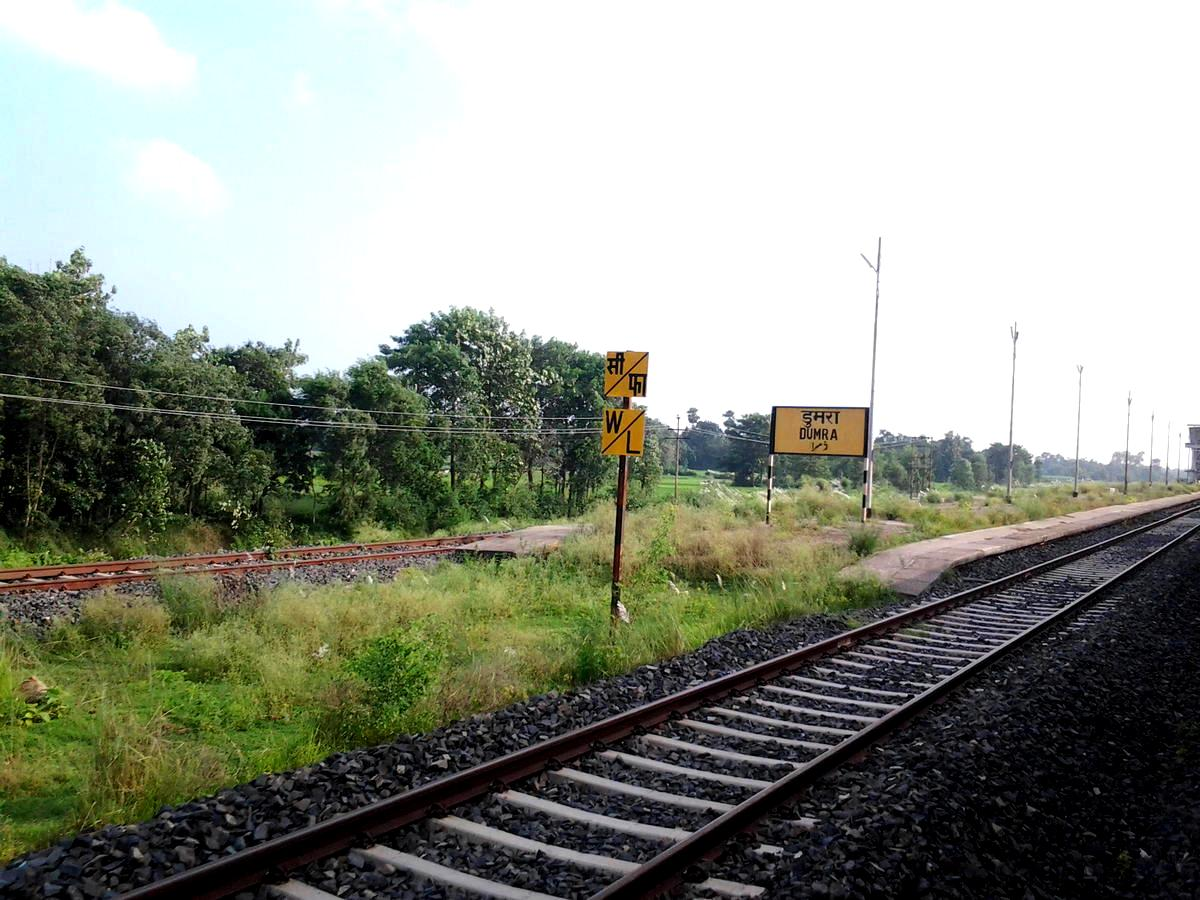
Dumra railway station

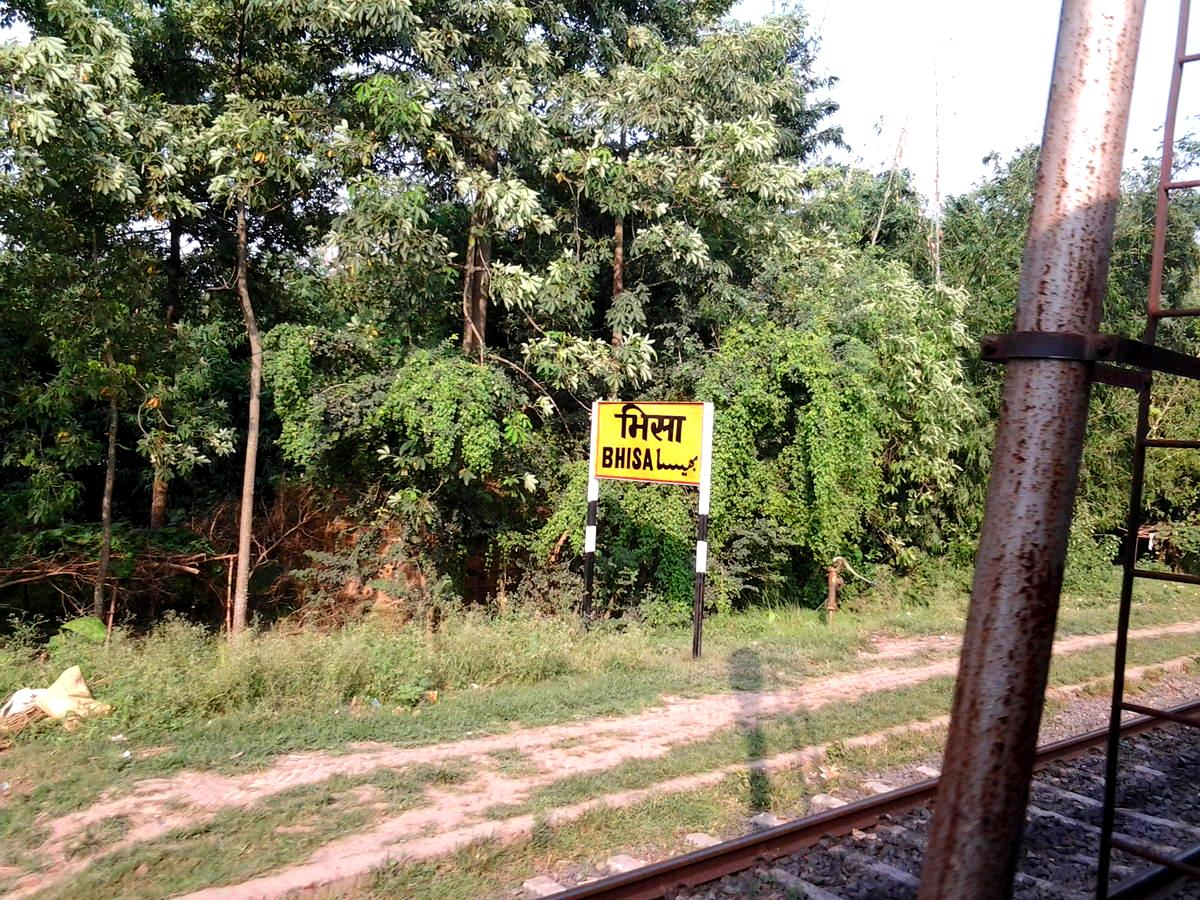
Bhisa Halt railway station

== Trains ==
Until December 2014, 2 pairs of passenger trains and 3 pairs of Express trains were running in the Muzaffarpur–Sitamarhi section.

From 13 July 2014, Sitamarhi–Delhi Anand Vihar Terminal Lichchavi Express was diverted to run via Muzaffarpur in the Muzaffarpur–Sitamarhi section which earlier ran via Darbhanga→Samastipur→Muzaffarpur. Now the 14006/14005 Lichchavi Express directly runs between Sitamarhi→Muzaffarpur.

DEMU Trains

- 75207/75208 Muzaffarpur–Sitamarhi–Samastipur Passenger
- 75255/75256 Muzaffarpur–Darbhanga Passenger
- 75215/75216 Raxaul-Patliputra Fast Passenger

Express Trains

- 14008/14007 Sadbhavana Express (Raxaul–Delhi via Muzaffarpur & Sitamarhi)
- 14018/14017 Sadbhavana Express (Raxaul–Delhi via Muzaffarpur & Sitamarhi)
- 14006/14005 Lichchavi Express (Sitamarhi–Delhi Anand Vihar Terminal via Muzaffarpur)
- 13123/13124 Sitamarhi- Sealdah Express

== Speed limit ==
The Muzaffarpur–Sitamarhi section of Muzaffarpur–Gorakhpur line (via Hajipur, Raxaul and Sitamarhi) is not an A-Class line of Indian Railways. So maximum speed is restricted to 100 km/h, as there is single BG non-electrified line between Muzaffarpur Junction and Sitamarhi Junction which was completed in 2013.

== Sidings and workshops ==
- Kanti Thermal Power Station, Muzaffarpur
- Bharat Wagon Engineering Limited, Muzaffarpur

== See also ==
- Barauni–Gorakhpur, Raxaul and Jainagar lines
- Samastipur–Muzaffarpur section
- Barauni–Samastipur section
- Hajipur Junction
- East Central Railway zone
