= Karpurigram railway station =

Railway station in Bihar

Karpurigram
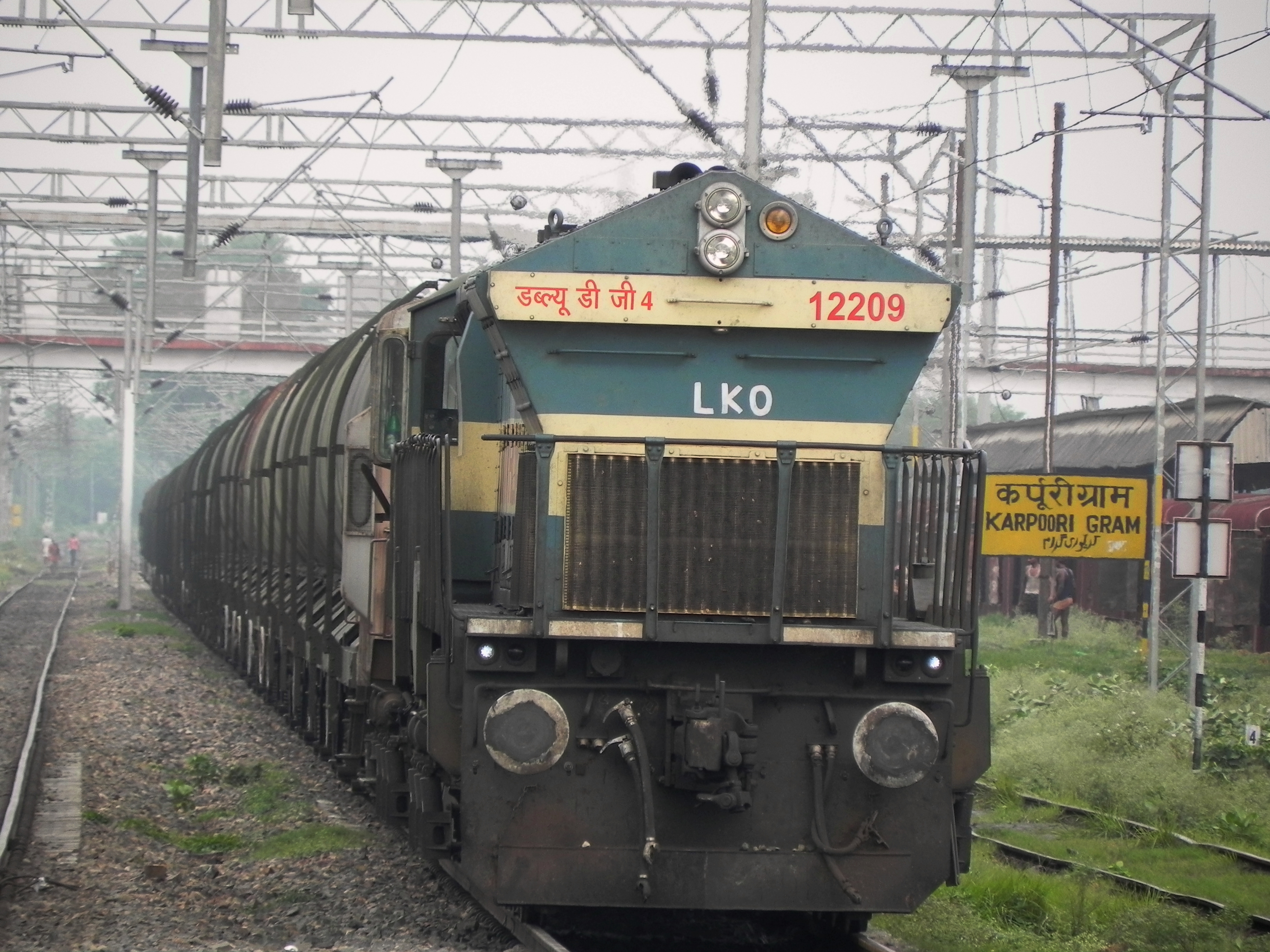
- Karpurigram goods yard showing example of Indian locomotive class WDG-4

General information
- Location: State Highway 49, Karpurigram, Samastipur district, Bihar; India
- Coordinates: 25°52′11″N 85°43′27″E
- Elevation: 51 metres (167 ft)
- System: Indian Railways station
- Owner: Indian Railways
- Line: Samastipur–Muzaffarpur line
- Platforms: 2
- Tracks: 2

Construction
- Structure type: Standard (on ground)
- Parking: Yes

Other information
- Status: Functioning
- Station code: KPGM
- Zone(s): East Central Railway zone
- Division(s): Samastipur

History
- Opened: 1886

Services
Preceding station	Indian Railways	Following station
Samastipur Junction towards ?	East Central Railway zone Samastipur–Muzaffarpur section	Khudiram Bose Pusa towards ?
Location
- Location within India Location within Bihar

Karpurigram railway station (station code: KPGM), is a railway station on Samastipur–Muzaffarpur line under the Samastipur railway division of the East Central Railway zone. The railway station is situated beside State Highway 49 at Karpurigram in Samastipur district of the Indian state of Bihar.
