= Samastipur–Muzaffarpur section =

Railway route in India

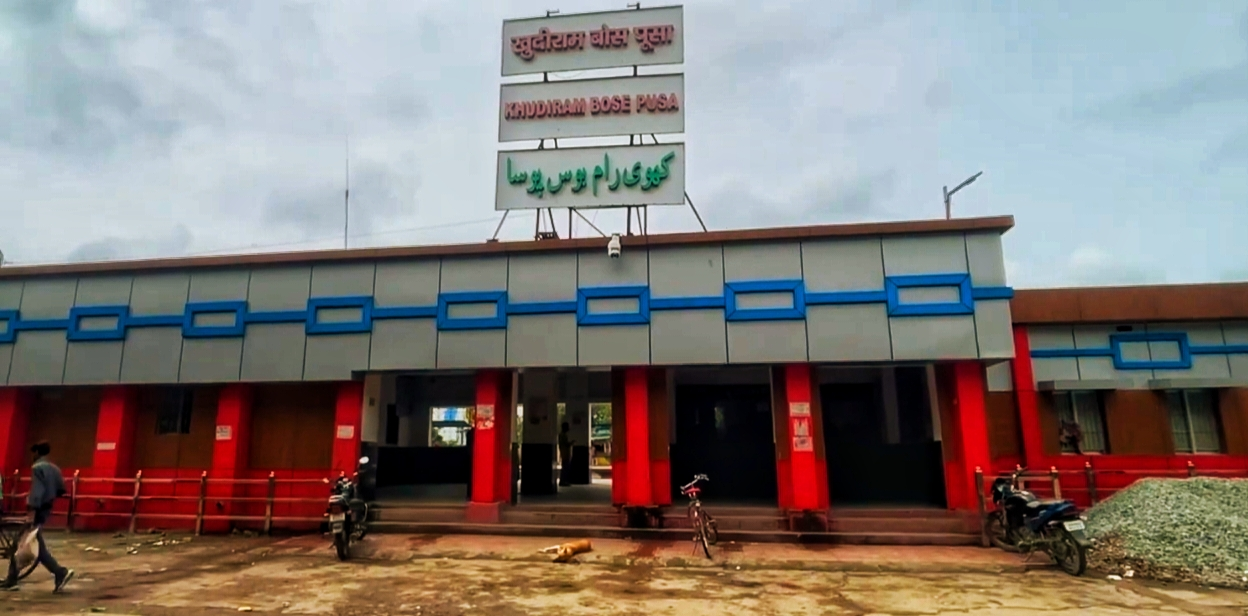
- Khudiram Bose Pusa Railway Station Between Samastipur - Muzaffarpur Section

Overview
- Status: Operational
- Owner: Indian Railways
- Locale: Bihar
- Termini: Samastipur; Muzaffarpur
- Stations: 10

Service
- Type: Passenger and freight train line
- Services: Barauni–Raxaul and Jainagar Lines; Barauni–Gorakhpur line
- Operator(s): Indian Railways, East Central Railway
- Depot(s): Narayanpur Anant station in Muzaffarpur and Karpurigram Station in Samastipur
- Rolling stock: WDM-2, WDM-3A, WDS-5, WDP-4, WDG-4, WAG-7, WAG-9, WAP-4 and WAP-7

History
- Opened: 1886

Technical
- Line length: 53 km (33 mi)
- Track length: 125 km (78 mi)
- Number of tracks: 2 (electrified)
- Track gauge: 5 ft 6 in (1,676 mm) broad gauge
- Electrification: 25 kV 50 Hz AC OHLE (between 2011- December 2014): (started from 24 December 2014)
- Operating speed: up to 130 km/h (81 mph)
- Highest elevation: 57 m (187 ft)

The Samastipur–Muzaffarpur section is a railway line connecting Samastipur to Muzaffarpur in the Indian state of Bihar. The 53 km (33 mi) line passes through the plains of North Bihar and the Gangetic Plain in Bihar.

== Broad-gauge ==
The broad-gauge line was inaugurated on 2 January 1975 by Lalit Narayan Mishra, India's Minister of Railways, who, despite the presence of specially drafted in security, was injured by a time bomb immediately after concluding his speech and died the following day. Four bystanders also died. Those responsible for the blast were found to be members of the Ananda Marg and were convicted in December 2014.

== Electrification ==
Former Railway Minister Laloo Prasad Yadav announced for the electrification of the Barauni–Samastipur–Muzaffarpur–Hajipur line and Muzaffarpur–Gorakhpur line (via Hajipur, Raxaul and Sitamarhi) in the Rail Budget 2008. The electrification began in the year 2011 and was completed in 2014.

== Stations ==
There are 8 stations between Samastipur Junction and Muzaffarpur Junction.

Station code	Station name	Distance (km)
SPJ	Samastipur Junction	0
KPGM	Karpurigram (freight station)	6.5
KRBP	Khudiram Bose Pusa	14
VBH	Vishnupur Bathua Halt	18
DUBH	Dubaha	21
DOL	Dholi	27
SIHO	Siho	34
SLT	Silaut	42
NRPA	Narayanpur Anant (freight station)	48
MFP	Muzaffarpur Junction	52.8

== Speed limit ==
The Barauni–Samastipur–Muzaffarpur–Hajipur line is a B-Class line of Indian Railways. So maximum speed is restricted to 130 km/h.

== Sidings and workshops ==
- Kanti Thermal Power Station, Muzaffarpur
- Bharat Wagon Engineering Limited, Muzaffarpur
- Major Freight Terminal at Narayanpur Anant
- Bharat Petroleum Siding, Narayanpur Anant
- FCI Siding at Narayanpur Anant
- 100+ Diesel Locomotive Yard capacity at Samastipur
- Freight Terminal at Karpurigram railway station
- Workshop for wagon maintenance at Samastipur
Stations in the Samastipur–Muzaffarpur section
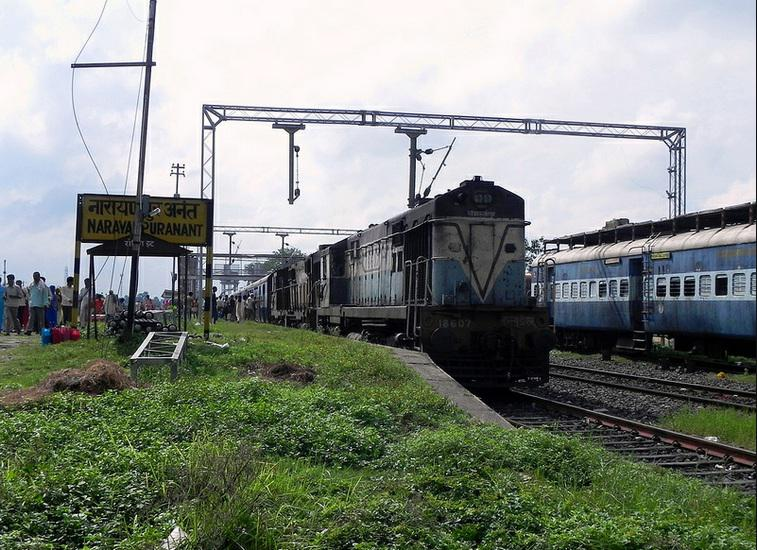
Narayanpur Anant railway station

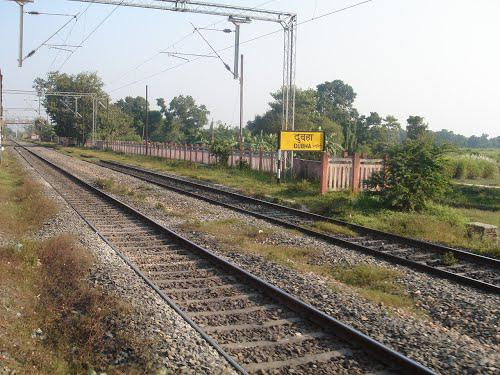
Dubaha railway station

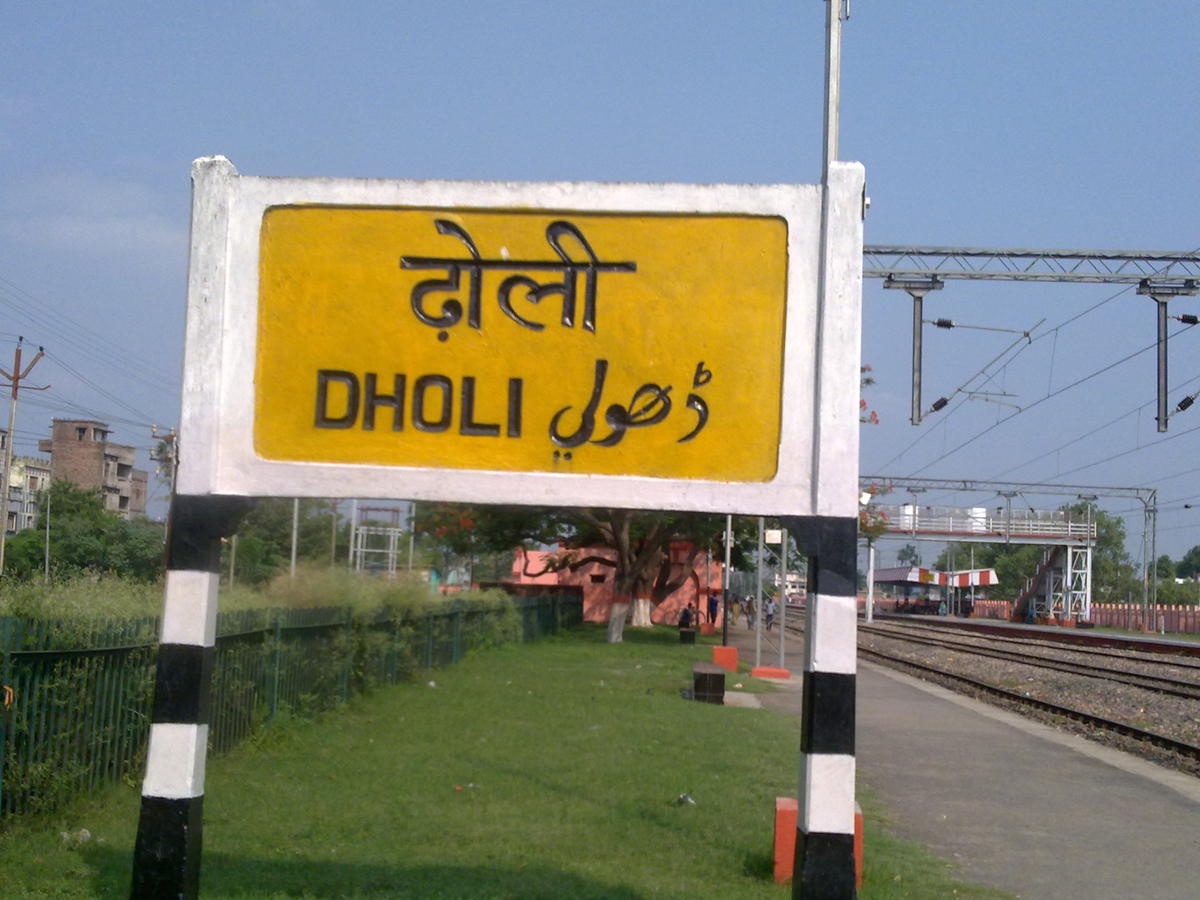
Dholi railway station

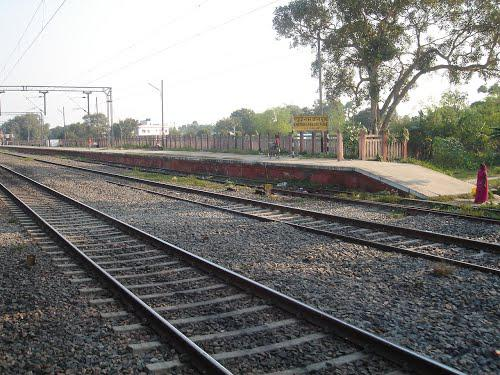
Khudiram Bose Pusa railway station

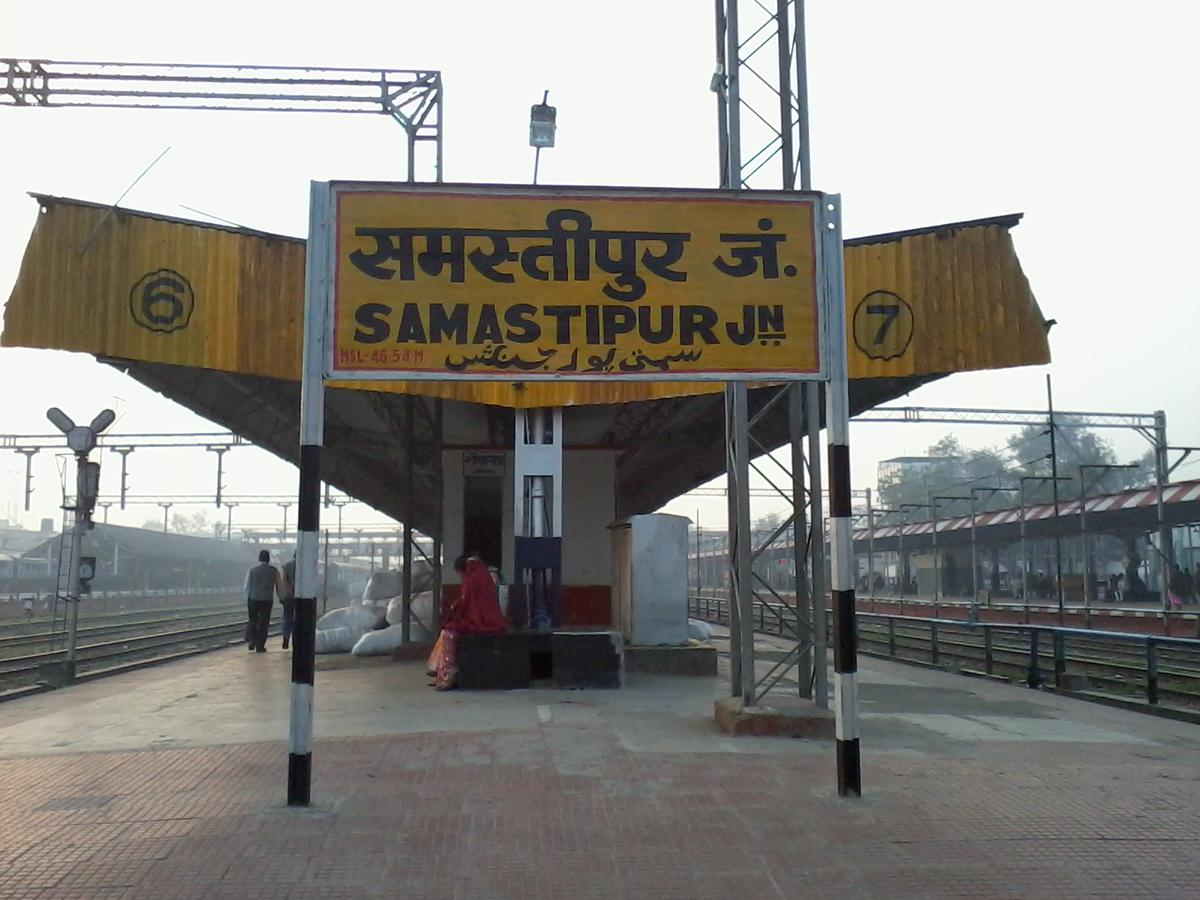
Samastipur Junction

== See also ==
- Barauni–Gorakhpur, Raxaul and Jainagar lines
- Muzaffarpur–Hajipur section
- Barauni–Samastipur section
- Muzaffarpur Junction
- Samastipur Junction
- East Central Railway zone
