= Barauni–Samastipur section =

Railway line in India

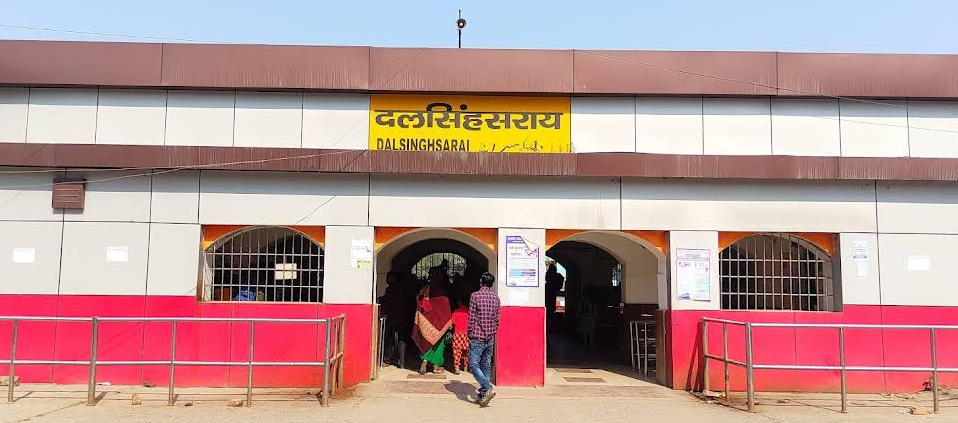
- Dalsinghsarai Railway Station is an important station on Barauni–Samastipur section

Overview
- Status: Operational
- Owner: Indian Railways
- Locale: Bihar
- Termini: Barauni; Samastipur
- Stations: 11

Service
- Type: Passenger and freight train line
- Services: Barauni–Gorakhpur line; Barauni–Raxaul and Jainagar Lines
- Operator(s): Indian Railways, East Central Railway
- Depot(s): Freight terminals: Garhara Yard in Barauni and Karpurigram in Samastipur
- Rolling stock: WDM-2, WDM-3A, WDS-5, WDP-4 and WDG-4

History
- Opened: 1886

Technical
- Line length: 50.54 km (31.40 mi)
- Track length: 120 km (75 mi)
- Number of tracks: 2 (electrified)
- Track gauge: 5 ft 6 in (1,676 mm) broad gauge
- Electrification: 25 kV 50 Hz AC OHLE (between 2011–December 2014) opened on 24 December 2014
- Operating speed: up to 120 km/h (75 mph)
- Highest elevation: 55 m (180 ft)

The Barauni–Samastipur section is a railway line connecting Barauni to Samastipur in the Indian state of Bihar. The 50.54 km (31.40 mi) line passes through the plains of North Bihar and the Gangetic Plain in Bihar.

== Electrification ==
Former Railway Minister Lalu Prasad Yadav announced for the electrification of the Barauni–Samastipur–Muzaffarpur–Hajipur line and Muzaffarpur–Gorakhpur line (via Hajipur, Raxaul and Sitamarhi) in the Rail Budget 2008. The electrification began in 2011 and was completed in 2014.

The electrification work was completed in December 2014 itself. But the first passenger train to run with an electric locomotive was Maurya Express w.e.f. 23 November 2015.

== Stations ==
There are 9 stations between Barauni and Samastipur Junction.

Station code	Station name	Distance (km)
BJU	Barauni	0
BUJ	Barauni Flag	2.71
TGA	Teghra	7.35
BCA	Bachwara Junction	16.35
STJT	Sathajagat	22.80
DSS	Dalsinghsarai	27.34
BSRA	Basarhia Halt	31.57
NAZJ	Nazirganj	35.21
UJP	Ujiarpur	41.49
BLRI	Belari Halt	45.93
SPJ	Samastipur Junction	50.54

== Speed limit ==
The Barauni–Samastipur–Muzaffarpur–Hajipur line is not an A-Class line of Indian Railways. So maximum speed is restricted to 110 km/h.

== Sidings and workshops ==
The following sidings and workshops exist on the line:

- 100+ diesel locomotive yard capacity at Samastipur
- Freight terminal at Karpurigram railway station
- Workshop for wagon maintenance at Samastipur
- Barauni Thermal Power Station, Barauni
- Indian Oil Corporation, Barauni
- Major freight terminal at Garhara Yard

== See also ==
- Muzaffarpur–Gorakhpur line (via Hajipur, Raxaul and Sitamarhi)
- Barauni–Gorakhpur, Raxaul and Jainagar lines
- Muzaffarpur–Hajipur section
- Samastipur–Muzaffarpur section
- Muzaffarpur Junction
- Samastipur Junction
- East Central Railway zone
