= VBH =

VBH may refer to:

- Vicki Butler-Henderson, British motorsport driver and TV presenter
- German VBH light observation helicopter program, MBB Bo 105
- Vishnupur Bathua Halt railway station, Bihar, India
- Bien Hoa Air Base, Vietnam, IATA code VBH
