= BSEB =

BSEB or bseb may refer to:

- Bihar School Examination Board
- Bihar State Electricity Board, former name of Bihar State Power Holding Company Limited
