= North Bihar Power Distribution Company Limited =

Public company in Bihar, India

- Type: Government owned
- Industry: Electricity distribution
- Founded: 1 November 2012 (Carved out of BSEB)
- Headquarters: Patna, Bihar, India
- Area served: 21 districts of North Bihar List: West Champaran; East Champaran; Sitamarhi; Sheohar; Muzaffarpur; Vaishali; Saran; Siwan; Gopalgunj; Madhubani; Darbhanaga; Samastipur; Begusarai; Khagaria; Saharsa; Supaul; Madhepura; Araria; Katihar; Purnea; Kishanganj
- Key people: Mukul Kumar Gupta, IAS, 'Managing Director, NBPDCL'
- Products: Electricity
- Parent: Government of Bihar
- Website: nbpdcl.in

North Bihar Power Distribution Company Limited is a public sector undertaking (PSU) controlled by the Government of Bihar, India. It was formed on 1 November 2012 under section 14 of the Electricity Act of 2003, and is the successor to the erstwhile Bihar State Electricity Board.

== Infrastructure ==
The company has an infrastructure facility in its operating area with 246 power system stabilizers, 506 power transformers, 139 33 kV feeders, 825 11 kV feeders and around 20,900 distribution transformers of various capacities.

== Network ==
The company encompasses an area of 21 districts of northern Bihar further divided into 29 divisions: Araria - I, Bagha, Bairagania, Barauli, Barauni, Barsoi, Begusarai, Bettiah, Chhapra, Darbhanga, Forbesganj, Gogari, Gopalganj, Hajipur, Katihar, Khagaria, Mahnar Bazar, Motihari, Narkatiaganj, Purnia, Ramnagar, Revelganj, Samastipur, Sitamarhi, Siwan, Sonpur, Sugauli, Kishanganj, Madhepura, Raxaul. Catering to the power requirements of around 1.8 million consumers in 2012.

== See also ==
- Bihar State Power Holding Company Limited
- South Bihar Power Distribution Company Limited
