= South Bihar Power Distribution Company Limited =

Power Distribution Company in Bihar

- Type: Government owned
- Industry: Electricity distribution
- Founded: November 01, 2012 (Carved out of BSPHCL)
- Headquarters: Patna, Bihar, India
- Area served: 17 districts of south Bihar List: Patna; Nalanda; Gaya; Bhagalpur; Lakhisarai; Jehanabad; Aurangabad; Buxar; Bhojpur; Rohtas; Arwal; Munger; Banka; Nawada; Sheikhpura; Jamui; Kaimur
- Key people: Mahendra Kumar (IAS), Managing Director
- Products: Electricity
- Parent: Government of Bihar
- Website: sbpdcl.co.in

South Bihar Power Distribution Company Limited (SBPDCL) is a public sector undertaking (PSU) controlled by the Government of Bihar, in India. It was formed on 1 November 2012 under section 14 of the Electricity Act of 2003, and is the successor to the erstwhile Bihar State Electricity Board.

== Infrastructure ==
SBPDCL has an infrastructure facility in its operating area with 512 power system stabilizers, 705 power transformers, 139 33 kV feeders, 825 11 kV feeders and around 29,668 distribution transformers of various capacities.

== Network ==
SBPDCL encompasses an area of 17 districts of southern Bihar further divided into 36 divisions viz., Ara, Aurangabad, Banka, Bankipore, Barbigha, Barh, Barahiya, Bhabua, Bihar Sharif, Bikramganj, Bakhtiyarpur, Buxar, Dakbungalow, Daudnagar, Dehri, Dumraon, Fatuha, Gaya district, Gulzarbagh, Hilsa, Jehanabad, Jamalpur, Jamui, Jhajha, Kankarbagh-II (Ram Krishna Nagar), Lakhisarai, Makhdumpur, Maner, Masaurhi, Mokama, Munger, Naugachia, Nawada, Patliputra, Patna City, Rajendra Nagar, Patna, Rajgir, Sasaram, Sheikhpura, Sherghati, Sultanganj, Warisaliganj. Catering to the power requirements of around 1.8 million consumers in 2012.

== See also ==
- Bihar State Power Holding Company Limited
- North Bihar Power Distribution Company Limited
