= HURL Barauni =

Hindustan Urvarak and Rasayan Limited
- Type: Joint Venture of Public Sector Enterprise
- Traded as: Unlisted
- Industry: Fertilizers and Chemicals
- Founded: June 15, 2016; 10 years ago
- Headquarters: Core-4, 9th Floor, Scope Minar, Laxmi Nagar, District Centre, New Delhi, India
- Area served: India (primarily Uttar Pradesh, Bihar, Jharkhand, Madhya Pradesh, Chhattisgarh, Odisha, West Bengal)
- Key people: Siba Prasad Mohanty (MD)
- Products: Neem-coated urea, Bio-fertilizers, Calcium Nitrate
- Production output: ▲38.1 Lakh Metric Tonnes per annum (cumulative)
- Revenue: ▲₹15,900 crore (FY 2024-25)
- Net income: ▲₹1,324.5 crore (FY 2023-24)
- Total assets: ▲₹29,040.5 crore (FY 2023-24)
- Owner: NTPC Limited (29.67%), Indian Oil Corporation (29.67%), Coal India Limited (29.67%), FCIL and HFCL (11%)
- Number of employees: ~800 (permanent)
- Website: hurl.net.in
- Footnotes; CIN: U24100DL2016PLC358399

Hindustan Urvarak and Rasayan Limited, popularly known as HURL is a Fertilizer company under Ministry of Chemicals and Fertilizers, Government of India, established as joint-venture of PSUs such as Coal India, NTPC and IOCL to revive old Government owned fertilizer plants.

== Sindri Fertiliser Plant ==
The Sindri Fertilizer Factory started production on October 31, 1951.The Fertilizer Corporation of India Limited (FCIL) was incorporated in January 1961, with the Sindri unit as its flagship plant. A modernization project was completed, commissioning a new 900 MTPD (Metric Tonnes Per Day) ammonia and 1000 MTPD urea plant on October 1, 1979.The modernization project in 1978 led to a "mismatch of equipment" and a failure to replace weathered-out parts, leading to significant losses. In 1992 The FCIL, including the Sindri unit, was declared a "sick" company and was referred to the Board for Industrial and Financial Restructuring (BIFR). The government formally decided to close down FCIL and all its units. Most of the 6,000+ employees, including 2,166 at Sindri, were released under a Voluntary Separation Scheme (VSS).

== Gorakhpur Fertilizer Plant ==
The Gorakhpur fertilizer unit was established in 1969 under the Fertilizer Corporation of India Limited (FCIL). It produced urea marketed as 'Swastik Chhaap' and had a production capacity of about 950 tonnes per day.The plant's operations came to a standstill in 1990.

== Barauni Fertiliser Plant ==
In January 1961, Fertilizer Corporation of India Ltd. (FCI) was created out of the merger of Sindri Fertilizers and Chemicals Ltd. and Hindustan Fertilizer and Chemicals Ltd. Between 1961 and 1977, FCI created seventeen fertilizer units. Seven started operating while the remaining ten were at various stages of implementation.

In 1978 the Government of India set up a committee to reorganize its fertilizer industry. Per the committee's recommendation, the government approved the split of FCI and National Fertilizers Ltd. (NFL), into five separate entities. The newly formed Hindustan Fertilizer Corporation Ltd (HFC) took charge of the Namrup, Haldia, Barauni and Durgapur, while FCI were assigned the Sindri, Gorakhpur, Ramagundam, Talcher, Korba units and the Jodhpur Mining Organization. The other units were allocated to Rashtriya Chemicals and Fertilizers Ltd., National Fertilizers Ltd together with a planning and development company, Project and Development (India) Ltd.

On 13 July 2016, Union Cabinet approved revival of Barauni Fertiliser Plant by Hindustan Urvarak and Rasayan Limited (HURL), a joint-venture of public sector companies of NTPC, Coal India and IOC in November 2017. In November 2017, Bihar cabinet approved proposal to wave off stamp duty amounting to Rs 216 crore for leasing out 480 acre land of Barauni Fertiliser Plant belonging to Hindustan Fertilizers Corporation Ltd to Hindustan Urvarak and Rasayan Ltd for a period of 55 years for its revival.

== History ==
The township was built in the late 1970s to house the employees of The Hindustan Fertilizer Corporation of India Limited's, urea production plant. The installed capacity was 3.3 (lakh-MT).

The Barauni Unit produces urea under the Brand Name "Moti". Production was on 1 January 1999 due to ongoing losses and insufficient subsidies.

Most employees were released via Voluntary Separation Scheme (VSS) in 2002–03. The remaining employees were dismissed during 2003–04.

== Layout and facilities ==
The township is gated, with two entrances. Represented by Postal Code 851115 with a dedicated sub Post Office, it has over 1,500 housing units. Urvarak Nagar is a copybook example of a well laid out township. Situated by National Highway 31 and spread over an area of 280 acres, all arterial roads crisscrossing this township intersect each other at 90°. Amenities include two shopping complexes, a hospital, bank, recreation centers, guest houses and parks. A temple, a mosque, a church and a Gurudwara are also in the township.

Sports facilities include badminton, basketball, cricket, shuttle, soccer, tennis and volleyball. The township has two recreation centers, Vinod Kendra and Fertilizer Officer's Club (F.O.C.).

In the mid-1980s it has been linked to a cable network.

== Schools ==
- Kendriya Vidyalaya Sangathan HFC Barauni (Elementary, Middle & High School)
- DAV Public School (Elementary, Middle & High School)
- KG School (Elementary, Middle)

Kendriya Vidyalaya and DAV Public School are operated by the local administration and respective school committee. KG school closed by 2003.

== Transportation ==
The company provides transport service to and from the factory and to several local destinations including district city Begusarai.
