= State Highway 49 (Bihar) =

Road in Bihar, India

State Highway 49

Route information
- Length: 64 km (40 mi)

Major junctions
- West end: Hajipur
- East end: Samastipur

Location
- Country: India
- State: Bihar

Highway system
- Roads in India; Expressways; National; State; Asian; State Highways in Bihar

State Highway 49 (SH-49) is a state highway in Bihar State. This state highway passes through two major districts (Vaishali district, Samastipur district).

== Route ==
The route of SH-49 from west to east is as follows:

- Hajipur
- Dighikala west
- Mahua
- Tajpur (Samastipur)
- Samastipur
