= New Karbigahiya =

New Karbigahiya Karbigahiya
- – Neighbourhood –
- Location in Patna, India
- Coordinates: 25°36′1.2″N 85°8′25.5″E
- Country: India
- State: Bihar
- City: Patna

Languages
  - Spoken: Hindi, English, Magadhi, Bengali, Bhojpuri, Urdu
- Time zone: UTC+5:30 (IST)
- PIN: 800001
- Boundaries: Postal Park; Mithapur
- Planning agency: Patna Metropolitan Area Authority
- Civic agency: Patna Municipal Corporation
- Railway services: Patna Junction (Karbigahiya side)
- Website: patna.nic.in

New Karbigahiya or simply Karbigahiya is a neighbourhood in the central section of Patna in the eastern state of Bihar in India. It is located on the south side of Patna Junction and also serves as a direct access point for platforms of the railway station. It is one of the busiest pedestrian and automobile areas in the city of Patna as a lot of vehicular traffic flows from the railway station to city and main bus stand of Patna. The neighbourhood also has an auto stand known as Karbigahiya auto stand.

== History ==
Karbigahiya is an old locality of Patna which was part of wider Mithapur area of the city. Patna Junction railway station was opened as Bankipore Junction in 1862. As the railway station grew in size, south end of the junction expanded up to northern end of Karbigahiya neighbourhood.

The neighbourhood is also the location of an old Thermal power station which was run by Bihar State Electricity Board (BSEB) and closed in October 1984. The Cooling tower and dilapidated buildings of the thermal plant can still be seen in the area.

== General Information ==
New Karbigahiya is predominantly a residential area in the city of Patna. There are some local shops and commercial centers which cater to the local population. The area also has a bank branch of Bank of India and scores of ATMs. The area also has an auto stand located on the south side of Patna Junction.

A number of temples and mosques are present in the area such as - Karbighaya Temple, Taposthan Mandir, Durga Mandir, Jama Masjid and Chhoti Masjid to name a few. The neighbourhood also has a township for employees of Power Grid Corporation of India.

== Transport and Connectivity ==
Mithapur Bus Stop is the main bus stop in the area and connects it to other parts of the city as well as to other towns and cities. Auto rickshaws and Paddle rickshaws can also be hailed from the area to Railway Station, Airport and other residential and commercial areas of Patna. Patna Junction back entrance gate is located in the neighbourhood.

== Police Stations ==
Jakkanpur Thana of Patna Police serve this neighbourhood.

== List of important places in the neighbourhood ==
=== Religious places ===
- Karbighaya Temple
- Taposthan Mandir
- Durga Mandir
- Jama Masjid
- Chhoti Masjid

=== Hotels ===
- Hotel Chanakya Inn
- Hotel Surya Vihar

=== Banks ===
- Bank of India

=== Other places of interest ===
- Old Thermal Power Plant Karbigahiya
