= Narayanpur Anant railway station =

Railway station in Bihar, India

Narayanpur Anant नारायणपुर अनंत
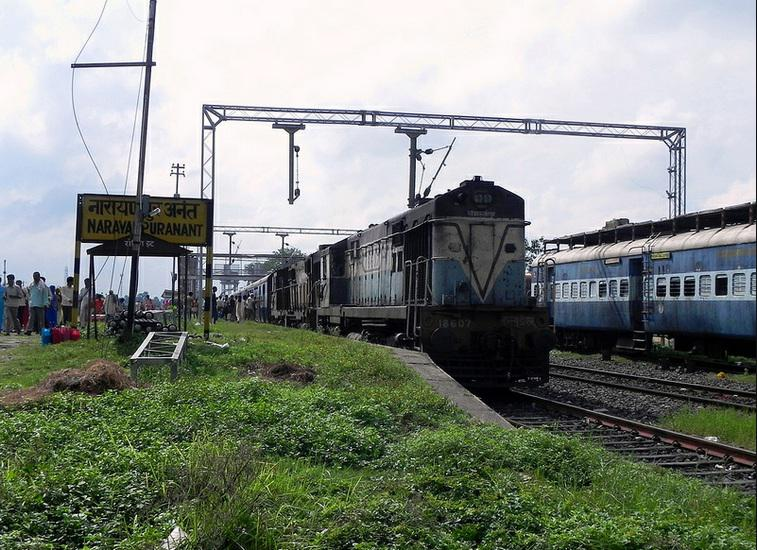
- A train departing from Narayanpur Anant

General information
- Location: Bela Road, Narayanpur Anant, Muzaffarpur district, Bihar; India
- Coordinates: 26°05′21″N 85°24′33″E
- Elevation: 56 metres (184 ft)
- System: Indian Railways station
- Owner: Indian Railways
- Line: Samastipur–Muzaffarpur line
- Platforms: 3
- Tracks: 2

Construction
- Structure type: Standard (on ground)
- Parking: Yes

Other information
- Status: Functioning
- Station code: NRPA
- Zone(s): East Central Railway zone
- Division(s): Samastipur

History
- Opened: 1886

Services
Preceding station	Indian Railways	Following station
Silaut towards ?	East Central Railway zone Samastipur–Muzaffarpur section	Muzaffarpur Junction towards ?
Location
- Location within India Location within Bihar

Narayanpur Anant railway station (station code: NRPA), is a railway station on Samastipur–Muzaffarpur line under the Samastipur railway division of the East Central Railway zone. The railway station is situated beside Bela Road at Narayanpur Anant in Muzaffarpur district of the Indian state of Bihar.
