= Vishnupur Bathua Halt railway station =

Railway station in Bihar, India

Vishnupur Bathua Halt

General information
- Location: Tajpur―Pusa Road, Vishnupur Bathua, Samastipur district, Bihar; India
- Coordinates: 25°55′52″N 85°38′39″E
- Elevation: 53 metres (174 ft)
- System: Indian Railways station
- Owner: Indian Railways
- Line: Samastipur–Muzaffarpur line
- Platforms: 2
- Tracks: 2

Construction
- Structure type: Standard (on ground)
- Parking: Yes

Other information
- Status: Functioning
- Station code: VBH
- Zone(s): East Central Railway zone
- Division(s): Samastipur

History
- Opened: 1886

Services
Preceding station	Indian Railways	Following station
Khudiram Bose Pusa towards ?	East Central Railway zone Samastipur–Muzaffarpur section	Dubaha towards ?
Location
- Location within India Location within Bihar

Vishnupur Bathua Halt railway station (station code: VBH), is a halt railway station on Samastipur–Muzaffarpur line under the Samastipur railway division of the East Central Railway zone. The railway station is situated beside Tajpur―Pusa Road at Vishnupur Bathua in Samastipur district of the Indian state of Bihar.
