= Dholi railway station =

Railway station in Bihar, India

Dholi
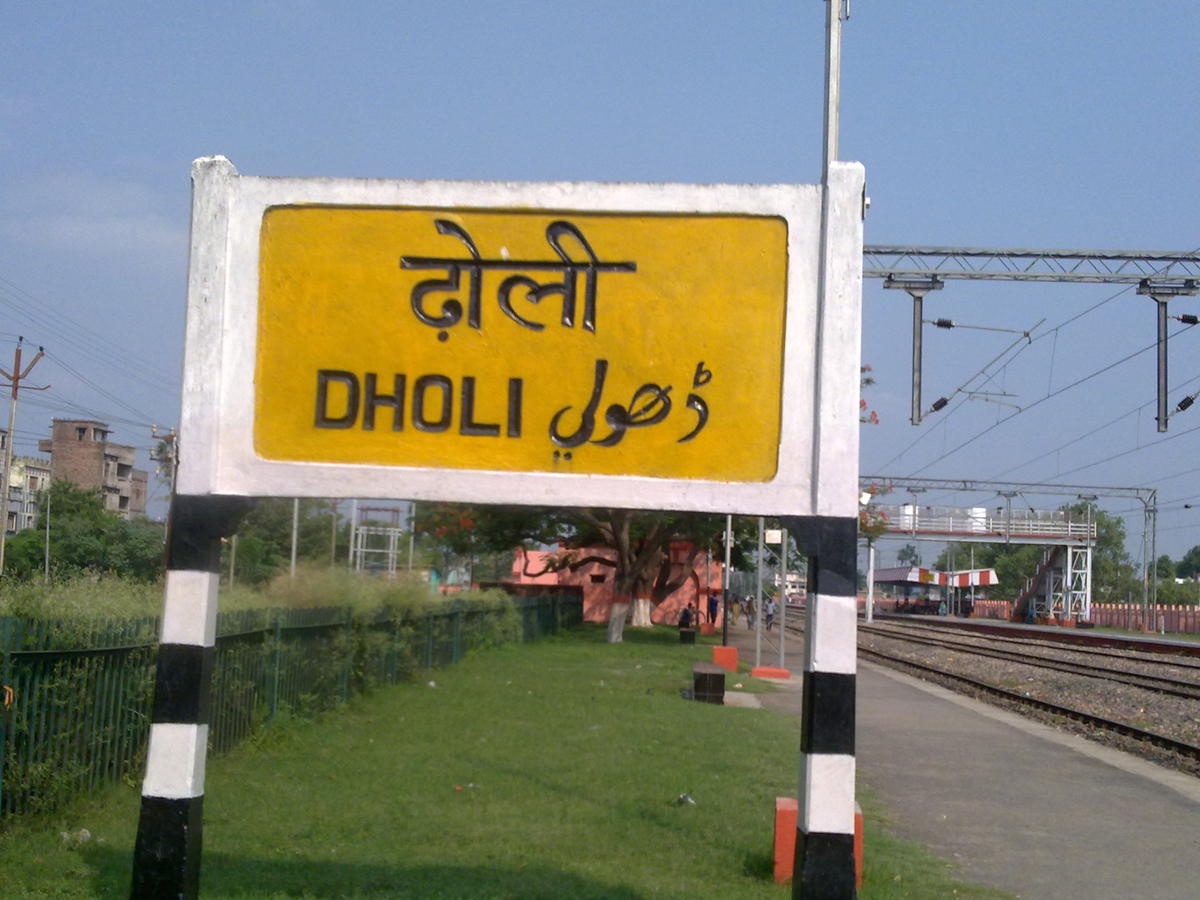

General information
- Location: National Highway 28, Faridpur Sakra, Muzaffarpur district, Bihar; India
- Coordinates: 25°58′37″N 85°33′45″E
- Elevation: 55 metres (180 ft)
- System: Indian Railways station
- Owner: Indian Railways
- Line: Samastipur–Muzaffarpur line
- Platforms: 2
- Tracks: 2

Construction
- Structure type: Standard (on ground)
- Parking: Yes
- Accessible: No

Other information
- Status: Functioning
- Station code: DOL
- Zone(s): East Central Railway zone
- Division(s): Samstipur

History
- Opened: 1886

Services
Preceding station	Indian Railways	Following station
Dubaha towards ?	East Central Railway zone Samastipur–Muzaffarpur section	Siho towards ?
Location
- Location within India Location within Bihar

Dholi railway station (station code: DOL), is a railway station on Samastipur–Muzaffarpur line under the Samastipur railway division of the East Central Railway zone. The railway station is situated beside National Highway 28 at Faridpur Sakra in Muzaffarpur district of the Indian state of Bihar.
