= Siho railway station =

Railway station in Bihar, India

Siho

General information
- Location: National Highway 28, Sujawalpur Chauriwan, Siho, Muzaffarpur district, Bihar; India
- Coordinates: 26°00′30″N 85°30′21″E
- Elevation: 53 metres (174 ft)
- System: Indian Railways station
- Owner: Indian Railways
- Line: Samastipur–Muzaffarpur line
- Platforms: 2
- Tracks: 2

Construction
- Structure type: Standard (on ground)
- Parking: Yes

Other information
- Status: Functioning
- Station code: SIHO
- Zone(s): East Central Railway zone
- Division(s): Samastipur

History
- Opened: 1886

Services
Preceding station	Indian Railways	Following station
Dholi towards ?	East Central Railway zone Samastipur–Muzaffarpur section	Silaut towards ?
Location
- Location within India Location within Bihar

Siho railway station (station code: SIHO), is a railway station on Samastipur–Muzaffarpur line under the Samastipur railway division of the East Central Railway zone. The railway station is situated beside National Highway 28 at Sujawalpur Chauriwan, Siho in Muzaffarpur district of the Indian state of Bihar.
