= Dighikala West =

Dighikala west
- Gram Panchayat
- Location in Bihar, India Dighikala west (India)
- Coordinates: 25°40′48.0″N 85°13′12.0″E
- Country: India
- State: Bihar
- District: vaishali
- Assembly Constituency: hajipur assembly constituency (AC.123)

Languages
  - Official: Hindi
- Time zone: UTC+5:30 (IST)
- ISO 3166 code: IN-BR

Dighikala west is a village in Hajipur, vaishali district, Bihar state of India.

== Geography ==
This panchayat is located at 25°40′48.0″N 85°13′12.0″E

== panchayat office ==
samudayik bhawan Chak Bigha Jani (समुदाियक भवन Chak Bigha Jani )

== Nearest City/Town ==
Hajipur (Distance 3 km)

== Nearest major road highway or river ==
NH 77 (National highway 77) SH 49 ( state highway 49) And Railway line

== Villages in panchayat ==
The following villages are in this panchayat

s.n	villages
1	Dighi Kalan
2	Jagdishpur
3	Sair Chak
4	Chak Faizullah
5	Chak Bigha Jani
6	Bagh Asdullah Arazi AzRakbe
7	Adalpur
8	Naurangabad
