= Dubaha railway station =

Railway station in Bihar, India

Dubaha
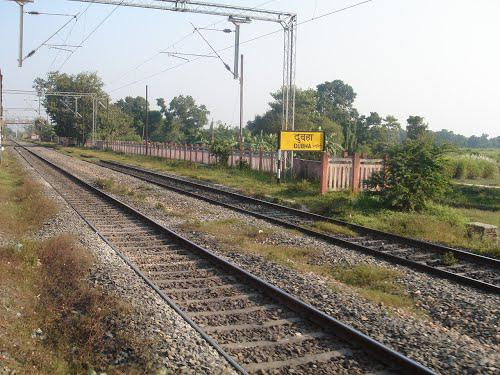

General information
- Location: Dubaha, Dubaha Buzurg, Muzaffarpur district, Bihar; India
- Coordinates: 25°56′56″N 85°37′02″E
- Elevation: 54 metres (177 ft)
- System: Indian Railways station
- Owner: Indian Railways
- Line: Samastipur–Muzaffarpur line
- Platforms: 2
- Tracks: 2

Construction
- Structure type: Standard (on ground)
- Parking: Yes

Other information
- Status: Functioning
- Station code: DUBH
- Zone(s): East Central Railway zone
- Division(s): Samastipur

History
- Opened: 1886

Services
Preceding station	Indian Railways	Following station
Vishnupur Bathua Halt towards ?	East Central Railway zone Samastipur–Muzaffarpur section	Dholi towards ?
Location
- Location within India Location within Bihar

Dubaha railway station (station code: DUBH) is a railway station on Samastipur–Muzaffarpur line under the Samastipur railway division of the East Central Railway zone. The railway station is situated at Dubaha, Dubaha Buzurg in Muzaffarpur district of the Indian state of Bihar.
