= Bihar State Power Holding Company Limited =

Electricity board in India

Bihar State Power Holding Company Limited (BSPHCL)
- Formerly: Bihar State Electricity Board (BSEB)
- Type: Statutory body
- Industry: Generation, transmission & distribution of electricity
- Founded: 1 November 2013
- Headquarters: Vidyut Bhawan, Bailey Road, Patna, India
- Area served: Bihar
- Key people: Ajay Yadav IAS (Chairman & Managing Director)
- Owner: Government of Bihar
- Number of employees: 14,850 (2012)
- Parent: Energy Department,Bihar
- Website: www.bsphcl.co.in//

Bihar State Power Holding Company Limited (BSPHCL), formerly Bihar State Electricity Board (BSEB) is a state-owned electricity regulation board operating within the state of Bihar in India. BSEB was established in 1958 as a statutory corporation under the Electricity (Supply) Act, 1948. As of November 2012, BSEB has nearly 1,700 officers and 14,850 employees. The derated capacity comes to just 530 MW. The BSEB was unbundled on 2 August 2011. Power Finance Corporation was the main consultant for BSEB's restructuring.

BSEB formally started functioning as 5 companies on 1 November 2012, namely:

- Bihar State Power Generation Company Limited (generation business)
- Bihar State Power Transmission Company Limited (transmission business)
- North Bihar Power Distribution Company Limited (distribution business)
- South Bihar Power Distribution Company Limited (distribution business)
- Bihar State Power Holding Company Limited (apex holding company)

== Electricity generation capacity in Bihar ==
The installed electricity generation capacity in Bihar was 6384.88 MW as of April 2020. Once completed, the under-construction projects would take total electricity generation capacity in Bihar to over 12000 MW.

== Thermal power plants in Bihar ==
On 17 April 2018, Bihar state cabinet, headed by chief minister Nitish Kumar, gave its nod to handing over of Barauni Thermal Power Station, Kanti Thermal Power Station and Nabinagar Super Thermal Power Project to National Thermal Power Corporation.

=== Barauni Thermal Power Station ===
The current installed capacity of this power plant is 470 MW and in future the plant will have a total capacity of 720 MW with projects of 250 MW under construction.

Units 1, 2, and 3 (15 MW each) and Units 4 and 5 (50 MW each) have been retired from service because of their age and the difficulty of maintenance.

Unit 6 and 7 of 110 MW each were renovated by BHEL which also originally supplied equipments and are now operational.

New Unit 8 of 250 MW was inaugurated in January 2018. Unit 9 of 250 MW is under construction and expected to be operational by 2020.

There is another ongoing plan for new capacity addition of 500 MW (2×250 MW) to this plant. In March 2013, Central Government assured to provide coal linkage to Barauni Thermal Power Plant.

=== Barh Super Thermal Power Plant ===
The current installed capacity of this power plant is 1320 MW and in future the plant will have a total capacity of 3300 MW with projects of 1980 MW under construction.

The project comprises two stages. The EPC contractor for State-1 of 1,980 MW (3×660 MW) is Russian firm TPE, and for Stage-2 of 1,320 MW (2×660 MW) is BHEL. Stage-1 being built with equipment from TPE is delayed as TPE is asking for more money. In November 2013, 660 MW unit 4 of Stage-2 being built by BHEL got synchronized with the grid. Commercial operation started in November 2014 after resolving faults. Unit 5 of Stage-2 is also now operational.

=== Buxar thermal power plant ===
This is an upcoming power plant with a planned capacity of 1320 MW. Larsen & Toubro Limited holds the contract for the construction, at an estimated cost of ₹7,490 crores. It is scheduled to open in 2023.

=== Kahalgaon Super Thermal Power Station ===
The current installed capacity of this power plant is 2340 MW and it is located in Kahalgaon, Bhagalpur, Bihar.

=== Kanti Thermal Power Station ===
The current installed capacity of this power plant is 610 MW

Units 1 & 2 of 110 MW, originally commissioned in 1985–86, went down in 2002–2003 and were renovated by Bharat Heavy Electricals who originally supplied equipment to these two units.

Units 3 & 4 are of 195 MW each. The plant is also known as George Fernandes Thermal Power Plant Station.

=== Nabinagar Super Thermal Power Project ===
The current installed capacity of this power plant is 660 MW and in future the plant will have a total capacity of 4380 MW with projects of 3720 MW under construction.

Nabinagar Power Generation Company Ltd (NPGCL), a 50:50 joint venture of NTPC Ltd and BSEB, is setting up the 4,380 MW (660 MW X 3), which will start generating electricity from December 2017. The project's generation capacity initially was to be 3960 MW but in 2016, the production capacity was increased to 4380 MW. Nabinagar Supercritical Thermal Power Project (STPP) in Nabinagar, Aurangabad, Bihar. BHEL won a ₹ 2,854-crore contract for supply of the steam generator package for three coal-fired thermal units of 660 MW each with supercritical parameters. TRF Ltd, a Tata Group company, has won a ₹ 360.47-crore order from Nabinagar Power Generating Company Pvt. Ltd for designing, engineering, manufacturing, supplying, erecting, testing and commissioning of a coal handling plant for a 3 × 660 MW coal-based super thermal power project coming up at Nabinagar. The coal handling plant will be designed to run at a capacity of 3,630 tons per hour. In March 2013, Alstom was awarded a contract worth approximately $115 million by BHEL, to supply components for three units of 660 MW supercritical boilers of NPGCL. Alstom India will supply transformers for NTPC's Supercritical Nabinagar Power Project, by winning a ₹105 crore order that covers design, engineering, manufacture, supply, testing, erection and commissioning of generator transformers and associated power transformers and shunt reactor. The Nabingar power transformer package is due to be delivered by October 2017.

=== Nabinagar Thermal Power Project ===
The current installed capacity of this power plant is 750 MW and in future the plant will have a total capacity of 1000 MW with projects of 250 MW under construction.

== Hydel power stations in Bihar ==
=== Koshi Hydel Power Station ===
Koshi Hydel Power Station which has an installed capacity of 19.2 MW (4x4.8) has been handed over to Bihar State Hydel Power Corporation on 11 November 2003.

== Bihar Grid Company Limited ==
Bihar Grid Company Limited (BGCL) is a joint venture of Bihar State Power Holding Company Limited (BSPHCL) and Power Grid Corporation to expand and strengthen electricity transmission in Bihar.

=== Power grids in Patna ===
- Fatuha (150MVA)
- Khagaul (150MVA)
- Mithapur (100MVA)
- Gaighat (100MVA)
- Katra (100MVA)
- Jakkanpur (170MVA)
- Digha (100MVA)
- Sipara (100MVA)
- Karbigahiya (132/33 KV)

There are 45 power sub-stations. The eight grids supply around 500 MW of power to the state capital.

=== Power grid substations in North Bihar ===
- Muzaffarpur (400/ 220 kV)
- Purnia (400/220 kV)
- Kishanganj (220/132 kV)
- Gopalganj (220/132KV)
- Areraj – East Champaran (400/132 kV)
- Darbhanga (400/220 kV)

There are six grid substations in North Bihar.

== Forthcoming power plants in Bihar ==
- The first private sector thermal plant in Bihar will become operational by April 2014. The first unit of (2×640 MW) thermal power plant, situated near Bausa block in Banka district is being constructed by M/s JAS Infrastructure Capital Pvt Ltd.
- Central Electricity Authority has recommended setting up of Bihar's first 4,000 MW ultra mega power project at Kakwara in Banka district.
- Bihar government has reiterated its resolution to make the state self-sufficient in power by 2015.
- Three, 1320 MW thermal power plants at Chausa (Buxar), Kajra and Pirpaiti (Bhagalpur) are in various stages of constructions.
- Chausa Power Plant in Buxar district is facing land acquisition related problem as of August 2014. Satluj Jalvidhyut Nigam is establishing a 1230 MW thermal power unit at Chausa in Buxar district.

=== Other projects ===
Upcoming Bihar thermal power plants:

- JAS Infrastructure Capital Pvt. Ltd (2 × 640 MW), Siriya, Banka district, Bihar
- Nalanda Power (2000 MW), Pipranait South, Bhagalpur District, Bihar
- Kanti Bijlee Utpadan Nigam (2×250 MW), Stage II – Kanti, Muzafarpur district, Bihar
- Bihar State Electricity Board (2×250 MW), Barauni, Begusarai district, Bihar
- Piranpaiti Bijilee (2×660 MW), Piranpaiti, Bhagalpur district, Bihar
- Lakhisarai Bijilee (2×660 MW), Kajra, Lakhisarai district, Bihar
- Buxar Bijilee (1320 MW), Chausa, Buxar District, Bihar
- NTPC (2×660 MW), Barh STPS, Patna District, Bihar

=== Nuclear power plant ===
The Government of India has decided to reduce the capacity of the proposed nuclear power plant at Rajauli, Nawada by half.

== Energy park ==
Karbigahia Thermal Power Station will be developed as the first-ever 'energy park' in Bihar.

== See also ==
- List of power stations in India
- State Electricity Boards
- Jharkhand State Electricity Board
