= Barauni Thermal Power Station =

Building in India

NTPC Barauni
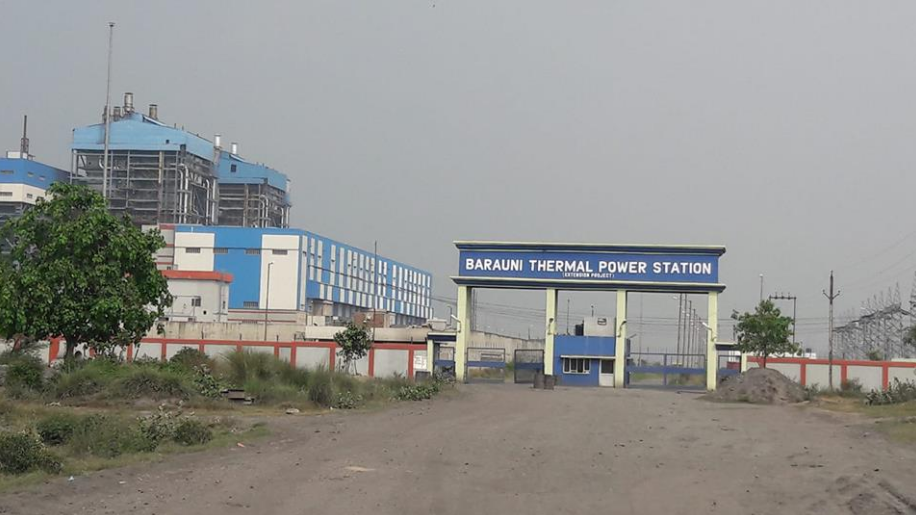
- Official name: NTPC, Barauni
- Country: India
- Location: NH 31 Barauni Bihar
- Coordinates: 25.392°N 86.024°E
- Status: Operational
- Commission date: 26 January 1960
- Owners: Government of India, (formerly Government of Bihar )
- Operator: NTPC

Thermal power station
- Primary fuel: Coal

Power generation
- Units operational: 2X 250 MW
- Nameplate capacity: 500 MW

National Thermal Power Station

NTPC, Barauni Or Barauni Thermal Power Station is a 500-megawatt coal-fired power station earlier owned by Bihar State Electricity Board (BSEB) and currently by NTPC Limited. The power station is located at Barauni in Begusarai district, Bihar, India. Barauni thermal power station in Bihar came into existence in association with the Russian collaboration and came into operation in 1962. Bihar Government was mulling over the idea to hand over Barauni Thermal Power Station to NTPC Limited. On 17 April 2018, Bihar state cabinet, headed by chief minister Nitish Kumar, gave its nod to handing over of Barauni Thermal Power Station to National Thermal Power Corporation. On 15 May 2018, Bihar Government signed a memorandum of understanding (MoU) to hand over the thermal plant to National Thermal Power Corporation for a 33- years lease. East Central Railway will provide uninterrupted supply of coal to thermal power station. NTPC completed the acquisition of 720 MW Barauni thermal power plant with effect from 15 December 2018. Unit-6 & 7 (2× 110 MW) retired w.e.f. 31 March 2024. The units (8 & 9) of Barauni power station will be progressively put under commercial operation.

== History ==
The Barauni Thermal Station was established with the technical help of Yugoslavia and Poland, while the USA helped finance the project. The foundation stone of the Barauni station was laid by late Dr. Krishna Singh, first Chief Minister of Bihar on January 26, 1960.

Unit No. 1, 2 & 3 of 15 MW units at the plant, which were commissioned in the early to mid-1960s have been decommissioned. Barauni Thermal power station was set up in 86.85 acres, ash yard was set up in 340 acres and Residential colony was set up in 139.25 acres.Unit III and II, supplied by a Yugoslavian company on a turnkey basis, was commissioned in 1963 while Unit I was commissioned by the end of 1966. All the three units were of 15 MW.The total capital investment was Rs. 6.7 crore. Unit III was shut down in 1983 after 1,13,013 hours and 39 minutes of operation and Unit I and II was shut down in 1985 after operation of 64,658 hours and 52 minutes, and 94,752 hours and 54 minutes respectively.

Unit No. 4 & 5 of 50 MW each, which are Polish made, Total capital investment in construction of both the units ran to 20.69 crore. Both the units were shut down in 1995 after operation of 1,07,399 hours and 21 minutes, and 76,150 hours and 49 minutes respectively." BSEB states that it proposed recommissioning the units but the Central Electricity Authority "declared revival/R&M of these units not Techno-economically viable." Thus these units stand retired.

To meet the rising demand and rapid growth of industry in the region, further extension of the power station was contemplated by adding two units of 110 MW each. The foundation stone for which was laid in 1976 by the Chief Minister of Bihar, Dr. Jagannath Mishra. Unit VI was commissioned in 1983 and Unit VII in 1985.Unit No. 6 which was supplied by BHEL was renovated & modernized.

Unit No. 7 which too was supplied by Bharat Heavy Electricals was also renovated. Commercial generation of 110 MW electricity started from Unit 7 on 4 November 2016. The unit started generation after NTPC takeover from 23.05.2019. The tariff of Barauni Thermal power station will be determined by CERC.

Commercial generation of 250 MW electricity started from Unit 8 in January 2018. While commercial generation of 250 MW electricity started from Unit 9 in November 2021.

In line with the corporate disclosure requirement under Regulation 30 of the SEBI (Listing Obligations and Disclosure Requirements) Regulations, 2015, operation of two Units (Unit 6 & 7) of 110 MW each permanently discontinued w.e.f. 31st March 2024.

== Capacity ==
Unit#	Installed Capacity (MW)	Date of Commissioning	Status
1	15	1966 December	Retired
2	15	1963 August	Retired
3	15	1963 February	Retired
4	50	1969 October	Retired
5	50	1971 October	Retired
6	110	1983 November	Retired
7	110	1985	Retired
8	250	2018 January	Running
9	250	2021 June	Running

== See also ==
- Bihar State Power Holding Company Limited
- Kanti thermal power station
