= Silaut railway station =

Railway station in Bihar, India

Silaut

General information
- Location: Raghunathpur, Silaut, Muzaffarpur district, Bihar; India
- Coordinates: 26°02′56″N 85°26′36″E
- Elevation: 58 metres (190 ft)
- System: Indian Railways station
- Owner: Indian Railways
- Line: Samastipur–Muzaffarpur line
- Platforms: 2
- Tracks: 2

Construction
- Structure type: Standard (on ground)
- Parking: Yes

Other information
- Status: Functioning
- Station code: SLT
- Zone(s): East Central Railway zone
- Division(s): Samastipur

History
- Opened: 1886

Services
| Preceding station | Indian Railways | Following station |
|---|---|---|
| Siho towards ? | East Central Railway zone Samastipur–Muzaffarpur section | Narayanpur Anant towards ? |
Location
- Location within India Location within Bihar

Silaut railway station (station code: SLT), is a railway station on Samastipur–Muzaffarpur line under the Samastipur railway division of the East Central Railway zone. The railway station is situated at Raghunathpur, Silaut in Muzaffarpur district of the Indian state of Bihar.
