= Barauni–Raxaul and Jainagar Lines =

Railway line in India

Barauni—Raxaul and Jainagar Lines
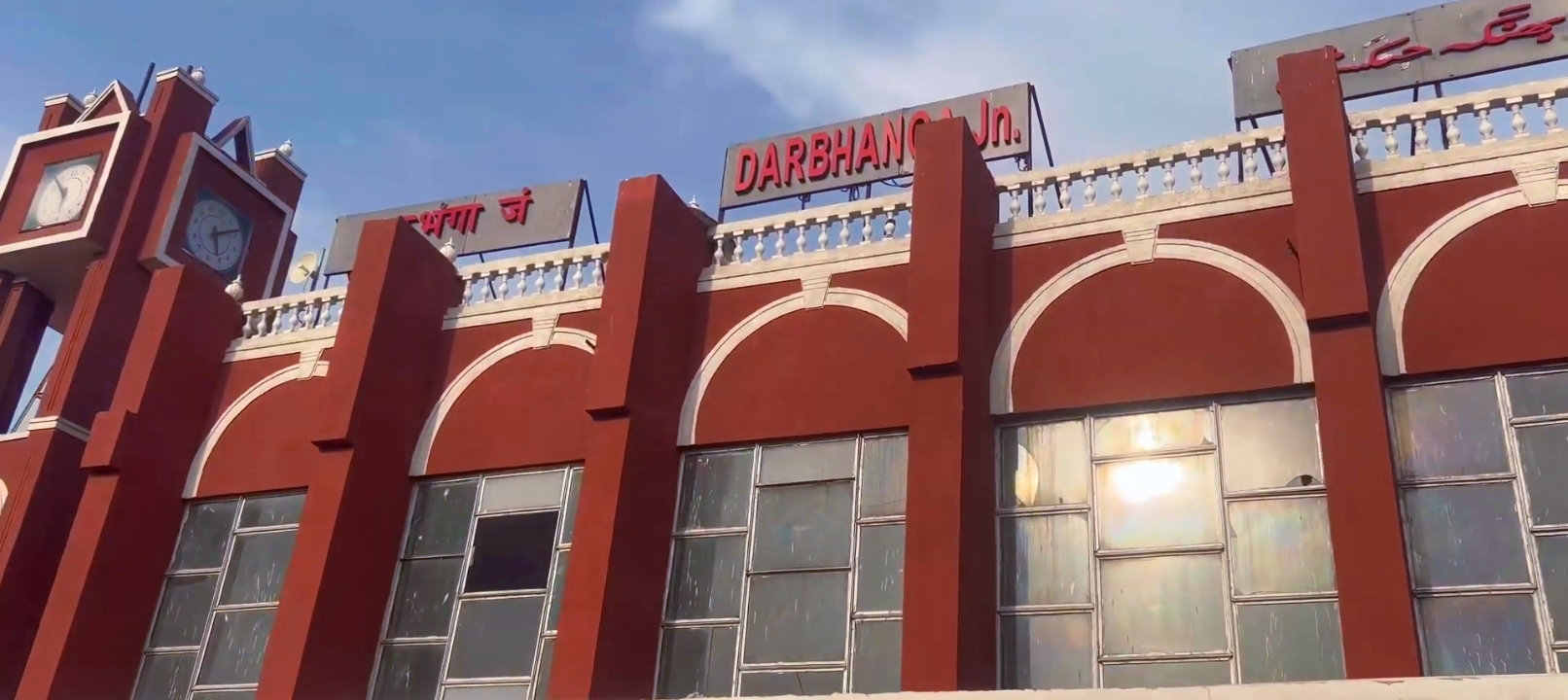
- Darbhanga Junction railway station is an important railway station on Barauni—Raxaul and Jainagar lines

Overview
- Status: Operational
- Owner: Indian Railways
- Locale: Bihar
- Termini: Barauni; Raxaul And Jainagar

Service
- Operator(s): East Central Railway

Technical
- Track gauge: 5 ft 6 in (1,676 mm) broad gauge
- Electrification: Yes
- Operating speed: 100 km/h (60 mph)

Barauni–Raxaul and Jainagar Lines connecting from Barauni to Raxaul and Jainagar. Barauni to Raxaul line is via Samastipur, Darbhanga, and Sitamarhi, and Barauni to Jainagar line is via Samastipur, Darbhanga, and Madhubani.

The lines run in central - north direction between Bagmati and India–Nepal border, covering North Bihar west of the Kosi river.

The lines have interconnections between them and the northern line has extensions to places near the India–Nepal border.

== History ==
Railway lines in the area were pioneered by Tirhut Railway and the Bengal and North Western Railway lines in the 19th century. In his book The Indian Empire, Its People, History and Products (first published in 1886) W.W.Hunter, says "The Tirhut State Railway with its various branches intersects Northern Behar and is intended to extend to the Nepal frontier on one side and to Assam on the other."

The area was developed with metre-gauge tracks. The 229 km (142 mi) Samastipur–Narkatiaganj loop was developed in stages between 1875 and 1907. The Samastipur–Darbhanga line was opened for famine relief in 1874 and opened to the public on 1 November 1875. The 72 km (45 mi)-long Nirmali branch (Darbhanga–Nirmali) between 1883 and 1886. The Barauni–Bachhwara line was opened in 1883. The Bachhwara–Bagaha line was developed in stages between 1883 and 1907. The Sakri–Jainagar branch was opened in 1905. The 51 km (32 mi)-long Hajipur–Muzaffarpur line was opened in 1884. The 270 km (168 mi)-long Tirhut main line from Katihar to Sonpur was developed in stages between 1887 and 1901. The 105 km (65 mi)-long Chhapra–Thawe line was opened in 1910. The 320 km (199 mi)-long Chhapra–Allahabad line was developed between 1891 and 1913. The Maharajganj branch line was opened in 1907. The Siwan–Kaptanganj line was opened between 1907 and 1913. The 127 km (79 mi)-long Bhatni–Varanasi Chord was opened between 1896 and 1899. The Jhanjharpur–Laukaha Bazar line was opened in 1976.

The lines were converted to 1,676 mm (5 ft 6 in) broad gauge in phases starting from early 1980s. Samastipur to Darbhanga (metre to broad gauge) was converted around 1983. Siwan to Thawe (metre to broad gauge) was converted in early 2006. Gauge conversion of the 268 km (167 mi)-long Jainagar–Darbhanga–Narkatiaganj line that was started in 2011 was completed to Raxaul in February 2014 and to Narkatiaganj in 2017. The Sakri–Laukaha Bazar–Nirmali conversion is under process.

== Electrification ==
The electrification work was completed for the entire section in December 2014.

== Sections ==
- Barauni–Samastipur
- Samastipur—Darbhanga Section
- Darbhanga—Raxaul Section
- Darbhabga—Jaingar Section
