= Kanti Thermal Power Station =

Power station in Bihar, India

Kanti Thermal Power Station (NTPC Kanti)
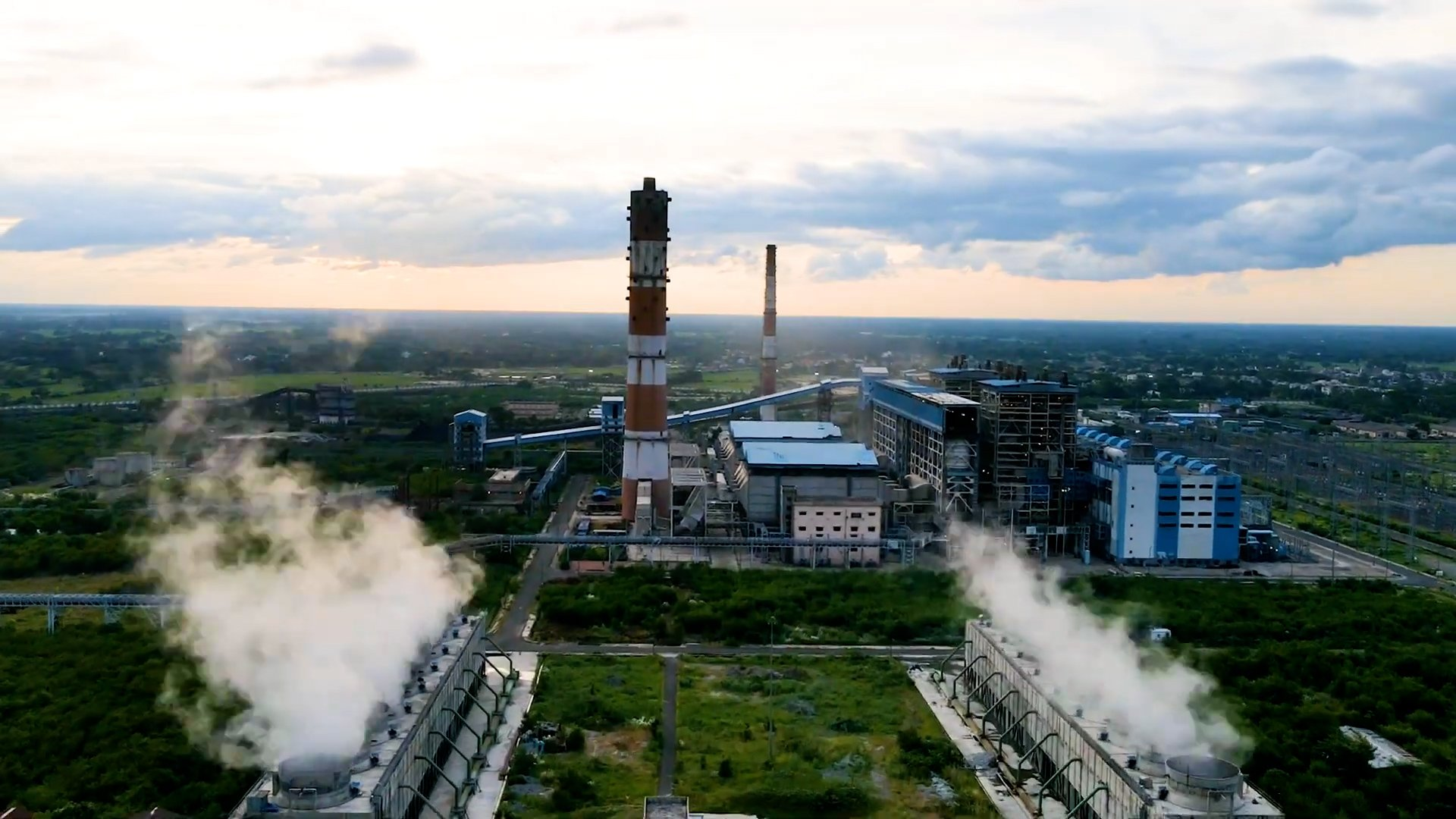
- Official name: Muzaffarpur Thermal Power Station, MTPS/KBUNL/GFTPS
- Country: India
- Location: Kanti, Bihar
- Coordinates: 26.07°N 85.24°E
- Status: Operational
- Commission date: 1985
- Owners: NTPC and BSPHCL or BSEB
- Operator: Kanti Bijlee Utpadan Nigam Ltd. (KBUNL)

Thermal power station
- Primary fuel: Coal

Power generation
- Units operational: 2 X 195 MW
- Make and model: BHEL
- Nameplate capacity: 390 MW

NTPC Kanti also known as George Fernandes Thermal Power Plant Station is located in Kanti, Muzaffarpur, Bihar. George Fernandes was former Member of Parliament from Muzaffarpur constituency of Bihar. It is wholly owned subsidiary company of NTPC. The share of the company is 100% of the NTPC. The plant was not functional between 2003 and 2013; however, renovation of both older units paved the way for commercial production of electricity by the end of 2013.

In November 2013, Chief Minister Nitish Kumar said that another new 500 MW power plant will be set up at Kanti. The first 195 MW unit was commissioned by BHEL at the 2×195 MW plant in March 2015.

The second unit of the 2×195 MW was commissioned on 13 June 2016. Muzaffarpur Thermal Power Station has an installed capacity of 610 MW. Another 500 MW extension has been planned. East Central Railway will provide uninterrupted supply of coal to the thermal power station. The electrification work between Kaparpura and Kanti stations will be completed.

== History ==
First started in 1985, Kanti Power Plant had an initial installed capacity of 110×2 MW. An additional capacity of 195×2 MW was erected in 2015–16. Kanti thermal Power Plant came into existence with the efforts of then MP of Muzaffarpur, George Fernandes. The construction of the plant began during George's first tenure as MP of Muzaffarpur in 1978. In November 2014, Kanti plant was renamed as George Fernandes Thermal Power Plant to acknowledge his contribution. To take over Muzaffarpur Thermal Power Station (2×110 MW), a subsidiary company named Vaishali Power Generating Company Limited with NTPC on 06/09/2006,-contributing 51% of equity; and the balance equity was contributed by Bihar State Electricity Board. The company was rechristened as ‘Kanti Bijlee Utpadan Nigam Limited’ on April 10, 2008. Present equity holding is 100% by ntpc and now it's not a joint venture but is a wholly owned subsidiary company of ntpc. The company renovated and modernized the existing unit.The total cost of its renovation and modernization has been over Rs. 500 crores.

In March 2013, the renovation work of two old units was completed. MTPS started commercial production from November 1, 2013, by supplying 94 MW. This is first generation in 11 years since 2002. On 17 April 2018, Bihar state cabinet, headed by chief minister Nitish Kumar, gave its nod to handing over of Kanti Thermal Power Station to National Thermal Power Corporation. On 15 May 2018, Bihar Government signed a memorandum of understanding (MoU) to hand over the thermal plant to National Thermal Power Corporation for a 33- years lease.

In May 2023, NTPC Kanti secured the first position in Bihar and tenth position in India among power generation corporations, in terms of better plant load factor in the rankings released by Central Electricity Authority (India). Its plant load factor stood at 87.58%.

== Capacity ==
Stage	Unit number	Installed capacity (MW)	Date of commissioning	Status	Notes
Stage-1	1	110	March 1985, recommissioned November 2013	Under dismantling	This unit went down in 2003 and then its renovation started by Bharat Heavy Electricals in April 2008 and was running at full capacity since November 2013 till 2022. Being old unit the same was decided to scrap down.
Stage-1	2	110	March 1986, recommissioned November 2014	Under dismantling	This unit too is non functional since 2003 and was also renovated by Bharat Heavy Electricals. But, since November 2014 this unit has been functional after the renovation and modernization work and was running at full capacity till 2022. Being old unit the same was decided to scrap down.
Stage-2	3	195	5 May 2015	Operational	The original planned capacity of the unit was 250 MW but was reduced to 195 MW Scheduled after Airport Authority of India raised concern over its chimney height. Bhel commissioned the first 195 MW unit at Muzaffarpur Thermal Power Station in India on 5 May 2015. The commissioning is the first of the two units at 390 MW Muzaffarpur Thermal Power Station (TPS).
Stage-2	4	195	13 June 2016	Operational	Original planned capacity was 250 MW but reduced to 195 MW. Total installed capacity becomes 610 MW.
Total		610			

== See also ==
- Bihar State Power Holding Company Limited
- NTPC Limited
- Barauni Thermal Power Station
- Kahalgaon Super Thermal Power Station
- Barh Super Thermal Power Station
