= Barauni =

- Town
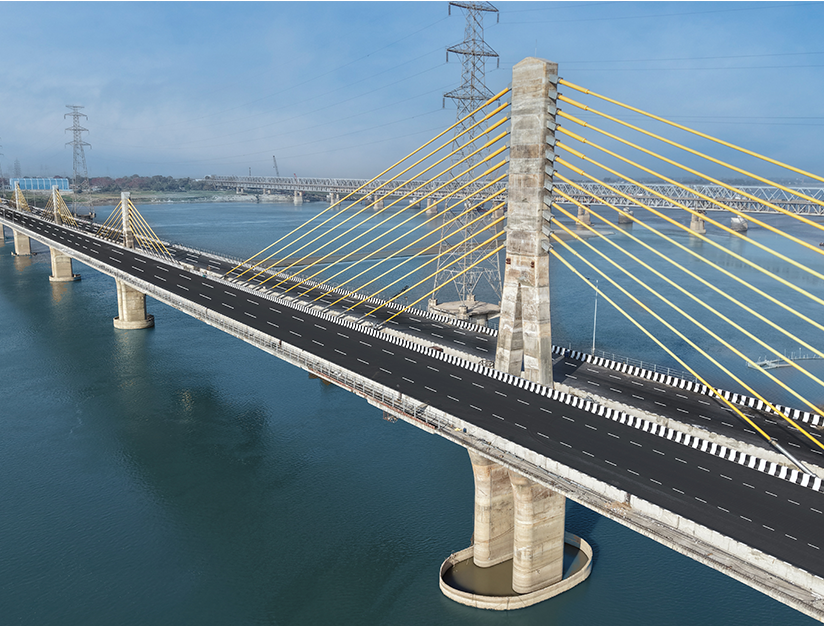
- Barauni—Mokama six-lane cable bridge

- Location in Bihar, India
- Coordinates: 25.466°N 85.987°E
- Country: India
- State: Bihar
- District: Begusarai

Government
  - Type: Nagar parishad
  - Body: Barauni Nagar Parishad and Bihat Nagar Parishad

Area
  - Town: 50 km^{2} (19 sq mi)
  - Urban: 150 km^{2} (58 sq mi)

Population
  - Urban: 150,000

Language
  - Official: Hindi
  - Additional official: Urdu
  - Regional languages: Maithili
- Time zone: UTC+5:30 (IST)
- Pincode(s): 8511xx
- STD Code(s): 06279
- Vehicle registration: BR-09
- Lok Sabha constituencies: Begusarai (Lok Sabha constituency)
- Vidhan Sabha constituencies: Teghra Assembly constituency

Barauni is an industrial town situated on the bank of the river Ganges in the Begusarai district in the state of Bihar, India. It lies north of the Ganges (Ganga) River.

== Economy ==
=== Industries ===
There are many small and large industries and Plants here. There is old Barauni industrial Area near Zero mile (NH 31)and New Industrial Area near Barauni Block, who is under BIADA.

Some Major plants in Barauni include:

- Barauni Thermal Power Station (NTPC)
- Barauni Fertiliser Plant (HURL)
- Barauni Refinery (IOCL)
- PepsiCo Bottling Plant (Varun Beverages)
- Sudha Dairy
- Neo Carbon Pvt. Ltd.
- Ethenol Plant
- Prince Pipe pvt.Ltd.

== Transport ==
=== Railways ===
Barauni Junction is one of the most important junction station in Bihar and has strategic location. It is a major junction in North Bihar and is connected to India's main cities of New Delhi, Kolkata, Mumbai and Chennai via broad gauge routes. Barauni has three railway stations –

- Barauni Junction – where trains from Patna side enter and reverse to proceed towards North East (exception is for trains coming from Samastipur and Hajipur side where reversal is not needed),
- New Barauni Junction – at some distance in order to avoid reversal at the former. it is a bypass station of Barauni Junction which is directly connected to Patna and Katihar side.
- Barauni Flag – a small station on Barauni–Gorakhpur, Raxaul and Jainagar lines.

=== Roads ===
NH 122 (Old NH-28) starts from Barauni and leads to Lucknow via Muzaffarpur. NH 31 passes through the town and leads to Purnia and Guwahati in East and Patna in west. Both National Highways have junction here. Previously, it is the only route for Northeast India that's why it was called Assam Road.

=== Air ===
The nearest airport is Lok Nayak Jayaprakash Airport in Patna which is approximately 102 kilometres (63 mi) away while Darbhanga Airport is approximately 112 kilometres (70 mi) away.

== Notable people ==
- Ram Sharan Sharma

== See also ==
- IOC Township, Barauni
- Urvarak Nagar, Barauni
- Teghra Vidhan Sabha Constituency
- Begusarai Lok Sabha Constituency
- Barauni Assembly constituency
