= Khudiram Bose Pusa railway station =

Railway station in Samastipur, Bihar, India

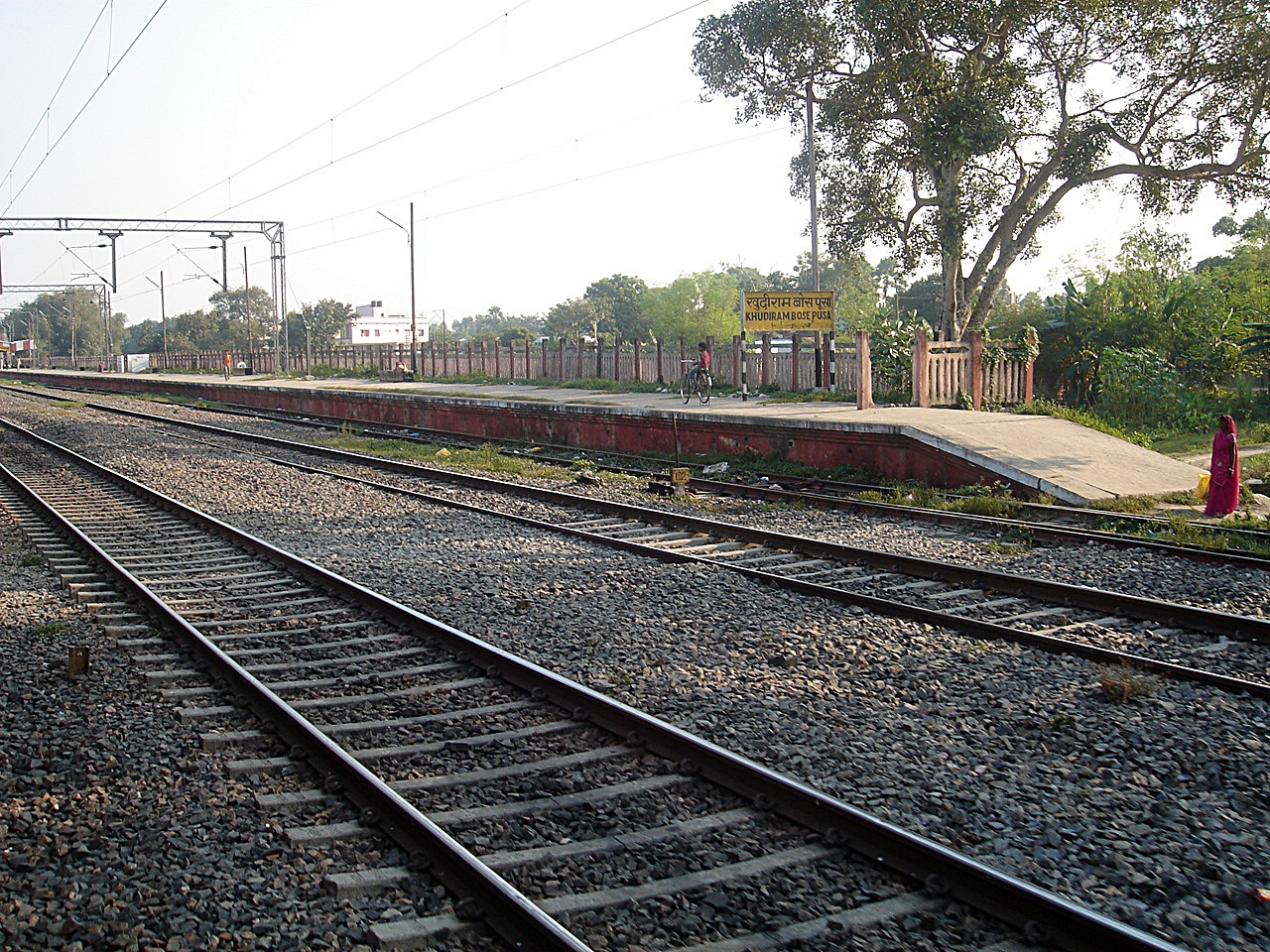
- Khudiram Bose Pusa station

General information
- Location: Pusa Station Rd, Khudiram Bose Pusa, Gangapur, Bihar-848131; India
- Coordinates: 25°54′16″N 85°40′25″E
- System: Indian Railways station
- Owner: Indian Railways
- Operator: Indian Railways
- Platforms: 2
- Tracks: 4
- Train operators: Indian Railways

Other information
- Station code: KRBP
- Fare zone: Eastern Central Railway (ECR)
Location
- Location within India Location within Bihar

Khudiram Bose Pusa station (station code: KRBP), is a two platform station located in Samastipur district, of the Indian state of Bihar, India with zero originating trains. It is 72 kilometres (45 mi) away from Patna Airport and 13 km (8.1 mi) from Samastipur Junction. Elevation is 52 metres (171 ft) above sea level and the station is in East Central zone (ECR) and comes under Samastipur railway division

== History ==
The station name was Waini railway station. Later it was named Pusa road Waini after establishing Dr Rajendra Prasad Agriculture University in Pusa. After few years Waini removed and known as Pusa Road for a long. After 1990s this station got renamed as Khudiram Bose Pusa Railway Station to honour the youngest Indian revolutionary freedom fighter to be executed by the British, Bengali revolutionary Khudiram Bose, who was caught here by two armed constables.

He reached the station after covering 25 km (16 mi) distance walking barefoot after bombing the carriage of Kingsford. The bomb hit its target successfully and the carriage blew up. However, the carriage was occupied not by Kingsford but instead by the wife and daughter of barrister Pringle Kennedy.
