= Sahadai Buzurg railway station =

Railway station in Vaishali district, India

Sahadai Buzurg Station

General information
- Location: Sahadai Buzurg, Vaishali, Bihar; India
- Coordinates: 25°39′40″N 85°27′18″E
- Elevation: 52 metres (171 ft)
- System: Indian Railways station
- Operator: Indian Railways
- Line: Barauni–Gorakhpur, Raxaul and Jainagar lines
- Platforms: 3
- Tracks: 5

Construction
- Structure type: Standard (on-ground station)
- Parking: No

Other information
- Status: Functioning
- Station code: SDG
- Zone(s): East Central Railway
- Division(s): Sonpur Railway Division

History
- Former names: East Indian Railway
Location
- Location within India Location within Bihar

Sahadai Buzurg railway station (station code: SDG), is a railway station in the Sonpur railway division of East Central Railway. It is located in Sahadai Buzurg block of Vaishali district in the Indian state of Bihar.

On 3 February 2019, eleven coaches of the Delhi-bound Seemanchal Express derailed at Sahadai Buzurg railway station, killing at least six passengers and injuring 37 others, railway officials initially attributed the derailment to a rail fracture.

== Platforms ==
The three platforms are interconnected with a foot overbridge (FOB)from platform no. 1 to platform 3. Ticket counters are available at Platform no 1.

== Nearest airports ==
The nearest airports to Sahadai Buzurg railway station are:

- Gorakhpur Airport, Gorakhpur 263 kilometres (163 mi)
- Gaya Airport 131 kilometres (81 mi)
- Lok Nayak Jayaprakash Airport, Patna 43 kilometres (27 mi)
- Netaji Subhash Chandra Bose International Airport, Kolkata 548 kilometres (341 mi)

== See also ==
- Shahpur Patori railway station
- Chak Sikandar railway station
- Desari railway station
