= Bhagwanpur =

Bhagwanpur may refer to:

== India ==
- Bhagwanpur (community development block), Vaishali district, Bihar
- Bhagwanpur, Bihar, a town in the Bhagwanpur block
- Bhagwanpur, Punjab, a census town in Jalandhar district
- Bhagwanpur, Bhulath, a village in Bhulath tehsil, Kapurthala district, Punjab
- Bhagwanpur, Kapurthala, a village in Kapurthala district, Punjab
- Bhagwanpur, Uttar Pradesh, a village in Kushinagar district
- Bhagwanpur, Uttarakhand, a town and tehsil in Haridwar district
- Bhagwanpur (Uttarakhand Assembly constituency)

== Nepal ==
- Bhagwanpur, Nepal, a village

== See also ==
- Bhagwanpura (disambiguation)
