= 2016 Bihar school examination scandal =

Education scandal in India

The 2016 Bihar school examination scandal or topper scam was a corruption scandal in the Indian state of Bihar which came to public light on 31 May 2016, when the Bihar School Examination Board (BSEB) Arts and Humanities topper (the top scholarly position in the examination) Ruby Rai, Science topper Saurabh Shrestha and third topper in Science stream Rahul Kumar were interviewed by television channels and they were unable to answer to basic questions. Ruby Rai, a student of Vishun Roy College, Kiratpur Raja Ram village in Vaishali district pronounced Political Science as ‘Prodigal Science’ and described it as a subject related to cooking. Science topper Saurabh Shrestha was unaware of electrons and protons and wrongly said that aluminium is the most reactive element.

== Background ==
The examinations in February–March 2016 were largely fair as the Bihar government, stung by the photos of mass copying in the BSEB-conducted exams in 2015, tried its best to prevent the use of unfair means. On 28 May 2016, the BSEB publicly declared the intermediate results, however, it released its official merit list for 10 May 2016 itself. Although, due to some issues, it made the results public at a later date. Only 56.73% of students passed in arts against 86.47% in 2015. In science, 67.06% passed versus 89.32% in 2015.

Some journalists visited Ruby Rai's house on May 30. When interviewed by the Aaj Tak TV channel, Ruby Rai and Saurabh Shresth were unable to answer basic questions. The arts topper Ruby Rai named "prodigal science" (actually political science) as one of the subjects she had studied. When asked what this subject dealt with, she answered that it was about cooking. She stated that the exam was for 600 marks, while it was actually of only 500 marks. The science topper Saurabh Shresth could not describe the link between water and H_{2}O (the chemical formula for water). He also wrongly named aluminium as the most reactive element.

== SIT Formation ==
After the video of their interviews went viral, a three-member SIT was formed by the Bihar state government to look into the fraud. Manu Maharaj, Patna special SP, was the head of the special investigation team with city SP , Patna Chandan Kushwaha as one of the member. Ruby and the other 13 rank holders were asked to appear for the test on June 3. Ruby Rai was later sent to judicial custody in remedial home for 14 days. Vishun Roy College was de-recognised thereafter. A day after retest, the results of toppers were canceled. Ruby Rai failed the retest for the first time. BSEB Chairman Lalkeswar Prasad Singh was on the run after that. On 6 June, Bihar government dissolved the four-member committee constituted by Bihar School Examination Board on 5 June to probe into alleged irregularities in evaluation of marks in Bihar intermediate exams and ordered registration of FIR. The decision to dissolve the committee was taken in a meeting when BSEB chairman Lalkeshwar Prasad Singh was also present in that.

Vishun Roy College principal Bachha Rai was arrested on 11 June. Bachcha's daughter Shalini Rai is also an accused in the fraud case. Bachcha had unsuccessfully lobbied for an RJD ticket from the Paroo (Vidhan Sabha constituency) in Muzaffarpur district in November 2015. Bachcha's daughter Shalini had topped the state in the matriculation exams in 2010. Her name was withheld as topper in Science stream and Saurabh Shreshtha was declared the topper in science stream. Bachcha's family are said to be die-hard supporters of Rashtriya Janata Dal. Ruby Rai's father is said to have promised six acres of land to Bachcha Rai in lieu of his "help" for his daughter.

On 8 June 2016, the BSEB chairman Lalkeshwar Prasad Singh resigned after being served a show-cause notice by the Bihar state's education department. On 25 June, Ruby Rai appeared before BSEB team for re-evaluation, and failed to answer a single question correctly. She was subsequently arrested. Patna Commissioner Anand Kishore took charge as BSEB chairman.

On 12 June, Bihar Deputy chief minister Tejashwi Yadav tweeted pictures of Bachcha Rai with Union minister Giriraj Singh. Tejashwi said Bachha Rai had a cordial relation with a central minister. Giriraj Singh also tweeted pictures of Bachcha Rai with Lalu Prasad Yadav and Nitish Kumar.

On 20 June, BSEB Chairman Lalkeshwar Singh and his wife Usha Sinha were arrested from Varanasi. Usha Sinha is a former MLA from Hilsa (Vidhan Sabha constituency) (2010–2015). BSEB chairman Lalkeshwar Prasad Singh confessed to having taken ₹20 lakh (US$21,000) from a cheating racket kingpin to help each unworthy student become a topper.

In the investigation, Ruby Rai said on June 27 that she just wanted second division, but her father Avadesh Rai made her topper in collaboration with Bachcha Rai. Ruby Rai was denied bail by the juvenile court on 13 July. The father of the science topper was arrested from the Kanti Factory Road area in east Patna on 15 July.

In an investigation of The Indian Express in July 2016, it was revealed that many schools are only on paper. Officials of G.A.Inter School Hajipur have also been interrogated. Third topper Rahul Kumar was also arrested in July.

On 15 July, Chief Minister Nitish Kumar said that the topper scam is a God-sent opportunity to rectify the system in Bihar.

On 9 August 2016, Vikas Kumar, who was a clerk-cum-storekeeper of the Bihar Vidyalaya Pariksha Samiti and kingpin of the racket in connection with the Bihar intermediate exam scam was arrested by a joint team of the West Bengal CID and Bihar police.

In September 2016, the Bihar government decided to link exams to Aadhaar numbers to avoid duplication and facilitate easy access to documents. The seven-member governing board led by BSEB chairman Anand Kishor approved the creation of 135 posts (official and clerical), the construction of nine new examination halls, and the setting up of nine regional offices. The 135 posts included nine deputy secretaries, nine accountants and nine zonal officers.

In October 2016, investigations revealed that Ruby Rai wrote names of movies on one answer sheet and the name of Tulsidas more than a hundred times in another and poetry in some others, which were then replaced. She wrote only 1 (home science) of 6 papers.

== Criticism ==
Many argued that Ruby Rai was unfairly targeted as she was a minor (17), as she was born on 15 November 1998 and the real kingpins of the crime and low education level of Bihar Board have not yet been caught. Central Education Minister Upendra Kushwaha said that Ruby Rai's father, Avadesh Rai, was complicit in the conspiracy forged by Bacha Rai. Referring to the specifically targeted media coverage of Ruby Rai and Saurabh Shrestha, columnist Shivanshu K. Srivastava wrote, "At least the news presenters should have shown some sensitivity towards these misguided children. In the context of another news wherein, a girl misbehaved in a police station, the girl’s face was blurred even when she was an adult, but these children are openly humiliated."

Ruby Rai was said to be under utter stress and finding herself utterly hopeless after deserted by family within few days of her arrest. On 13 July, Ruby broke down in tears in the juvenile justice board office after seeing her grandfather Munshi Prasad Rai. Later on, Ruby Rai was able to adjust and adapt herself inside the Juvenile Home. Her bail petition was heard in Juvenile court on 1 August. Ruby studied in the juvenile home to reappear in the 2017 exams. Ruby was released from jail on 1 August after the court agreed to her bail plea.

== Aftermath ==
BSEB introduced multiple steps to curb cheating in subsequent exams. Candidate's applications have been linked with the Aadhaar number to prevent duplications. To prevent impersonation, photographs were added at multiple locations, including the admit card. CrPC section 144 (curfew) was imposed at all examination centers to prevent others from roaming around the examination centers. CCTVs have been installed to prevent and identify those involved in such activities.

End-to-end digitisation was implemented: registration, form filling, evaluation, and declaration of results. Affiliations of 147 schools/colleges were canceled for not fulfilling the affiliation criteria. Some of the colleges were running in only one room.
