= Bhagwanpur railway station =

Railway station in Bihar

General information
- Location: Kiratpur Raja Ram, Bhagwanpur, Vaishali district, Bihar; India
- Coordinates: 25.858317°N 85.30109°E
- Elevation: 57 metres (187 ft)
- System: Indian Railway Station
- Owner: Indian Railways
- Line: Muzaffarpur–Hajipur section
- Platforms: 2
- Tracks: 2

Construction
- Structure type: Standard (on ground station)
- Parking: No
- Cycle facilities: No

Other information
- Status: Functioning
- Station code: BNR
- Zone(s): East Central Railway
- Division(s): Sonpur railway division

History
- Opened: 2009

Services
Preceding station	Indian Railways	Following station
Benipatti Pirapur towards ?	East Central Railway zone Muzaffarpur–Hajipur section	Bithauli towards ?
Location

Bhagwanpur railway station is a railway station on the Muzaffarpur–Hajipur section in East Central Railway under Sonpur railway division of Indian Railways. The railway station is situated at Kiratpur Raja Ram, Bhagwanpur in Vaishali district of the Indian state of Bihar.
