= Subdivisions of Vaishali district =

The following is a list of subdivisions in the Vaishali district of Bihar in the State of India. The total area of the Vaishali district is 2,036 km^{2}. This includes 1,998.48 km^{2} of rural area and 37.52 km^{2} of urban area. Vaishali has a population of 34,95,021 and the area is further divided into subdivisions for administrative purposes.

== Subdivisions in Vaishali district ==
- Hajipur
- Bhagwanpur
- Bidupur
- Chehra Kalan
- Desri
- Goraul
- Jandaha
- Lalganj
- Mahnar
- Mahua
- Patepur
- Paterhi Belsar
- Raghopur
- Raja Pakar
- Sahdai Buzurg
- Vaishali
