= List of villages in Rajapakar block =

As per the Census Department (Govt.of India), Rajapakar is a community block (sub-district code-10) of Vaishali district (Code-18) in the Indian State of Bihar (State Code-10). Following is the list of villages in Rajapakar block and their population as per 2011 census of India.

Vill.Code	Village Name	Population	Vill.Code	Village Name	Population
0001	Chak Dumri		0037	Madhopur Basu Urf Alipur	
0002	Mirpur Patanrh		0038	Chak Dumri	
0003	Makundpur Sisai		0039	Chak Dumri Khurd	
0004	Rampur Ratnagar		0040	Pokhrair Chausajh	
0005	Damodarpur		0041	Pachain Mahesh	
0006	Chak Ewaz		0042	Pachain Mobark	
0007	Bishunpur Ghanu		0043	Bhalui	
0008	Matiara		0044	Chak Rajo	
0009	Kalyanpur		0045	Baikunthpur	
0010	Fatehpur Phulwaria		0046	Rampur Dilawar	
0011	Bhojpatti Urf Bhedpatti		0047	Bishunpur Balbhadar	
0012	Rajepur Berai		0048	Rahim Alipur Urf Ehiapur	
0013	Tal Garha		0049	Pokhraira Khas	
0014	Madanpur		0050	Rasulpur Wali Urf Faridpur	
0015	Belkunda		0051	Chak Kalyanpur	
0016	Baijnathpur		0052	Bakhri Barahi	
0017	Birna Lakhansen		0053	Bakhri Mohanpur Urf Majhaul	
0018	Rampur Ram Khemkaran		0054	Chak Bakhri Barai Urf Chak D.	
0019	Karanpura		0055	Jafarpatti	
0020	Lachhmipur Bakhri		0056	Hasanpur Bakhri	
0021	Bishunpur Udho Urf Dumri		0057	Rasulpur Bakhri	
0022	Kutubpur		0058	Bakhri Subain	
0023	Lagurown		0059	Bariarpur Buzurg	
0024	Chainpur Mutaluke Makundpur		0060	Harpur Makund	
0025	Bhatha Dasi		0061	Bishunpur Sad Urf Bakarpur	
0026	Mohammad Saidpur		0062	Saikhpura	
0027	Bilandpur		0063	Govindpur Jhakhraha	1753
0028	Bakarpur		0064	Bishunpur Sad Urf Dabarkothi	
0029	Narayanpur Buzurg		0065	Gangajal	
0030	Suratpur Bidaya		0066	Bishunpur Bishunath Urf Telia	
0031	Rajapakar		0067	Sarmastpur	
0032	Basarha		0068	Harpur Hardas	
0033	Pachain Jagdish		0069	Rampur Barhamdas Mataluke Bis.	
0034	Kalyanpur Chausiwan		0070	Majhepur Alipur	
0035	Zahid Chak		0071	Rajepur Berai Sukhdal	
0036	Makhdumpur Banbira		0072	Berai	

== See also ==
- List of villages in Vaishali district
