= Kancha, Bihar =

Kancha
- Location in Bihar, India
- Coordinates: 25.63°N 85.75°E
- Country: India
- State: Bihar
- Division: Darbhanga
- District: Samastipur
- Block: Vidyapati Nagar
- Elevation: 50 m (160 ft)

Population (2011)
  - Total: 1,600

Languages
  - Spoken: Hindi, Maithili
- Time zone: UTC+5:30 (IST)
- PIN: 848503
- Telephone code: 91- 06278 XX XX XX
- Vehicle registration: BR-33
- Sex ratio: 1.0807 ♂/♀
- Lok Sabha constituency: Ujiarpur
- Vidhan Sabha constituency: Sarairajan
- Website: samastipur.bih.nic.in

Kancha is a village panchayat in the Samastipur district of Bihar state, India, at latitude 25.639962° and longitude 85.7589743°. Patna is the state capital for Kancha village. It is located around 63.1 kilometer away from Kancha. The other surrounding state capitals are Ranchi 257.2 km, Gangtok 340.9 km, Kolkata 431.5 km, The surrounding nearby villages and its distance from Kancha are Bangraha 2.2 km, Garhsisai 2.8 km, Badauna 5.2 km, Harpur Bochaha 5.3 km, Sahit 6.3 km, Sherpur Dhepura 10.0 km, Vidyapati Nagar 24.8 km, Maniyarpur, Simari.

== See also ==
- Samastipur
- Hajipur
- Bagmusha
- Lal Keshwar Shiv Temple
- Vidyapati Nagar
- Kacchi Dargah-Bidupur Bridge
- Shahpur Patori railway station
- Patna-Sonepur-Hajipur Section
- Khagaria Junction railway station
- Mohiuddinnagar railway station
- Hajipur-Muzaffarpur-Samastipur-Barauni Section
- Akshaywat Rai Nagar Railway Station
- Chak Sikandar Railway Station
