= Ghoswar railway station =

Railway station in Bihar

General information
- Location: Thathan Buzurg, Daulatpur, Vaishali district, Bihar; India
- Coordinates: 25.737421°N 85.243351°E
- Elevation: 54 metres (177 ft)
- System: Indian Railway Station
- Owner: Indian Railways
- Line: Muzaffarpur–Hajipur section
- Platforms: 2
- Tracks: 2

Construction
- Structure type: Standard (on ground station)
- Parking: No
- Cycle facilities: No

Other information
- Status: Functioning
- Station code: GWH
- Zone(s): East Central Railway
- Division(s): Sonpur railway division

History
- Opened: 2009

Services
Preceding station	Indian Railways	Following station
Sarai towards ?	East Central Railway zone Muzaffarpur–Hajipur section	Hajipur Junction towards ?
Location

Ghoswar railway station (station code: GWH), is a railway station on the Muzaffarpur–Hajipur section in East Central Railway under Sonpur railway division of Indian Railways. The railway station is situated at Thathan Buzurg, Daulatpur in Vaishali district of the Indian state of Bihar.
