= Turki railway station =

Railway station in Bihar

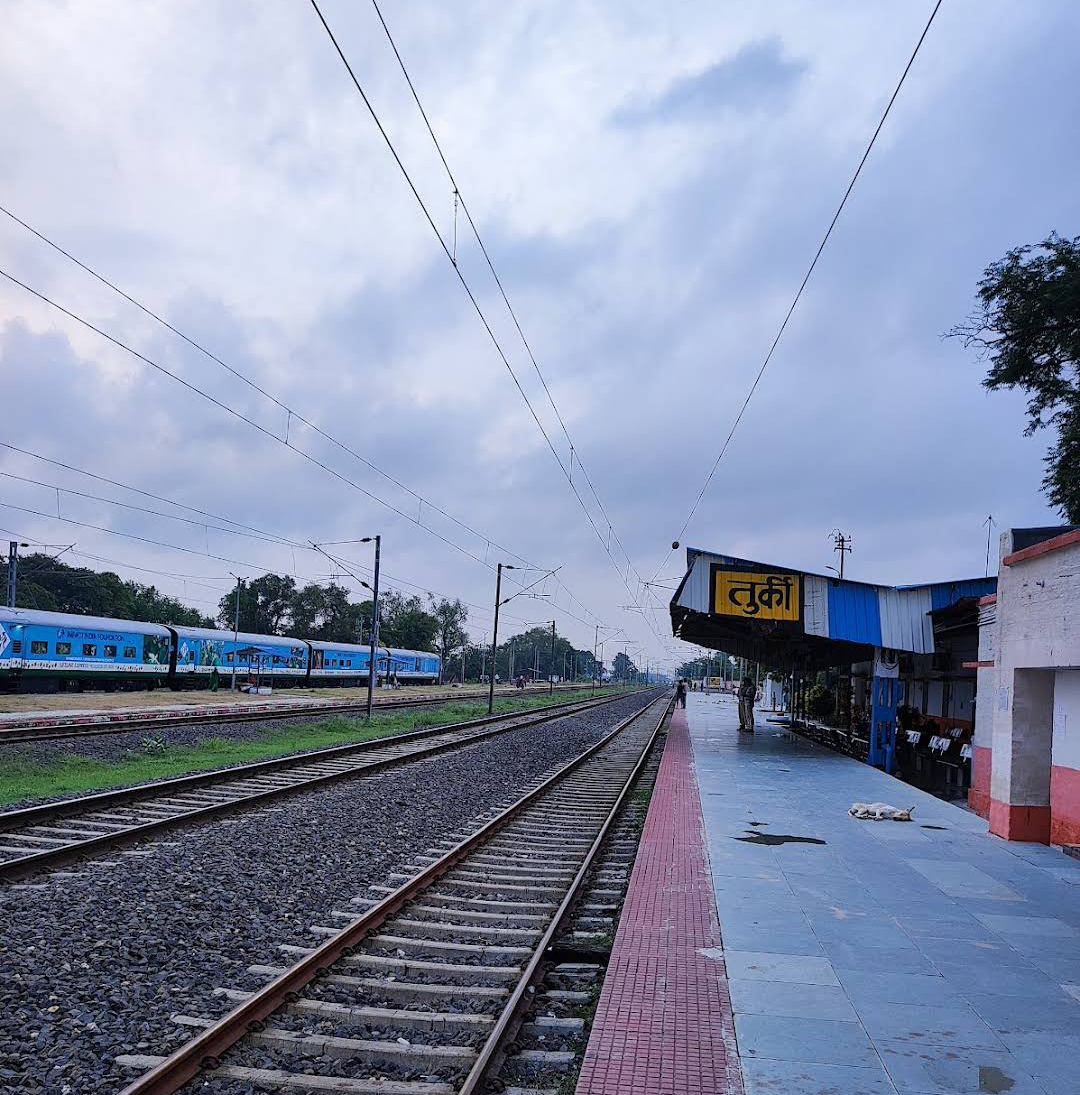

General information
- Location: National Highway 22, Block Road, Turki, Muzaffarpur district, Bihar; India
- Coordinates: 26.034431°N 85.354709°E
- Elevation: 55 metres (180 ft)
- System: Indian Railway Station
- Owner: Indian Railways
- Line: Muzaffarpur–Hajipur section
- Platforms: 2
- Tracks: 2

Construction
- Structure type: Standard (on ground station)
- Parking: No
- Cycle facilities: No

Other information
- Status: Functioning
- Station code: TUR
- Zone(s): East Central Railway
- Division(s): Sonpur railway division

History
- Opened: 2009

Services
Preceding station	Indian Railways	Following station
Ram Dayalu Nagar towards ?	East Central Railway zone Muzaffarpur–Hajipur section	Kurhani towards ?
Location

Turki railway station (station code: TUR), is a railway station on the Muzaffarpur–Hajipur section in East Central Railway under Sonpur railway division of Indian Railways. The railway station is situated beside National Highway 22, Block Road at Turki in Muzaffarpur district of the Indian state of Bihar.

== Turki – Silaut Bypass Rail Line ==
The construction work on the Turki–Silaut bypass rail line in Muzaffarpur has accelerated. The Turki station is planned to be developed as a railway terminal to reduce the traffic load at Muzaffarpur Junction. Once operational, this will help manage both passenger and freight train operations more efficiently.

Key Development Plans at Turki Station

Turki station will be upgraded into a terminal, which includes:

- Construction of washing pits lines for trains.
- Laying of sick lines (for train maintenance).
- Construction of stable lines for locomotive storage.

Additionally, there are plans to develop a new Muzaffarpur station somewhere between Chakbhikhi and Turki as part of the bypass line project.

Officials from various departments under the Sonpur railway division will conduct site surveys to finalize the development plans.

== Train Schedule at Turki (TUR) ==
The following trains are scheduled to stop at Turki (TUR) station:

Train No.	Train Name/Type	From	To	Arrival	Departure	Frequency
75212	SEE-SPJ DMU	Sonpur Jn (SEE)	Samastipur Jn (SPJ)	05:17	05:18	Daily
63267	MFP-PPTA MEMU	Muzaffarpur Jn (MFP)	Patliputra (PPTA)	08:24	08:25	Daily
55122	SV-SPJ Passenger	Siwan Jn (SV)	Samastipur Jn (SPJ)	09:13	09:15	Daily
63266	PPTA-DBG MEMU	Patliputra (PPTA)	Darbhanga Jn (DBG)	12:55	12:56	Daily
63265	DBG-PPTA MEMU	Darbhanga Jn (DBG)	Patliputra (PPTA)	17:10	17:11	Daily
55121	SPJ-SV Passenger	Samastipur Jn (SPJ)	Siwan Jn (SV)	17:55	17:57	Daily
75211	SPJ-SEE DMU	Samastipur Jn (SPJ)	Sonpur Jn (SEE)	21:25	21:26	Daily
63268	PPTA-MFP MEMU	Patliputra (PPTA)	Muzaffarpur Jn (MFP)	21:57	21:58	Daily
