= Govindpur Jhakhraha =

- village
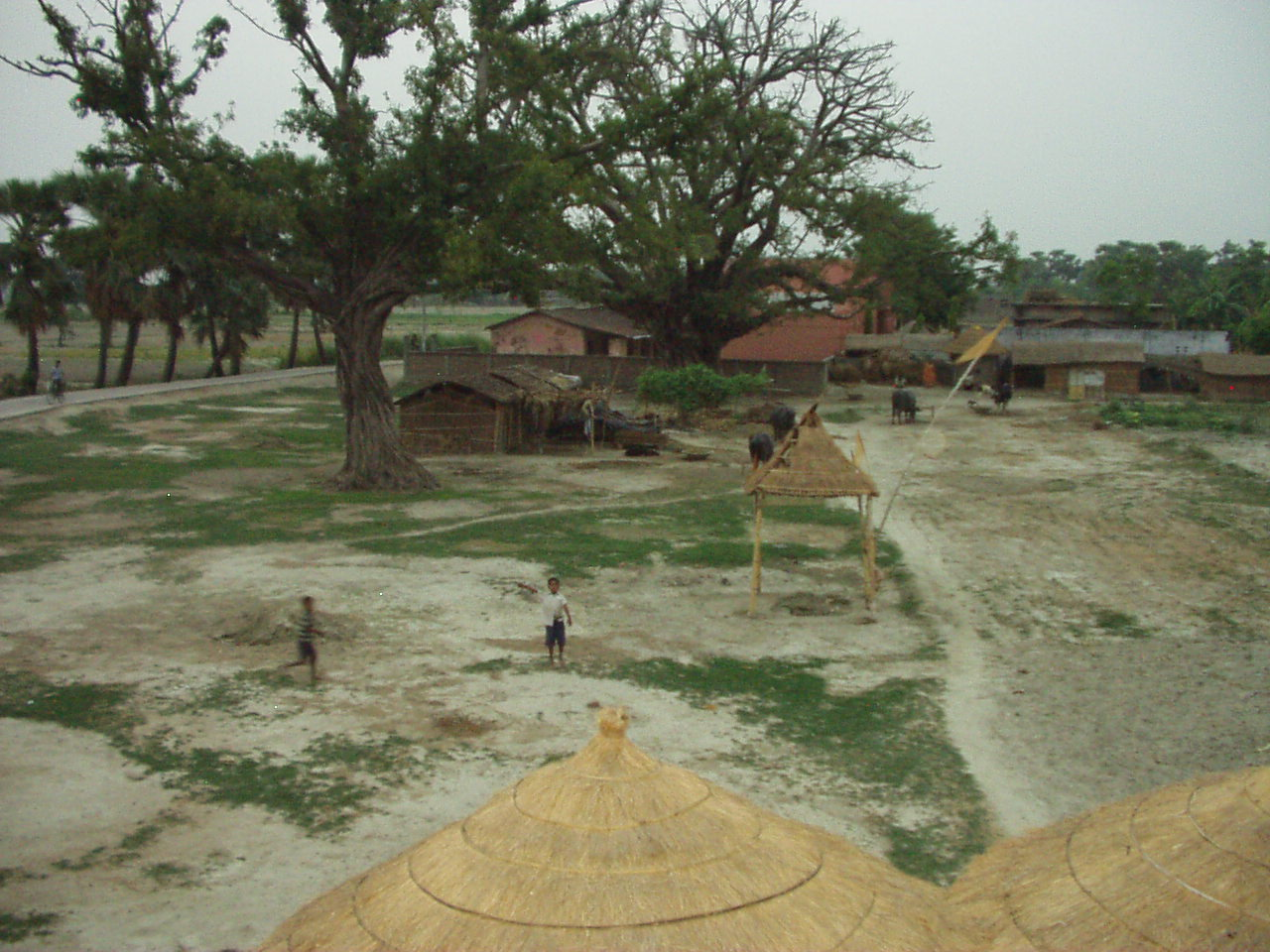
- Govindpur: A Panoramic view

- Location in Bihar, India Govindpur Jhakhraha (India)
- Coordinates: 25°41′10.5″N 85°21′56.5″E
- Country: India
- State: Bihar
- District: Vaishali

Government
  - Body: Panchayat

Area
  - Total: 0.9 km^{2} (0.35 sq mi)
- Elevation: 52 m (171 ft)

Population (2011)
  - Total: 1,753
  - Density: 1,900/km^{2} (5,000/sq mi)

Languages
  - Official: Maithili, Hindi
- Time zone: UTC+5:30 (IST)
- PIN: 844115
- Telephone code: 06229
- ISO 3166 code: IN-BR
- Civic agency: Panchayat

Govindpur Jhakhraha is a small village (approx. area 55 ha) in the historical Vaishali district of Bihar, India. It is located across NH 322 at 13 km east of district headquarters Hajipur. The village falls under Bakarpur Panchayat of Rajapakar community development block. The population of the village is approximately 1800. Bajjika is the main dialect but Hindi and Urdu is the medium of study. English is understood and spoken by a few elites of the village.

== Location ==
The district headquarters town of Hajipur and subdivisional town of Mahua are located at 13 km west and 18 km north, respectively. The villages is the part of Rajapakar assembly constituency. Approximate village area is 1 km^{2}. National Highway 322 passes through this village and connects Hajipur on one end and Musari Gharari via Jandaha on the other. The village is 35 km from the state capital, Patna.

The village is the part of the vast Gangetic plain having an average elevation of 52m above sea level. The surrounding fertile alluvial plain is covered with the greenery of banana, mango, litchi, sissoo, palm trees etc. Food grains and vegetables of all kinds are produced there. People prefer to grow wheat, paddy, maize, lentils etc. In addition to the cereals, vegetables and tobacco are grown as cash crops. Due to the high population density and continuous division of the families, area of farm land is very small. Nearly all farming is done for the subsistence of the family.

== Climate ==
The village has temperate monsoon type climate but extremes of winter and summer are experienced. During cold winter (December–January) and hot summer (May–June) months, people prefer to keep their business on hold. However, the monotony of hot summer is broken with lichi, mango and marriage. Fagun and Chaitra (February–March) are the months of Vasant (Spring) celebrated by worshipping Goddess Saraswati. Similarly, the mild weather of Ashwin and Kartik (October–November) is enjoyed with fervour of Durga Puja, Diwali and Chhath Puja. The Southwest monsoon arrives here during mid-June and accounts for most of the rainfall extending from June to September. The occasional rainfall is experienced with the retreating southwest monsoon before the start of winter.

== Demographics ==
As per 2001 Census of India, the population of village was 1260. Population statistics of Govindpur Jhakhraha as per 2011 census is as below:

| District Code | Sub district code | Village Code | No. of households | Total Population | Male | Female | Literacy |
|---|---|---|---|---|---|---|---|
| Vaishali (220) | Rajapakar (01277) | 235549 | 341 | 1753 | 937 | 816 | 59.67% |

== Culture ==
Village life is based on that of the Bihari society. It is divided and guided by the caste system. Family structure in the village is patriarchal and nuclear where parents live with their offspring. The economic status of most of the families is governed by their agricultural production and employment or business. Most families are below the poverty line; however, a few have acquired a well-to-do living. Although people live here according to the principle of co-existence and like to share happiness as well as their sorrow, mutual relationships are not as strong as they used to be a few decades ago. Being a dominant cast, Yadav has a major say in the interests of other communities living in the village.

Politically, the village covers two wards of the Bakarpur Panchayat. Earlier, village Panchayat was the main institution to resolve personal conflicts of villagers. Now, people prefer to use the service of local police as the decisions of the Panchayat are generally guided by personal interest. Mindful of the deteriorating condition of the age-old judicial system, villagers of Bakarpur Panchayat including others from the surrounding villages have formed a federation called Yadav Sangh Bakarpur. This non-political forum not only resolves the conflicts, it organizes regular meetings to monitor issues of common interest. The blacksmiths (Lohar) of this village, who were earlier engaged in repair and making of agricultural tools have almost abandoned their ancestral profession. The new generation do not find it lucrative and have shifted to job or other business. Similar is the situation of other small cast groups, who try to find their livelihood through new business.

Fairs and festivals play a major role in the cultural life of the villagers. Fairs are held in local markets in Dussehara and Muharram. Hindu celebrate Holi, Ramnavmi, Durga Puja, Diwali, Chhath etc. with much fanfare. Eid, Baqrid, Shabe barat and Muharram are celebrated by Muslims of the village. On the 10th day of Muharram, performances of martial arts by groups of Muslims and Hindus in large processions with Tajia provides an opportunity to see the cultural set-up of the village. Cinema and cricket is the main source of entertainment for youngsters.
Marriages are arranged by parents in the same cast. The dowry system is very common, based on the status of the family as well as the groom. Several males in the village having weaker economic backgrounds are forced to remain bachelors even if they agree to compromise on the issue of dowry. During marriage ceremonies, Purohit (priests), Nai (barber), Mali (flowerman) and Kumhar (potters) are called from neighboring villages.

== Education ==
An Utkramit (upgraded) Middle School is located in the village which imparts co-education up to 8th Standard in Hindi Medium. Despite a secondary school located in the village and a high school just 1 km away, literacy level is 59.67% which is lower than the national average. Situation is more skewed for female literacy. Large difference can be seen in educational level of villagers. While many are illiterate, few have acquired higher degrees in science, arts and professional field. Members of couple of families are graduated with PG, B.Ed., medical as well as engineering degree from Indian and Foreign University. Government Engineering College, Vaishali is located in the adjacent village of Fulpura which awards B.Tech and M.Tech Degree in seven engineering streams.

== Transport & Communication ==
=== Transport ===
The village can be reached by:

- Road: a network of road and rail transport exists in the village connecting it to other parts of the district as well as state and the country. Buses, taxis and auto-rickshaws connect this village to the state capital Patna. District headquarters town Hajipur is connected with the private and public road transport by NH 322.
- Rail: There is no rail line in Govindpur Jhakhraha; Chaksikandar is the nearest rail station at 1.5 km south of the village. Hajipur-Barauni branch route of ECR connects to other parts of the country. Important trains like Guwahati Rajdhani Express (12235/12236), Janseva Express (15209/15210), Lohit Express (15651/15652), Ballia-Sealdah Express (13105/13106) and other express trains passing Chaksikandar do not stop in the village. Train connecting national capital and other main cities in India are boarded at Hajipur Jn. Hajipur is the headquarters of East Central Railway Zone (India). 5 pairs of local trains running every 3 hour have stoppages in Chaksikandar. Train running information and timings of local trains passing Chak sikandar can be obtained from railindiainfo.com.
- Air: For air travel, the nearest airport is located in Patna at 35 km from here. Lok Nayak Jayaprakash Airport Patna has regular flights to and from Delhi, Kolkata, Mumbai and Ranchi.

=== Communication ===
- Telecommunication: BSNL is the only operator for the basic phone and broadband facility. Basic phone lines (STD code 06229) falls under Bidupur exchange of BSNL. Besides this, all major mobile phone operators viz. BSNL, Airtel, Vodafone Idea Limited and Jio are providing their services in the village area. The extensive coverage and expansion of telecommunication has augmented the development in the area but same can be blamed for restructuring of the age old social as well as family value system.
- Bank & Postal facility: Vaishali Kshetriya Gramin Bank is the only commercial bank operating in the village. The bank operates under the aegis of Central Bank of India. ATM of SBI and other banks are available in local market. Beside regular postal services, Post Office in Chaksikandar (PIN Code: 844115) also provides postal banking and insurance services.
