= Benipatti Pirapur railway station =

Railway station in Bihar

General information
- Location: Goraul road, Benipatti, Vaishali district, Bihar; India
- Coordinates: 25.892949°N 85.309048°E
- Elevation: 58 metres (190 ft)
- System: Indian Railway Station
- Owner: Indian Railways
- Line: Muzaffarpur–Hajipur section
- Platforms: 1
- Tracks: 2

Construction
- Structure type: Standard (on ground station)
- Parking: No
- Cycle facilities: No

Other information
- Status: Functioning
- Station code: BNPT
- Zone(s): East Central Railway
- Division(s): Sonpur railway division

History
- Opened: 1998

Services
Preceding station	Indian Railways	Following station
Goraul towards ?	East Central Railway zone Muzaffarpur–Hajipur section	Bhagwanpur towards ?
Location

Benipatti Pirapur railway station is a railway station on the Muzaffarpur–Hajipur section in East Central Railway under Sonpur railway division of Indian Railways. The railway station is situated beside Ghoraul road at Benipatti in Vaishali district of the Indian state of Bihar.
