= Madhaul Khurd =

- Village
- Location in Bihar, India Madhaul Khurd (India)
- Coordinates: 25°38′55″N 85°25′18″E
- Country: India
- State: Bihar
- District: Vaishali district

Languages
  - Official: Maithili, Hindi
- Time zone: UTC+5:30 (IST)
- PIN: 844504
- ISO 3166 code: IN-BR
- Vehicle registration: BR XX
- Website: vaishali.bih.nic.in

Madhaul Khurd is a village in Desri community development block in Vaishali district in the Indian state of Bihar. The main Post office is Desari and pin code of Madhaul is 844504

== Demography ==
The total population of the village is 1,010 as per 2001 census. The overall literacy rate is 68.86% . The female literacy rate is 50.51% while the male literacy rate is 85.1%.

== Education ==
The college in Desri Block named Sant Kabir Mahant Ram Dayal Das Intermediate Mahavidalay, Bidupur. GPS Madhaul Khurd is the government school in the village.

== Economy ==
The Village had been electrified under the Grameen Vidutikaran yojana.

== Transport ==
Desari railway station is the main railway station here.

== Culture ==
Apart from the language Hindi, the local language spoken by the people is Bajjika.

=== Festivals ===
Holi, Durga Puja, Deepawali and Chhath Puja are the prime festivals. People also celebrate Rakshabandhan, Janmashtmi, Shivratri, Makar Sankranti, Saraswati Puja and other local festivals.
