= Bithauli railway station =

Railway station in Bihar

General information
- Location: National Highway 22, Raghunathpur Imadpur, Bithauli, Vaishali district, Bihar; India
- Coordinates: 25.817069°N 85.29179°E
- Elevation: 58 metres (190 ft)
- System: Indian Railway Station
- Owner: Indian Railways
- Line: Muzaffarpur–Hajipur section
- Platforms: 1
- Tracks: 2

Construction
- Structure type: Standard (on ground station)
- Parking: No
- Cycle facilities: No

Other information
- Status: Functioning
- Station code: BTHL
- Zone(s): East Central Railway
- Division(s): Sonpur railway division

History
- Opened: 2009

Services
| Preceding station | Indian Railways | Following station |
|---|---|---|
| Bhagwanpur towards ? | East Central Railway zone Muzaffarpur–Hajipur section | Sarai towards ? |
Location

Bithauli railway station is a railway station on the Muzaffarpur–Hajipur section in East Central Railway under Sonpur railway division of Indian Railways. The railway station is situated beside National Highway 22 at Raghunathpur Imadpur, Bithauli in Vaishali district of the Indian state of Bihar.
