= Goraul railway station =

Railway station in Bihar

General information
- Location: National Highway 22, Ghoraul Bhagwanpur, Vaishali district, Bihar; India
- Coordinates: 25.931049°N 85.318477°E
- Elevation: 59 metres (194 ft)
- System: Indian Railway Station
- Owner: Indian Railways
- Line: Muzaffarpur–Hajipur section
- Platforms: 3
- Tracks: 5

Construction
- Structure type: Standard (on ground station)
- Parking: No
- Cycle facilities: No

Other information
- Status: Functioning
- Station code: GRL
- Zone(s): East Central Railway
- Division(s): Sonpur railway division

History
- Opened: 2009

Services
Preceding station	Indian Railways	Following station
Kurhani towards ?	East Central Railway zone Muzaffarpur–Hajipur section	Benipatti Pirapur towards Hajipur Junction
Location

Goraul railway station (station code: GRL), is a halt railway station on the Muzaffarpur–Hajipur section in East Central Railway under Sonpur railway division of Indian Railways. The railway station is situated beside National Highway 22 at Ghoraul Bhagwanpur in Vaishali district of the Indian state of Bihar.
