= Desari railway station =

Railway station in Vaishali, Bihar, India

Desari Station
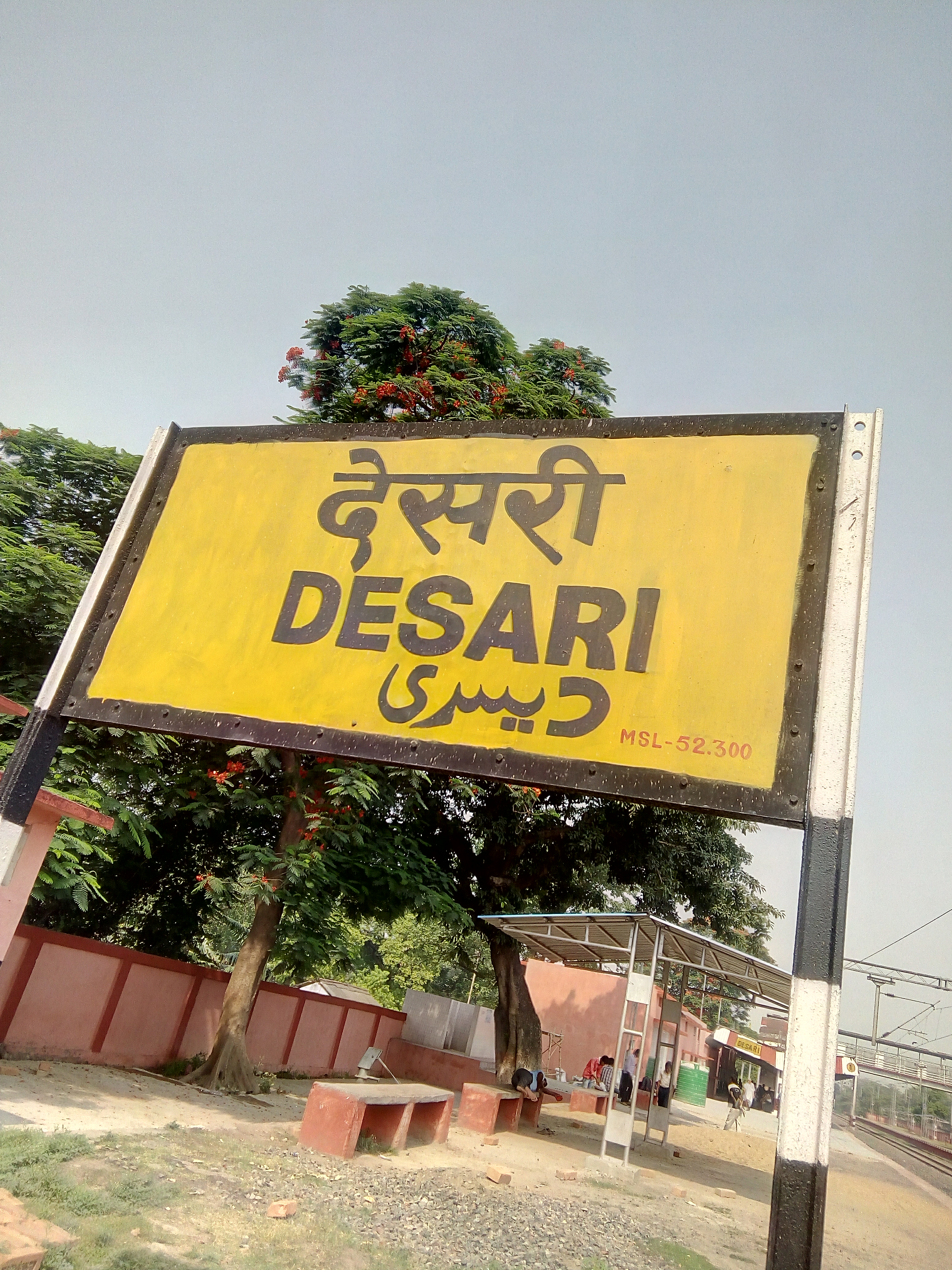

General information
- Location: Desari, Vaishali, Bihar; India
- Coordinates: 25°40′9″N 85°24′29″E
- Elevation: 55 metres (180 ft)
- System: Indian Railways station
- Line: Barauni–Gorakhpur, Raxaul and Jainagar lines
- Platforms: 2

Construction
- Structure type: Standard (on-ground station)
- Parking: No

Other information
- Status: Functioning
- Station code: DES
- Zone(s): East Central Railway
- Division(s): Sonpur

History
- Former names: East Indian Railway
Location

Desari railway station (station code: DES), is a railway station in the Sonpur railway division of East Central Railway. Desari station is located in Desari block in Vaishali district in the Indian state of Bihar.

== Platforms ==
The two platforms are interconnected with foot overbridge (FOB). Several express and passenger trains stop at this station.

== Nearest airports ==
The nearest airports to Desari station are:

- Gorakhpur Airport, Gorakhpur 258 kilometres (160 mi)
- Gaya Airport 126 kilometres (78 mi)
- Lok Nayak Jayaprakash Airport, Patna 38 kilometres (24 mi)
- Netaji Subhash Chandra Bose International Airport, Kolkata

== See also ==
- Shahpur Patori railway station
- Chak Sikandar railway station
- Sahadai Buzurg railway station
