= Sarai railway station =

Railway station in Bihar

General information
- Location: Majhauli Mohamadpur Buzurg, Sarai, Vaishali district, Bihar; India
- Coordinates: 25.779962°N 85.276609°E
- Elevation: 54 metres (177 ft)
- System: Indian Railway Station
- Owner: Indian Railways
- Line: Muzaffarpur–Hajipur section
- Platforms: 3
- Tracks: 6

Construction
- Structure type: Standard (on ground station)
- Parking: Yes
- Cycle facilities: Yes

Other information
- Status: Functioning
- Station code: SAI
- Zone(s): East Central Railway
- Division(s): Sonpur railway division

History
- Opened: 1883

Services
Preceding station	Indian Railways	Following station
Bithauli towards ?	East Central Railway zone Muzaffarpur–Hajipur section	Ghoswar towards ?
Location

Sarai railway station (station code: SAI), is a railway station on the Muzaffarpur–Hajipur section in East Central Railway under Sonpur railway division of Indian Railways. The railway station is situated at Majhauli Mohamadpur Buzurg, Sarai in Vaishali district of the Indian state of Bihar.
