= Lohit Express =

Train in India

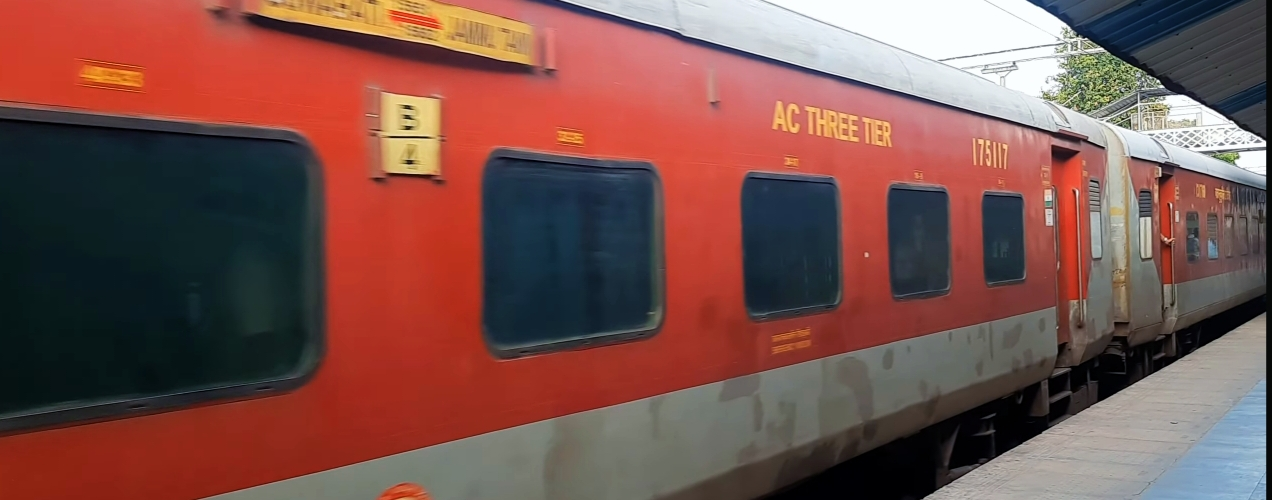
- Lohit Express At Ambala cantt junction

Overview
- Service type: Express
- First service: 1 May 1990; 36 years ago
- Current operator: Northeast Frontier Railway

Route
- Termini: Guwahati (GHY); Jammu Tawi (JAT)
- Stops: 40
- Distance travelled: 2,346 km (1,458 mi)
- Average journey time: 47 hours 10 mins
- Service frequency: Weekly
- Train number: 15651 / 15652

On-board services
- Classes: AC 2 tier, AC 3 tier, Sleeper class, General Unreserved
- Seating arrangements: Yes
- Sleeping arrangements: Yes
- Catering facilities: Available
- Observation facilities: Large windows
- Baggage facilities: Available

Technical
- Rolling stock: LHB coach
- Track gauge: 1,676 mm (5 ft 6 in)
- Operating speed: 130 km/h (81 mph) maximum, 50 km/h (31 mph) average including halts.

The 15651 / 15652 Lohit Express is an Express train belonging to Northeast Frontier Railway zone of Indian Railways that runs between Guwahati and Jammu Tawi in India.

It operates as train number 15651 from Guwahati to Jammu Tawi and as train number 15652 in the reverse direction, serving the 8 states of Assam, West Bengal, Bihar, Uttar Pradesh, Uttarakhand, Haryana, Punjab and Jammu and Kashmir.

It is named after the Lohit River which flows through the Indian states of Arunachal Pradesh and Assam and is 1 of 3 trains that connect Guwahati and Jammu Tawi, the other being the Amarnath Express and Kamakhya–Shri Mata Vaishno Devi Katra Express.

== Coaches ==
The 15651 / 52 Guwahati–Jammu Tawi Lohit Express has 1 AC 2 tier, 2 AC 3 tier, 14 Sleeper class, 4 General Unreserved and 2 SLR (Seating cum Luggage Rake) coaches. In addition, it carries a pantry car and some High Capacity Parcel Vans .

As is customary with most train services in India, coach composition may be amended at the discretion of Indian Railways depending on demand.

== Service ==
The 15651 Guwahati–Jammu Tawi Lohit Express covers the distance of 2,352 km (1,461 mi) in 47 hours 15 mins (49.78 km/h) and in 48 hours 45 mins as 15652 Jammu Tawi–Guwahati Lohit Express (48.23 km/h).

As the average speed of the train is below 55 km/h (34 mph), as per Indian Railways rules, its fare does not include a Superfast surcharge.

== Route & halts ==
The 15651 / 15652 Lohit Express runs through the following stations:

ASSAM

- Guwahati (Starts)
- Kamakhya
- Rangiya
- New Bongaigaon

WEST BENGAL

- New Alipurduar
- New Cooch Behar Junction
- Dhupguri
- New Jalpaiguri (Siliguri)

BIHAR

- Kishanganj
- Katihar Junction
- Naugachia
- Mansi Junction
- Khagaria Junction
- Begusarai
- Barauni Junction
- Mohiuddinnagar
- Shahpur Patori
- Mehnar road
- Desari
- Hajipur Junction
- Sonpur Junction
- Chhapra Junction
- Siwan Junction

UTTAR PRADESH

- Bhatni
- Deoria Sadar
- Gorakhpur Junction
- Basti
- Gonda Junction
- Lucknow NR
- Hardoi
- Bareilly
- Moradabad
- Saharanpur Junction

HARYANA

- Ambala Cantonment Junction
- Yamunanagar Jagadhri

UTTARAKHAND

- Laksar Junction
- Roorkee

PUNJAB

- Ludhiana Junction
- Jalandhar Cantonment
- Pathankot

JAMMU KASHMIR

- Kathua
- Jammu Tawi (Ends) .

== Traction ==
As the route is fully electrified, it is hauled by a Tughlakabad Loco Shed or Ghaziabad Loco Shed-based WAP-7 electric locomotive on its entire journey.

== Operation ==
15651 Guwahati–Jammu Tawi Lohit Express runs from Guwahati every Monday reaching Jammu Tawi on the 3rd day .

15652 Jammu Tawi–Guwahati Lohit Express runs from Jammu Tawi every Wednesday reaching Guwahati on the 3rd day.
