= S.K.J. Law College =

Law college in Bihar

Sri Krishna Jubilee Law College
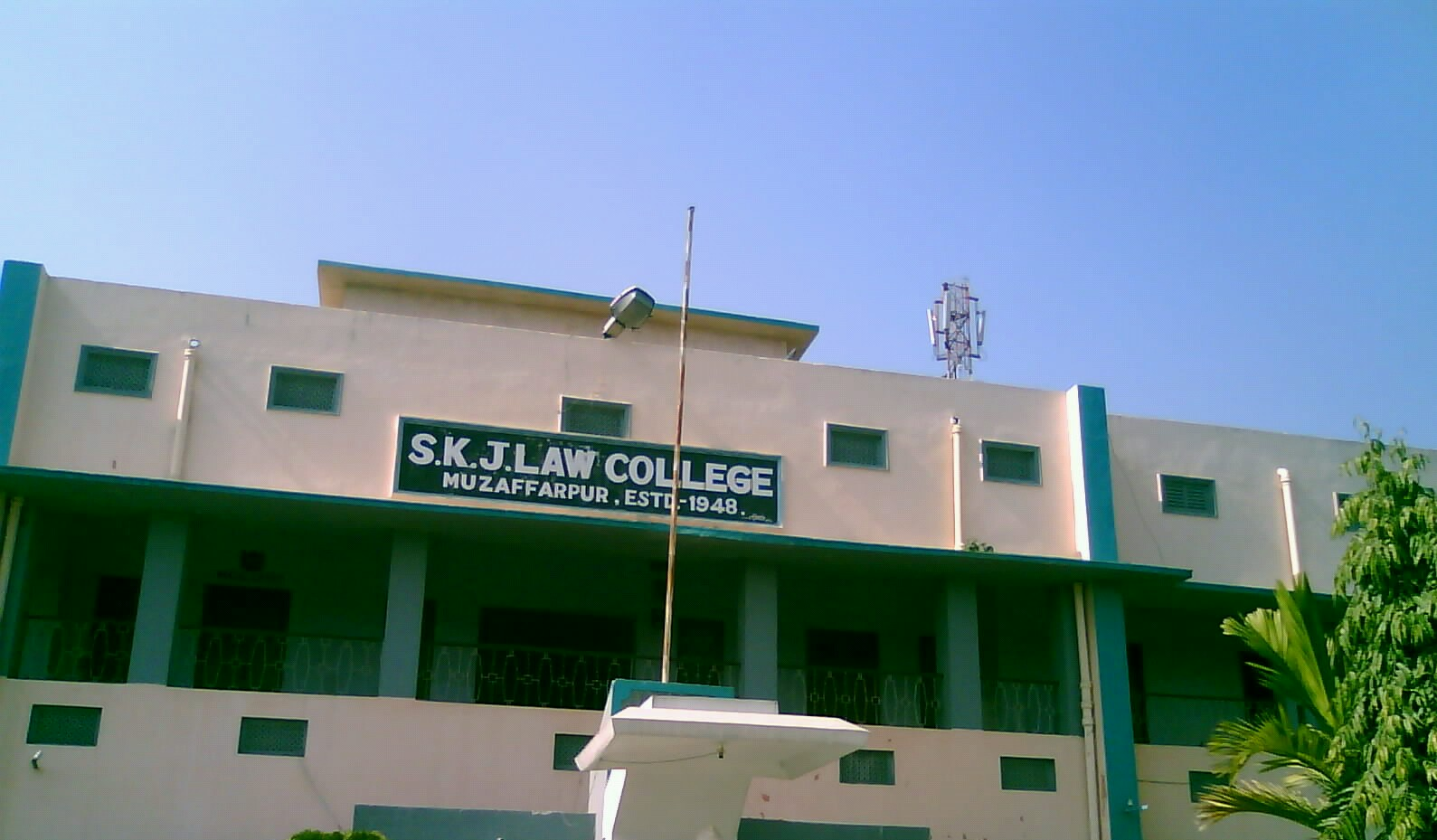
- Building of S.K.J Law College
- Type: Law College
- Established: 1948
- Affiliations: UGC; BCI; B.R.A.B.U; Accredited by NAAC with B+
- Principal: Dr. Prof. K. K. N. Tiwari
- Director: Mr. Jayant Kumar
- Location: Muzaffarpur, Bihar, India; 26°06′17.0″N 85°23′01.6″E
- Website: www.skjlawcollege.ac.in
- Location within Bihar Location within India

Sri Krishna Jubilee Law College is a law college, located in Muzaffarpur, Bihar which is affiliated and maintained by Babasaheb Bhimrao Ambedkar Bihar University (B.R.A.B.U).
The college was established in 1948, and named after Late Dr. Sri Krishna Singh, the first Chief Minister of Bihar after independence.

== History and Etymology ==
S.K.J. Law College, Muzaffarpur, was established in 1948 to commemorate the Diamond Jubilee of Bihar’s first Chief Minister, Dr. Sri Krishna Singh. The idea of founding a law college in Muzaffarpur was initiated by L.P. Shahi with the support of Mahesh Prasad Sinha and other local leaders. Initially, classes were held in B.B. Collegiate School with honorary teaching by senior advocates of the region. The college received temporary affiliation from Patna University in 1948 and permanent affiliation in 1951 up to the B.L. (Honours) standard.

Babu Kishore Narayan, senior advocate and former Chairman of the Muzaffarpur District Board, became the first principal. In 1965, the institution acquired land at Gannipur, where a permanent campus was constructed. The college shifted to this site in 1969. Over the years, infrastructure expanded to include lecture halls, a library, an auditorium, a guest house, and staff quarters.

The college has been managed by a governing committee since inception, with leadership passing from Mahesh Prasad Sinha to L.P. Shahi and later to others. It celebrated its Golden Jubilee in 1998 under Dr. Nageshwar Sharma. In the 2000s, further development included new academic blocks, a girls’ hostel, and sponsorship of a proposed institute of technology in Muzaffarpur.

== Administration and Journal ==
The current Director and Editor-in-Chief of the college is Mr. Jayant Kumar. The current Executive Editor and NAAC Coordinator of the college is Sri Ashutosh Kumar. The college was accredited Grade "B+" by NAAC for the term 2017-22. The college publishes its own journal named "Vidhi Darpan Law Journal". The functions regarding effective publication of journal is held and managed by the Director of the college (Editor-in-Chief) and the Executive Editor (senior-most active member). The functions of NAAC is headed and managed by NAAC Coordinator of the college.

== Courses ==
Course	Duration
LL.M.	2 Years
B.A. LL.B.	5 Years (Integrated)
LL.B.	3 Years

== Location ==
S.K.J Law College is located in Gannipur, Muzaffarpur.

Ram Dayalu Nagar Station is the nearest railway station to the college. From there people can reach easily, the distance is 950 metres or approx 1 km from Ram Dayalu Nagar railway station to the college.
National Highway 77 (NH 77) is the nearest national highway and road distance from Gannipur main road to college is about 180 metres (walking distance of approx 1 minute).

== See also ==
- Patna Law College
- Muzaffarpur district
- Bihar
- Education in Bihar
