= Chak Sikandar railway station =

Railway station in Vaishali, Bihar, India

Chak Sikandar station

General information
- Location: Chaksikandar, Vaishali, Bihar; India
- Coordinates: 25°50′9″N 85°39′3″E
- Elevation: 53 metres (174 ft)
- System: Indian Railways station
- Line: Barauni–Gorakhpur, Raxaul and Jainagar lines
- Platforms: 2

Construction
- Structure type: Standard (on-ground station)
- Parking: No

Other information
- Status: Functioning
- Station code: CSR
- Zone(s): East Central Railway
- Division(s): Sonpur

History
- Former names: East Indian Railway
Location

Chak Sikandar station (station code: CSR), is a railway station in the Sonpur railway division of East Central Railway. Chak Sikandar station is located at Bidupur block, within Vaishali district in the Indian state of Bihar. The station is elevated 53 meters above sea level, and contains two platforms. The Barauni–Gorakhpur, Raxaul, and Jainagar lines use Chak Sikandar Station.

== See also ==
- Desari railway station
- Hajipur Junction
- Akshaywat Rai Nagar railway station
