= Ahmadpur LakhnichakAulai =

- Village
- Ahmadpur LakhnichakAulai location in Bihar, India Ahmadpur LakhnichakAulai (India)
- Coordinates: 25°41′35.2″N 85°19′21.6″E
- Country: India
- State: Bihar
- District: Vaishali

Population (2001)
  - Total: 1,646

Languages
  - Official: Hindi
- Time zone: UTC+5: 30 (IST)
- ISO 3166 code: IN-BR

LakhnichakAulai is a village in Vaishali district, Bihar, India.

== Geography ==
Ahmadpur LakhnichakAulai is located at village 25°41′35.2″N 85°19′21.6″E

== Village profile ==
- State: Bihar
- District: Vaishali district
- Sub-district: Hajipur

== Area details ==
- Area of village (in hectares): 52
- Number of households: 241

== population ==
- Total population: 1,646
- Total male population: 874
- Total female population: 772
- Scheduled castes population (total): 398
- Scheduled castes male: 203
- Scheduled castes female: 195

== Education facilities ==
- Number of primary schools: 1
- Middle school available with in range: within 5 km
- College available within range: within 5 km

== Medical facilities ==
- Allopathic hospitals Shreya Health Care, Suresh Prasad Chowk, Bidupur RS Hajipur vaishali, available with in range: Between 1 km and 10 km
- Primary health centre available within range: within 5 km
- Maternity and child welfare centre available with in range: more than 10 km

== Post, telegraph and telephone facilities ==
- Post, telegraph and phone facilities: available
- Post office available: within 5 km
- Telephone connections available: within 5 km

== Transportation ==
- Bus services available within range: more than 10 km
- Railway service available within range: within 5 km
- Navigable water way available within range: more than 10 km

== Banking facilities ==
- Commercial bank available within range: within 5 km
- Co-operative bank Available within range: more than 10 km

== Recreational and cultural facilities ==
- Cinema and video-hall available with in range: more than 10 km
- Sports club available range: more than 10 km
- Stadium /auditorium available with in range: more than 10 km

== Approach to villages ==
- Nearest town: HajipurNearest station Akshywat Nagar Bidupur Nearest Chowk:Suresh prasad Chowk near akshywat stadium Bidupur stadium stadium Bidupur
- Distance from the nearest town: 15 km

== Power supply ==
- Power supply facilities: available
- Electricity for domestic use: 01
- Electricity of agricultural use: 01

== Newspapers and magazines ==
- Newspaper and magazine facilities: available
- Newspaper: available
- Magazine: available

== Land use in hectares ==
- Total irrigated area: 0.00
- Non-irrigated area: 29.10
- Culturable waste (including gauchar and groves): 16.40
- Area not available for cultivation: 6.34
