= Bhalui =

- Community Development Block
- Location in Bihar, India
- Coordinates: 25.712473°N 85.352178°E
- Country: India
- State: Bihar
- District: vaishali
- District Sub-division: Mahua
- Anchal: Bhalui
- Vidhan Sabha constituency: Raja pakar

Population (2001)
  - Total: 120,221

Languages
  - Official: Hindi
- Time zone: UTC+5:30 (IST)
- Postal code: 844124
- ISO 3166 code: IN-BR

Bhalui is a village (Rajapakar Vidhan Sabha constituency) in Vaishali district, Bihar, India. According to the census website, all blocks in Bihar are named as C.D.Block (community development blocks). It has a population of 120,221 according to 2001 census. Hindi is the official language mainly used in Bhalui.

== Block office ==
Bhalui Rajapakar Vaishali.

== Schools and College ==
Prathmik Vidyalya Bhalui and Sant Kabir College Bhalui (SKC).

== Major Roads ==
NH-103 SH-49
