= Dayalpur, Vaishali =

Dayalpur
- Village
- Location in Bihar, India Dayalpur (India)
- Coordinates: 25°42′54″N 85°18′54″E
- Country: India
- State: Bihar
- District: Vaishali

Languages
  - Official: Bajjika, Hindi
- Time zone: UTC+5:30 (IST)
- Telephone code: 06224 postal_code = 844502
- ISO 3166 code: IN-BR

Dayalpur is a village in Hajipur, Vaishali, in the state of Bihar. It has existed since around 1500 AD.

== Demographics ==
The population is approximately 9,865 (98% Hindu and 2% Muslim). The literacy rate is 53.03% with a female rate of 38.94% and a male rate of 66.51%.

== Climate ==
The region is green with plants and trees growing in a semi-tropical monsoon climate. The months of May–June are hot and December–January are cold.
