= Bhagwanpur, Vaishali =

Bhagwanpur
- Town
- Location in Vaishali, India Bhagwanpur (India)
- Coordinates: 25.858°N 85.296°E
- Country: India
- State: Bihar
- District: Vaishali
- CDB: Bhagwanpur

Population (2011)
  - Total: 2,508
- Time zone: UTC+05:30 (IST)
- PIN: 844114
- Vehicle registration: BR
- Literacy: 83.56% (2011)
- Website: vaishali.nic.in

Bhagwanpur is a town in the Bhagwanpur block of Vaishali district in Bihar, India.

== Demographics ==
As of the 2023 Census of India, Bhagwanpur had a population of 274,246. Males constituted 53% of the population and females 47%. Bhagwanpur had an average literacy rate of 83.56%, higher than the national average of 59.5%; with male literacy at 87.41% and female literacy of 79.22%. There were a total of 516 households.

== Schools ==
There is a secondary school, Shri Lakshmi Narayan Saraswati Vidya Mandir, and three colleges, Vishun Roy College, Lakshmi Narayan College, St Lawrence school and Patna Sahib College of Engineering & Technology, Anglo Eastern International standard School, located in Bhagwanpur.

=== Vishun Roy College, Bhagwanpur ===
Vishun Roy College VRC (abbreviated VR College, also known as Bishun Rai College) Owned by an Powerful Politician of Bihar Dr J Yadav @ Judge Sahab. VRC is an Educational institute in Bihar state of India. It is located in Kiratpur Raja Ram of Vaishali district. Which was established in year 1984 by an Indian educationist and philanthropist Shri Rajdeo Roy also the Chairman of Yadav Mahasabha Bihar. It is the oldest institution of the higher education in the district of Vaishali.

=== Shri Lakshmi Narayan Saraswati Vidya Mandir ===
Shri Lakshmi Narayan Saraswati Vidya Mandir is an independent, co-educational school that is affiliated to the Central Board of Secondary Education. It was established in 1998. A total of 543 students, spread across 9 classes, attend the school. There are 21 trained teaching staff, including a librarian, vice principal, and physical education teacher, present at the school.

=== Lakshmi Narayan College ===
Lakshmi Narayan College is a NAAC-ranked "B" grade school. It was established in 1975. Currently, a team of 8 teaching and 21 non-teaching staff support over 2500 men and women studying in a range of subjects, including political science, physics, botany, and education.

== Transportation ==
NH-77 passes through the town. There is also a railroad station.

=== Railroad station ===
A railway station is located in the middle of Bhagwanpur. Bhagwanpur railway station has two platforms, with a footbridge over the railroad tracks connecting them together. Many express trains stop at the station.
