= Ekara =

- Village
- Country: India
- State: Bihar
- District: Vaishali
- Gram Panchayat: Thathan Buzurg
- Block: Hajipur

Area
  - Total: 38 km^{2} (15 sq mi)
- Elevation: 55 m (180 ft)

Population
  - Total: 878
  - Density: 23/km^{2} (60/sq mi)

Languages
  - Official: Hindi, Maithili [bajjika]
- Time zone: UTC+5:30 (IST)
- Postal code: 844125
- Area code: 844125
- ISO 3166 code: IN-BR

Ekara is a small village in Hajipur Tehsil/Block in Vaishali District in Indian state of Bihar, India. It comes under Ekara Panchayat. It belongs to Tirhut Division. It is located 9 km towards North from District headquarters Hajipur. As per 2009 stats, Thathan Buzurg is the gram panchayat of Ekara village. It is about 23 km from the state capital Patna. Sonpur, Hajipur, Lalganj are the nearby cities to Ekara.

== Geography ==
The total geographical area of Ekara village is 38 hectares. Ekara has a total population of 878 peoples. There are about 140 houses in Ekara village. Hajipur is the nearest town to Ekara which is approximately 9 km away.

== Demography ==
Ekara local Language is Maithili. According to Census 2011 information the location code or village code of Ekara village is 235643. Ekara village total population is 878 and number of houses are 140. Female Population is 46.8%. village total literacy rate is 62.2% and the female literacy rate is 24.5%. Scheduled Tribes population is 0.0% and Scheduled Caste population is 25.9%.

== Transportation and Connectivity ==
=== Rail ===
Sarai railway station, Chakmakrand railways station are the very nearby railway stations to Ekara. Sonpur junction railway station (near to Hajipur), Hajipur junction railway station reachable from nearby towns. The Patna junction railway station is major railway station 22 km near to Ekara.

=== Road ===
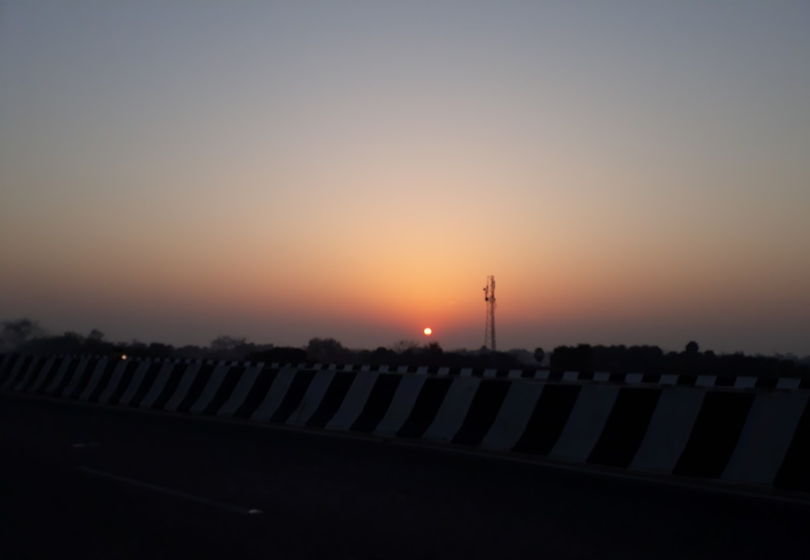
Ekara National Highway no. 22

Ekara has good road communications due to development efforts by the government. Hajipur are the nearby by towns to Ekara having road connectivity to Ekara. At the village nearest city is Hajipur approximately 9 km away.

== Infrastructure ==
The Ekara village have a comprehensive regular electricity supply that efforts of local governing bodies have been introduced to provide power for street lighting.

== Images ==
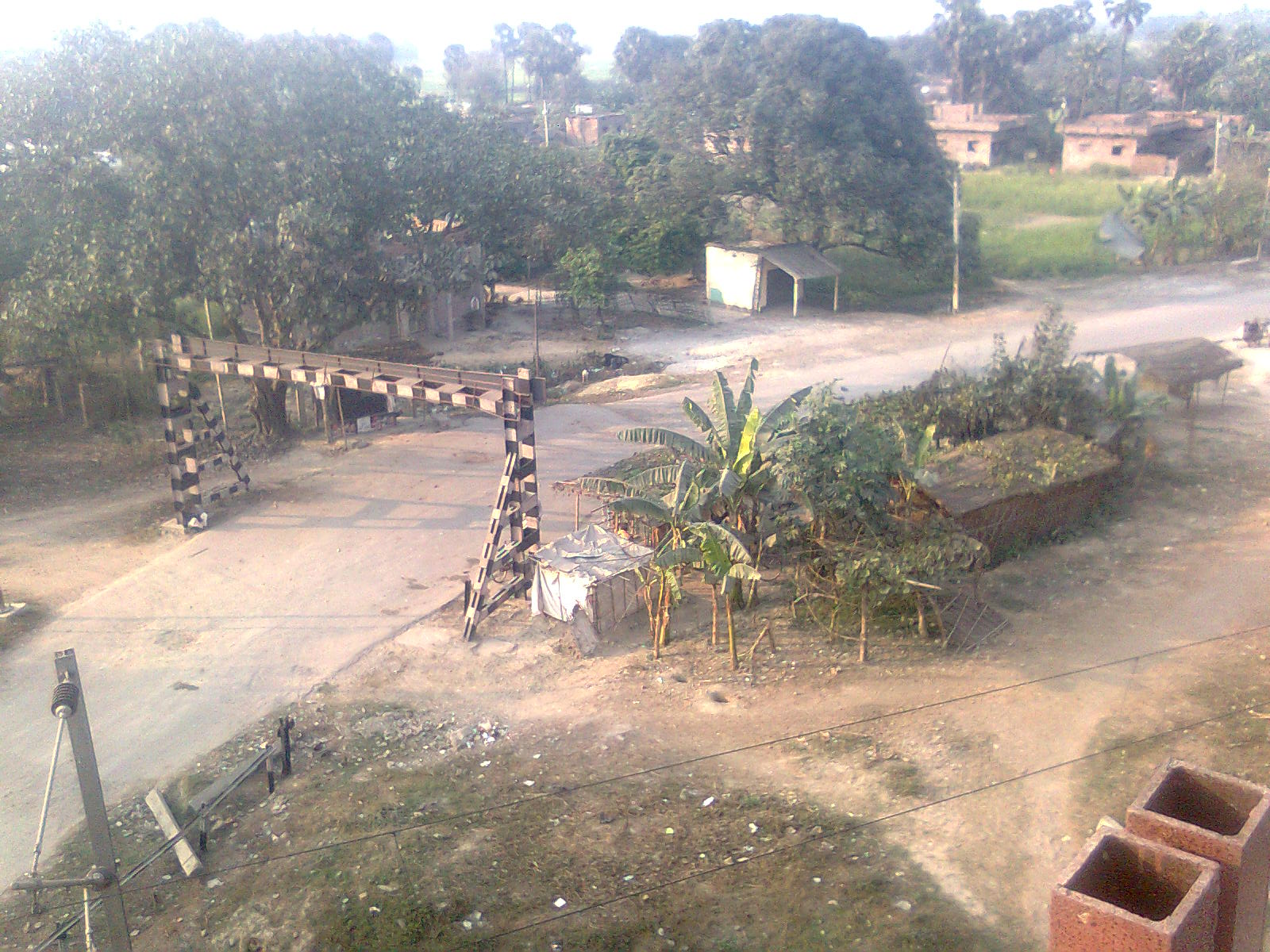
View Ekara village

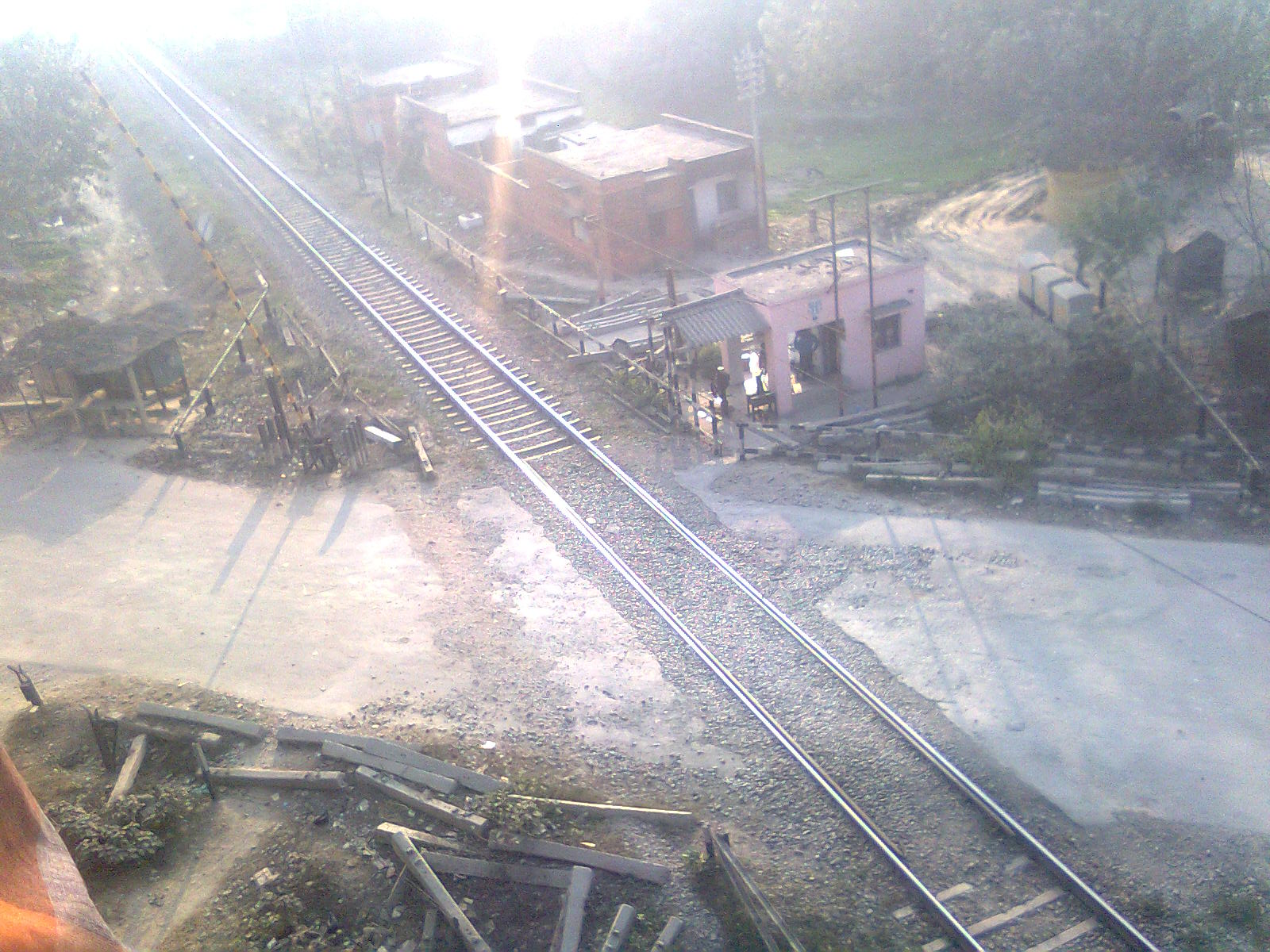
Ekara Railway Crossing

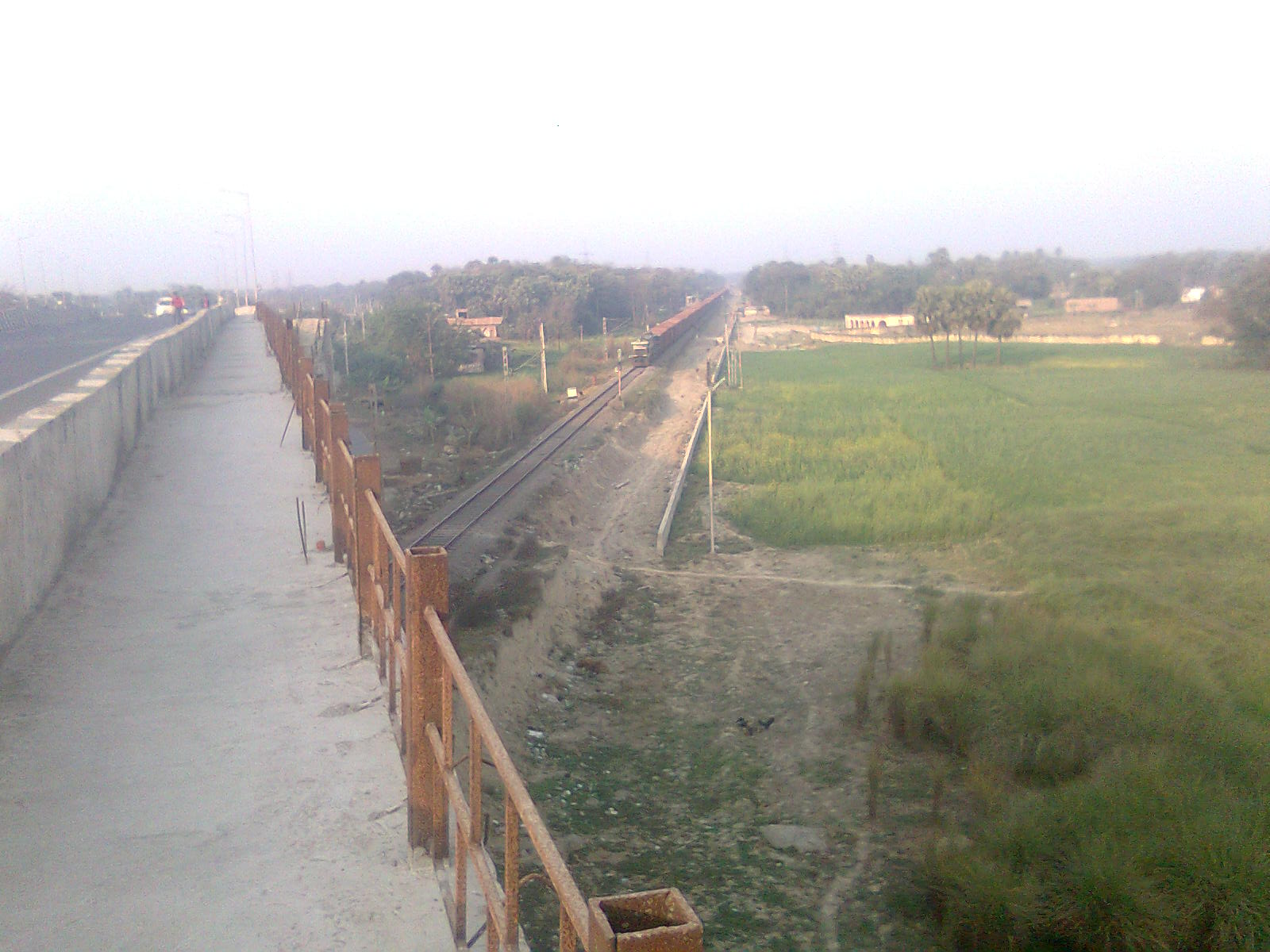
Ekara national highway & farming areas
