= Bhagwanpura =

Bhagwanpura may refer to:

- Bhagwanpura, Haryana, in India
- Bhagwanpura (Ludhiana East), Punjab, India
- Bhagwanpura, Madhya Pradesh, in India
- Bhagwanpura (Vidhan Sabha constituency), Madhya Pradesh, India

== See also ==
- Bhagwanpur (disambiguation)
