= Kancha =

Kancha may refer to:

- Kancha, Bihar, a village in India
- Kancha language, or Kunja, a Papuan language of New Guinea
- Kancha Ilaiah (born 1952), Indian political theorist
- Kancha Cheena, primary antagonist in the 1990 Indian film Agneepath and its 2012 remake, portrayed by Danny Denzongpa and Sanjay Dutt respectively
- Inca kancha, Inca walled enclosure composed of buildings that face onto a courtyard

== See also ==
- Canchacanchajasa, a mountain in the Andes of Peru
