= Kurhani railway station =

Railway station in Bihar

General information
- Location: National Highway 22, Kurhani, Muzaffarpur district, Bihar; India
- Coordinates: 25.979631°N 85.339288°E
- Elevation: 56 metres (184 ft)
- System: Indian Railway Station
- Owner: Indian Railways
- Line: Muzaffarpur–Hajipur section
- Platforms: 3
- Tracks: 5

Construction
- Structure type: Standard (on ground station)
- Parking: No
- Cycle facilities: No

Other information
- Status: Functioning
- Station code: KHI
- Zone(s): East Central Railway
- Division(s): Sonpur railway division

History
- Opened: 2009; 17 years ago

Services
| Preceding station | Indian Railways | Following station |
|---|---|---|
| Turki towards ? | East Central Railway zone Muzaffarpur–Hajipur section | Goraul towards ? |
Location

Kurhani railway station (station code: KHI), is a halt railway station on the Muzaffarpur–Hajipur section in East Central Railway under Sonpur railway division of Indian Railways. The railway station is situated beside National Highway 22 at Kurhani in Muzaffarpur district of the Indian state of Bihar.
