= Muzaffarpur–Hajipur section =

Indian railway line

Overview
- Status: Operational
- Owner: Indian Railways
- Locale: Bihar
- Termini: Muzaffarpur; Hajipur
- Stations: 11

Service
- Type: Passenger and Freight Train Line
- Services: Barauni–Gorakhpur line
- Operator(s): Indian Railways, East Central Railway
- Depot(s): Hajipur and Narayanpur Anant station in Muzaffarpur
- Rolling stock: Diesel Locos: WDM-2, WDM-3A, WDS-5, WDP 4 and WDG 4

History
- Opened: 1886

Technical
- Line length: 53.83 km (33.4 mi)
- Track length: 59 km (36.7 mi)
- Number of tracks: 2 (double electrified)
- Track gauge: 5 ft 6 in (1,676 mm) broad gauge
- Electrification: 25 kV 50 Hz AC OHLE (between 2011 and December 2014): (started 24 December 2014)
- Operating speed: up to 100 km/h (62 mph)
- Highest elevation: 57 m (187 ft)

The Muzaffarpur–Hajipur section is an electrified double railway line connecting Muzaffarpur to Hajipur in the Indian state of Bihar. The 53.83 km (33 mi) line passes through the plains of North Bihar and the Gangetic Plain in Bihar.

== Electrification ==
Former Railway Minister Laloo Prasad Yadav announced the electrification of Barauni–Samastipur–Muzaffarpur–Hajipur line and Muzaffarpur–Gorakhpur line (via Hajipur, Raxaul and Sitamarhi) in the Rail Budget 2008. The electrification began in 2011 and was completed in 2014.

== Stations ==
There are 9 stations between Muzaffarpur Junction and Hajipur Junction.

Station code	Station name	Distance (km)
MFP	Muzaffarpur Junction	0
RD	Ram Dayalu Nagar	5.04
TUR	Turki	13.75
KHI	Kurhani	20.09
GRL	Ghoraul	25.88
BNPT	Benipatti Pirapur	27.81
BNR	Bhagwanpur	34.17
BTHL	Bithauli	38.83
SAI	Sarai	43.22
GWH	Ghoswar	49.27
HJP	Hajipur Junction	53.83

== Speed limit ==
The Barauni–Samastipur–Muzaffarpur–Hajipur line is not an A-Class line of Indian Railways. So maximum speed is restricted to 130 km/h, which was electrified in December 2014 and the doubling work was in progress which is completed between Muzaffarpur Junction to Bhagwanpur railway station .

== Sidings and workshops ==
- Kanti Thermal Power Station, Muzaffarpur
- Bharat Wagon Engineering Limited, Muzaffarpur
- Major Freight Terminal at Narayanpur Anant
- Bharat Petroleum Siding, Narayanpur Anant
- FCI Siding at Narayanpur Anant
- PSC Sleeper Siding at Sarai
- DEMU maintenance depot at Sonepur

== See also ==
- Barauni–Gorakhpur, Raxaul and Jainagar lines
- Samastipur–Muzaffarpur section
- Barauni–Samastipur section
- Muzaffarpur Junction
- Hajipur Junction
- East Central Railway zone
