= Mahnar Bazar =

Mahnar Bazar Maharar
- Town
- Location in Bihar, India
- Coordinates: 25.60383°N 85.49231°E
- Country: India
- State: Bihar
- District: Vaishali

Population (2018)
  - Total: 78,679

Languages
  - Official: Bajjika, Hindi
- Time zone: UTC+5:30 (IST)
- Postal code: 844506
- Lok Sabha constituency: Hajipur
- Vidhan Sabha constituency: Mahnar
- Website: vaishali.bih.nic.in

Mahnar Bazar is a municipality, block and sub-division in Vaishali district of Bihar state in India. It is also the main market to all nearby ward areas and villages. Mahnar comes under Hajipur Lok Sabha constituency. It is a Nagarpalika divided into many wards. It has its own police station and land registration office. The area has well-equipped government hospital and animal hospital.

== Demographics ==
As of 2001 India census, Mahnar Bazar had a population of 37,354. Males constitute 52% of the population and females 48%. Mahnar Bazar has an average literacy rate of 43%, lower than the national average of 59.5%: male literacy is 52%, and female literacy is 33%. In Mahnar Bazar, 20% of the population is under 6 years of age.
