= Lal Keshwar Shiv Temple =

Hindu temple in Hajipur, India

Lal Keshwar Shiv Mandir
- Lord Shiva Temple
- Location in Bihar

Religion
- Affiliation: Hinduism
- District: Vaishali
- Deity: Lord Shiva

Location
- Location: Bagmusa, Hajipur
- State: Bihar
- Country: India
- Coordinates: 25°42′N 85°12′E

Architecture
- Type: Indian
- Completed: Aug 2015

The Lal Keshwar Shiv Mandir is a Hindu Temple in the city of Hajipur in Bihar, India. Dedicated to Lord Shiva, it is located at Bagmusa (Hajipur), Vaishali. As per local folklore, it is said to have been in existence since ancient times and Lord Shiva is believed to be in the form of Lingam. Apart from anthropomorphic images of Shiva, the worship of Shiva in the form of a lingam, or linga, is also important. The worship of the Shiva-Linga originated from the famous hymn in the Atharva-Veda Samhitâ sung in praise of the Yupa-Stambha, the sacrificial post.
