= Kiratpur Raja Ram =

Kiratpur Raja Ram Kiratpur Rajaram
- village
- Location within Bihar Location within India
- Coordinates: 25.856°N 85.285°E
- Country: India
- State: Bihar
- District: Vaishali
- Block: Bhagwanpur

Area
  - Total: 3.71 km^{2} (1.43 sq mi)
- Elevation: 55 m (180 ft)

Population (2011)
  - Total: 10,891
  - Density: 2,940/km^{2} (7,600/sq mi)
- Time zone: UTC+5:30 (IST)
- Postal Index Number: 844114
- STD code: 06224

Kiratpur Raja Ram is a village in Vaishali district of Bihar, India. It is located in the Bhagwanpur block.

According to the 2011 Census of India, the village has 2020 households with a total population of 10,891. This includes 5717 males and 5174 females. The effective literacy rate (literacy rate excluding children aged 6 years and below) is 58.41%.

The Vishun Roy College is located in Kiratpur Rajaram. Owned by an Indian Philanthropist and powerful politician Dr. J Yadav at Judge Sahab, the college was once known for producing state-level exam toppers. However, in 2016, it was de-recognized by the Bihar School Examination Board (BSEB) for irregularities.
