= Vishun Roy College =

College in Vaishali Bihar, India

Vishun Roy College VRC
- Vishun Roy College VRC Vaishali Bihar
- Other name: V R College
- Motto: Empowering Minds Inspiring Future
- Type: Private (Co-Edu)
- Established: 1984
- Founder: Shri Rajdeo Roy
- Parent institution: Shrimati Lalmuni Devi Trust
- Affiliations: Bihar School Examination Board
- Chairman: Shri Rajdeo Roy
- Principal: Prof. Subhadra Kumari
- Academic staff: 370
- Administrative staff: 60
- Students: 2,400
- Location: Kiratpur Rajaram Bhagwanpur Vaishali, Bihar, 844114, India
- Campus: 7 Acre
- Language: Hindi & English
- Colors: White Blue
- Website: www.vrcollege.ac.in
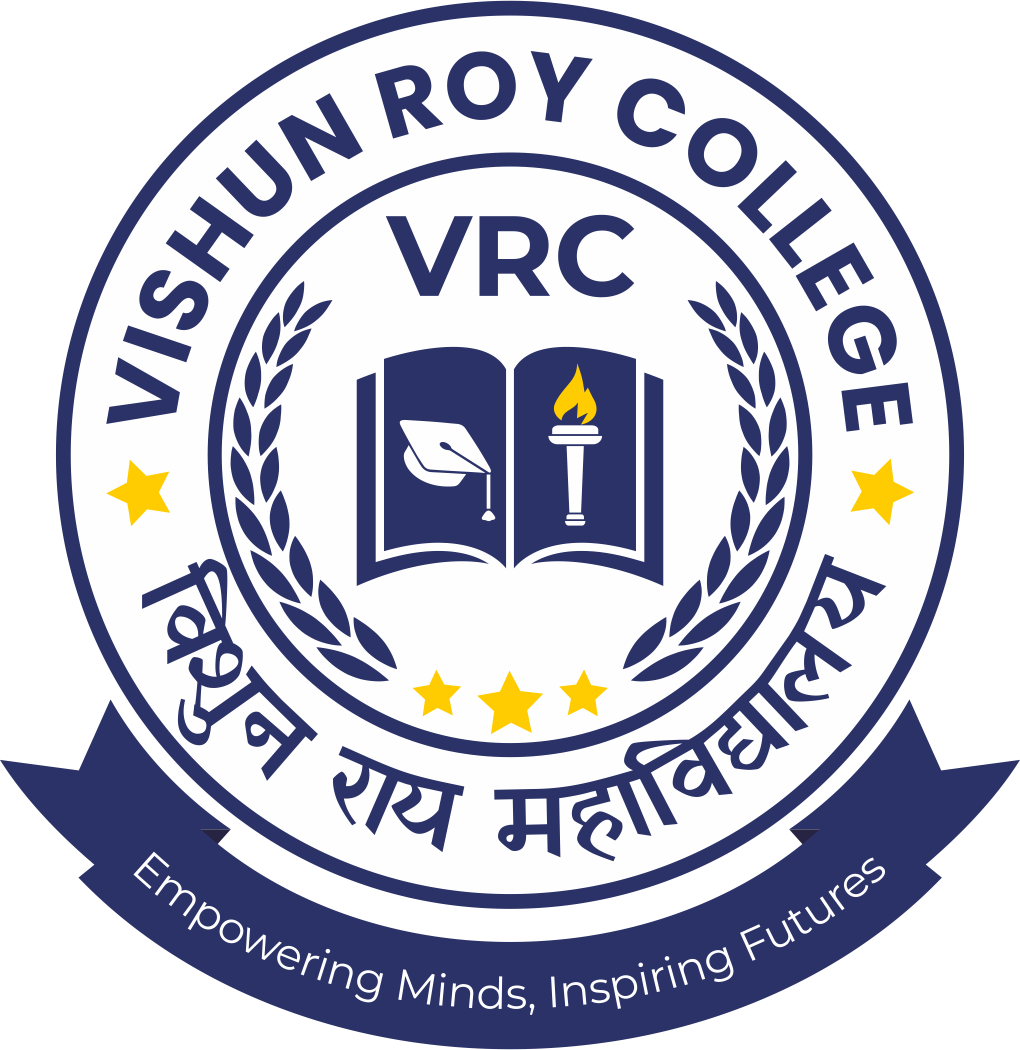

Vishun Roy College VRC (abbreviated VR College, also known as Bishun Rai College) is an Educational institute in Bihar state of India. It is located in Kiratpur Raja Ram of Vaishali district. Which was established in year 1984 by an Indian educationist and philanthropist Shri Rajdeo Roy also the Chairman of Yadav Mahasabha Bihar. It is the oldest institution of the higher education in the district of Vaishali.

== Revival Of Affiliation ==
Vishun Roy College gets its affiliation revived by the order of hon'ble High Court when the chairman shri Rajdeo ray fills a petition mentioning that they have removed the Former Principal Amit Kumar ails Baccha Ray from all the posts of College Baccha Ray is not associated with Vishun Roy college by any way with then high court made judgement directing the Bihar school examination board to constitute new inspection team and do the inspection of college and if it fulfils all the requirements then revive the affiliation of Vishun Roy College. In the month of October 2023 Vishun Roy College was given affiliation with code 33408 with appointment Principal Prof Nand Kishor Ray UR Trust Shrimati Lalmuni Devi Trust, Chief Trustee Dr J Kumar Alis Judge Sahab. College will start taking admission from new session 2024-26 for intermediate with stream Science, Arts, Commerce

== Departments and Courses ==
Science

- Physics
- Chemistry
- Biology
- Mathematic

Arts

- Hindi
- English
- Urdu
- Sanskrit
- Economics
- History
- Philosophy
- Political Science
- Psychology

Commerce

- I.Com

== Examination success ==
In 2014, seven out of the Bihar's top 10 were from this college. Because of its "stellar record," the college attracted students from far-off districts.

Since 2014, the college has faced allegations of irregularities. Lalkeshwar Prasad Singh, the chairman of the Bihar School Examination Board (BSEB) was suspected of favouring the college.

When allegations of irregularities surfaced, he formed a judicial committee for investigation, but did not inform the state's education department.

== 2016 Temporarily de-recognition ==
Vishun Roy College VRC was Temporarily Derecognized by BSEB Patna for not fulfilling the standards and facilities required by the norms of BSEB; it was not from the reason that it had given too many fake toppers. On 28 May 2016, the BSEB publicly declared the intermediate results, however it released its official merit list for 10 May 2016 itself but due to some issues, it made the results public to a later date. VR College students emerged as toppers in both arts and science streams in Class XII exams. Student Ruby Rai topped arts stream with 89% marks, while student Saurabh Shresth topped science stream with 97% marks. Rahul Kumar, another science student of VR College, obtained the third highest marks in the state. Around 1,323,000 students had appeared for the exams: no other student had scored more than 90% marks.

When interviewed by the Aaj Tak TV channel, Ruby Rai and Saurabh Shresth were unable to answer basic questions. The science topper Saurabh Shresth could not describe the link between water and H_{2}O (the chemical formula for water). He also wrongly named aluminium as the most reactive element.

After the video of their interviews became popular, the BSEB asked them and other toppers to appear before a team of experts for a test. Saurabh Shresth and Rahul Kumar of VR College failed in this test. Ruby Rai did not appear for the test, citing poor health. The Board subsequently de-recognized VR College temporarily and 'it was told by the board that the college will be get affiliation after court makes Judgement and approve them to take affiliation.', and ordered an inquiry into the irregularities.

On 8 June 2016, the BSEB chairman Lalkeshwar Prasad Singh resigned after being served a show-cause notice by the Bihar state's education department. On 25 June, Ruby Rai appeared before BSEB team for re-evaluation, and failed to answer a single question correctly. She was subsequently arrested.
