= Patedhi Belsar =

Community development block in Vaishali district, Bihar, India

Patedhi Belsar पटेढ़ी बेलसर
- Community Development Block
- Location in Bihar, India
- Coordinates: 25°58′22″N 85°13′26″E
- Country: India
- State: Bihar
- District: vaishali
- District Sub-division: Hajipur
- Anchal: Patedhi belsar
- Vidhan Sabha constituency: Vaishali

Population (2001)
  - Total: 74,461

Languages
  - Official: Hindi
- Time zone: UTC+5:30 (IST)
- ISO 3166 code: IN-BR

Patedhi Belsar ( in Hindi : पटेढ़ी बेलसर ) is a region in the Vaishali District and Bihar State. According to census website, the nomenclature of all regions in the Bihar State is done via C.D. Blocks. ( Community Development Blocks).

== Block office ==
- Number of Panchayat: 9
- Number of Vil

== Panchayat ==
- Belsar
- Sorhattha
- Sain
- Nagwan
- Misroliya Afjalpur
- Manora
- Chakgulamuddin
- Jaran Rampur
- Karneji

== Demographics ==
The population is 74,461, including 36423 females and 38038 males for a sex ratio of 958. 17,464 are members of Scheduled Castes. Minorities make up 6940.

== Public distribution system ==
Many residents receive public benefits:

- Number of HHS : 12392
- BPL Card Holders : 11568
- Antodaya Card Holders : 2232
- Annapurna Card Holders : 301
- APL : 9167
- Number of Fair Price Shops: 40

== Education ==
The literacy rate 47.9% (2001 ist.) The male literacy rate is 60.9% and the female literacy rate 34.5%.

=== Schools ===
The area supports 43 primary schools (2009 est.) and 37 upper primary schools.
