= Thathan Buzurg =

- Village
- Location in bihar, India Thathan Buzurg (India)
- Coordinates: 25°44′58.5″N 85°14′33.0″E
- Country: India
- State: Bihar
- District: Vaishali
- Assembly Constituency: Hajipur

Languages
  - Official: Hindi
- Time zone: UTC+5:30 (IST)
- Postal code: 844125
- ISO 3166 code: IN-BR

Thathan Buzurg is a village located in the Hajipur block of Vaishali district, Bihar, India. The Hajipur is the closest town and is 6 km from the village.

The village is governed by a gram panchayat which also includes other villages.

s.n	villages
1	Rasulpur Bhoj Urf Adharpur
2	Bedaulia
3	Ghoswar
4	Fatehpur Ekara Urf Moghlani
5	Thathan Buzurg
6	Kazipur Thathan
7	Fatehpur Chiraimar
8	Ekara
9	Kutubpur Ekara
10	Chak Kutubpur Matwalia
