= Bhagwanpura (Ludhiana East) =

- Village
- Location in Punjab, India Bhagwanpura (India)
- Coordinates: 30.8331541°N 76.1870089°E
- Country: India
- State: Punjab
- District: Ludhiana

Government
  - Type: Panchayati raj (India)
  - Body: Gram panchayat

Languages
  - Official: Punjabi
  - Other spoken: Hindi
- Time zone: UTC+5:30 (IST)
- Telephone code: 0161
- ISO 3166 code: IN-PB
- Vehicle registration: PB-91
- Website: ludhiana.nic.in

Bhagwanpura is a village located in the Ludhiana East tehsil, of Ludhiana district, Punjab.

== Administration ==
The village is administrated by a Sarpanch who is an elected representative of village as per constitution of India and Panchayati raj (India).

Particulars	Total	Male	Female
Total No. of Houses	58		
Population	360	198	162

== Child Sex Ratio details ==
The village population of children with an age group from 0-6 is 27 which makes up 7.50% of total population of village. Average Sex Ratio is 818 per 1000 males which is lower than the state average of 895. The child Sex Ratio as per census is 286, lower than average of 846 in the state of Punjab.

== Cast ==
The village constitutes 21.11% of Schedule Caste and the village doesn't have any Schedule Tribe population.
