= Vaishali (community development block) =

Community development block in Vaishali district, Bihar, India

Vaishali वैशाली
- Community Development Block
- Location in Bihar, India
- Coordinates: 25.989473°N 85.130298°E
- Country: India
- State: Bihar
- District: vaishali
- District Sub-division: Hajipur
- Anchal: Vaishali
- Vidhan Sabha constituency: Vaishali

Government
  - Type: Community development block

Population (2001)
  - Total: 146,364

Languages
  - Official: Hindi
- Time zone: UTC+5:30 (IST)
- ISO 3166 code: IN-BR

Vaishali is a community development block in Vaishali district of Bihar, India. It is also called Vaishali C. D. Block, as per the census nomenclature.

== Major roads ==
SH-74

== Villages ==
- Number of Panchayat : 16
- Number of Villages : 112

== Population and communities ==
- Male Population : 75140 (2009 ist.)
- Female Population : 71224
- Total Population : 146364
- SC Total Population : 26256
- ST Total Population : 461
- Minority Total Population : 19830
- Population Density : 1154
- Sex Ratio : 948

== Public distribution system ==
- Nos of HHs : 22629
- BPL Card Holders : 21710
- Antodaya Card Holders : 4190
- Annapurna Card Holders : 394
- APL : 18932
- Nos of Fair Price Shops: 72

== Education ==
- Literacy rate : 49.4% (2001 ist.)
- Male literacy rate : 61.7%
- Female literacy rate : 36.3%

=== School ===
- Primary School : 78 (2009 ist.)
- Upper Primary School : 61

== Banking ==
- Number of banks : 5
