= Sahdei Buzurg =

Community development block in Vaishali district, Bihar, India

- Community Development Block
- Location in Bihar, India
- Coordinates: 25.669895°N 85.453848°E
- Country: India
- State: Bihar
- District: Vaishali
- District Sub-division: Mahnar
- Anchal: Sahdei Buzurg

Population (2001)
  - Total: 99,459

Languages
  - Official: Hindi
- Time zone: UTC+5:30 (IST)
- ISO 3166 code: IN-BR

Sahdei Buzurg is a block in Vaishali district of Bihar.

== Villages ==
- Number of Panchayat : 11
- Number of Villages : 47

== Population and communities ==
- Male Population : 51928 (2009 ist.)
- Female Population : 47532
- Total Population : 99459
- SC Total Population : 20090
- ST Total Population : 78
- Minority Total Population : 9231
- Population Density : 1133
- Sex Ratio : 916

== Education ==
- literacy rate : 52.5% (2001 ist.)
- male literacy rate : 66.2%
- Female literacy rate :15

ĢĢĢĢĢı.5 %

=== School ===
- Primary School : 62 (2009 ist.)
- Upper Primary School : 50
