= Bhagwanpur, Kapurthala =

Bhagwanpur
- Village
- Location in Punjab, India Bhagwanpur (India)
- Coordinates: 31.362258°N 75.338303°E
- Country: India
- State: Punjab
- District: Kapurthala

Government
  - Type: Panchayati raj (India)
  - Body: Gram panchayat

Population (2011)
  - Total: 855
- Sex ratio 432/423♂/♀

Languages
  - Official: Punjabi
  - Other spoken: Hindi
- Time zone: UTC+5:30 (IST)
- PIN: 144601
- Telephone code: 01822
- ISO 3166 code: IN-PB
- Vehicle registration: PB-09
- Website: kapurthala.gov.in

Bhagwanpur is a village in Kapurthala district of Punjab State, India. It is located 4 kilometres (2.5 mi) from Kapurthala, which is both district and sub-district headquarters of Bhagwanpur. The village is administrated by a Sarpanch who is an elected representative of village as per the constitution of India and Panchayati raj (India).

== Demography ==
As per Population Census 2011, the Bhagwanpur village has population of 855 of which 432 are males while 423 are females. The village is administrated by Sarpanch an elected representative of the village. Literacy rate of Bhagwanpur is 71.77%, lower than state average of 75.84% of Punjab. The population of children under the age of 6 years is 97 which is 11.35% of total population of Bhagwanpur and child sex ratio is approximately 1021 higher than Punjab average of 846.

As per census 2011, 283 people were engaged in work activities out of the total population of Bhagwanpur which includes 260 males and 23 females. According to census survey report 2011, 91.87% workers describe their work as main work and 8.13% workers are involved in Marginal activity providing livelihood for less than 6 months.

== Caste ==
The village has schedule caste (SC) constitutes 40.58% of total population of the village and it doesn't have any Schedule Tribe (ST) population.

== Population data ==
Particulars	Total	Male	Female
Total No. of Houses	140		
Population	855	432	423
Child (0–6)	97	48	49
Schedule Caste	347	171	176
Schedule Tribe	0	0	0
Literacy	71.77 %	78.13%	65.24 %
Total Workers	283	260	23
Main Worker	260	0	0
Marginal Worker	23	19	4

== Air travel connectivity ==
The closest airport to the village is Sri Guru Ram Dass Jee International Airport.
