= Bhagwanpur, Uttar Pradesh =

Bhagwanpur Bujurg
- Village
- Nickname: Bhagwanpur
- Location in Uttar Pradesh, India Bhagwanpur Bujurg (India)
- Coordinates: 26.75°N 83.74°E
- Country: India
- State: Uttar Pradesh
- List of districts of India: Kushinagar

Area
  - Total: 25 km^{2} (9.7 sq mi)
- Elevation: 75 m (246 ft)

Population (2011)
  - Total: 12,805
  - Density: 510/km^{2} (1,300/sq mi)

Languages
  - Official: Hindi
- Time zone: UTC+5:30 (IST)
- Postal code: 274203
- Vehicle registration: UP 57
- Website: kushinagar.nic.in

Bhagwanpur Bujurg is a village in Kushinagar district of Uttar Pradesh. It is situated 28 km from Gorakhpur in the east. It is a major village of Kushinagar district situated on NH −28. The nearest railway station is 28 km from Gorakhpur railways station. The nearest airport is 25 km From Gorakhpur and 36 km from Kushinagar International Airport. Google Map Link

Gorakhpur Link expressway through this village.

It provide connectivity to Purvanchal expressway.
