= Akshaywat Rai Nagar railway station =

Railway station in Vaishali, Bihar, India

Akshaywat Rai Nagar station

General information
- Location: Bidupur, Near, Suresh Prasad Chowk, Akshywat Rai stadium Road Vaishali, Bihar; India
- Coordinates: 25°50′9″N 85°39′3″E
- Elevation: 53 metres (174 ft)
- System: Indian Railways station
- Owner: Indian Railways
- Line: Barauni–Gorakhpur, Raxaul and Jainagar lines
- Platforms: 3
- Tracks: 4

Construction
- Structure type: Standard (on-ground station)
- Parking: No

Other information
- Status: Functioning
- Station code: AYRN
- Zone(s): East Central Railway
- Division(s): Sonpur

History
- Former names: East Indian Railway

Passengers
- 5000
Location

Akshaywat Rai Nagar Station, station code (AYRN), is a railway station in the Sonpur railway division of East Central Railway. Akshaywat Rai Nagar Station is located in bidupur block of Vaishali district in the Indian state of Bihar.
