= Desari =

Community development block in Vaishali district, Bihar, India

- Community Development Block DESARI
- Location in Bihar, India
- Coordinates: 25.66922°N 85.408037°E
- Country: India
- State: Bihar
- Region: Mithila
- District: Vaishali

Population (2012)
  - Total: 177,741

Languages
  - Official: Bajjika, Maithili, Hindi
- Time zone: UTC+5:30 (IST)
- PIN: 844504
- Lok Sabha constituency: Hajipur
- Vidhan Sabha constituency: Rajapakar

Desari is a community development block in Vaishali district in the Indian state of Bihar. The main Post office is Desari Desari is one of the 16 blocks of Vaishali and there are 39 villages in the block.

Desari is about 40 km from Patna and 21 km from Hajipur.

== Geography ==
=== Villages in Desari ===
The Following is a list of all thirty nine villages

- Desari
- Babhangawan
- Bishunpur Chand
- Bishunpur Ijra
- Chakmahmad
- Chandpura Nankar
- Chandpura Chauck Bhikhanpura
- Chandpur Bazar
- Chak Arab
- Fatikwara
- Dharamdaspur
- Dharampur Ram Rae
- Ganiari
- Ghazipur Garahi
- Jafrabad
- Jaga Chandpura
- Jahangirpur Sham
- Kharkpur Urf Saifabad
- Khoksa Buzurg
- Khairi rampur
- Kuatpur
- Lakhanpur Tal
- Lakhanpura
- Madhaul Harpur Chand
- Madhaul Khurd
- Madhopur Gajpati
- Mamrezpur
- Mohammadpur BuzurgUrfLakhanpur
- Panapur Raghunath
- Azampur
- Rampur Kichni
- Rampur Madhaul
- Rasulpur Habib
- Rasulpur Jilani
- Sauta
- Tayabpur
- Tayabpur Kharij Jama
- Uphraul

== Education ==
- Middle school Fatikwara
- BPS College
- SPS college
- RR College
- Desari High School
- Chakmahmad Middle School
- High School Bhatauliya, Chandpura Nankhar
- St Michael School, Desari
- Boys Middle School, Desari
- Girls Middle School, Desari
- The IAS Ville, Desari Lakhanpur
- Middle school, Khoksa Kalyan
- St. Joseph public school, Desari
- S.d Public school, desari
- Middle school JAFRABAD

== Economy ==
Mango, lychee, betel leaf and bananas are the main trees grown in the area for horticulture. Major Indian Banks such as State Bank of India, Bank of India, Central Bank of India, Corporation Bank, Bandhan Bank and Bank of Baroda have branches here catering to the financial needs of the local population.

== Developing Desari ==
Desari Block Headquarters is situated at Desari along with police station. .Moreover, Desari Railway station connects Baurani junction in East and Hajipur in West. In last few years, People have started to consume fast food, chicken, milk etc a lot showing prosperity in nearby areas, there has been recent developments by present mukhiya Asha Kumari through various development projects.

== Culture ==
Languages spoken by the people are Bajjika and Hindi.

=== Festivals ===
Holi, Durga Puja, Deepawali and Chhath Puja are the prime festivals. People also celebrate Rakshabandhan, Janmashtmi, Shivratri, Makar Sankranti, Saraswati Puja, Republic Day, Independence Day, Nag Panchami(Vishhar Mela) and other local festivals.
