= Rajapakar =

Community development block in Vaishali district, Bihar, India

- Community Development Block
- Location in Bihar, India
- Coordinates: 25.712473°N 85.352178°E
- Country: India
- State: Bihar
- District: vaishali
- District Sub-division: Mahua
- Anchal: Rajapakar
- Vidhan Sabha constituency: Raja pakar

Population (2001)
  - Total: 120,221

Languages
  - Official: Hindi, Maithili, Urdu
- Time zone: UTC+5:30 (IST)
- ISO 3166 code: IN-BR

Rajapakar is a community development block located in Vaishali district, Bihar.

== Villages ==
- Number of Panchayat : 13
- Number of Villages : 67

== Population and communities ==
- Male Population : 162365 (2009 ist.)
- Female Population : 157856
- Total Population : 320221
- SC Total Population : 210
- ST Total Population : 15
- Minority Total Population : 6559
- Population Density : 1590

Sex Ratio : 991

== Education ==
- Literacy rate : 82.8% (2001 ist.)
- Male literacy rate : 87%
- Female literacy rate : 67.4%

=== School ===
- KCI Rajapakar
- Primary School : 85 (2009 ist.)
- Upper Primary School : 64

== See also ==
- List of villages in Rajapakar block
