= Ram Dayalu Nagar railway station =

Railway station in Muzaffarpur, Bihar, India

Ram Dayalu Nagar Railway Station
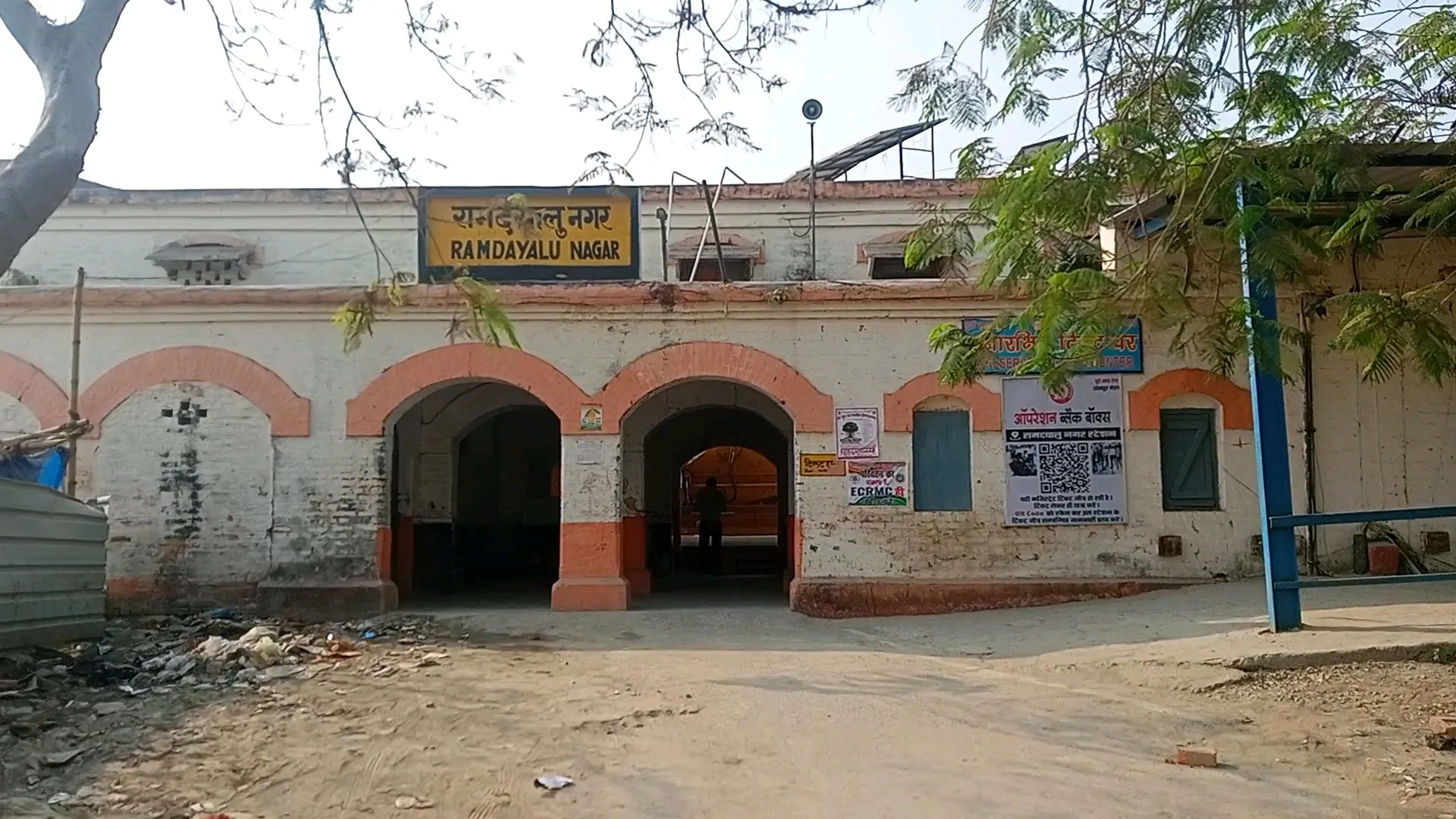
- Entrance of RD

General information
- Location: Gannipur Road, Ramdayalu Nagar, Muzaffarpur, Bihar; India
- Coordinates: 26.0977°N 85.3843°E
- Elevation: 56 metres (184 ft)
- System: Indian Railways station
- Owner: Indian Railways
- Platforms: 2
- Tracks: 4
- Connections: Auto stand

Construction
- Structure type: Standard (on-ground station)
- Parking: Yes
- Cycle facilities: Yes
- Accessible: No

Other information
- Status: Functioning
- Station code: RD
- Zone(s): East Central Railway
- Division(s): Sonpur

History
- Opened: 2 October 1909; 116 years ago
Location

Ram Dayalu Nagar railway station (station code: RD), is a railway station in Muzaffarpur district, in the Indian state of Bihar. It serves Muzaffarpur city as secondary station. The station consists of 2 platforms.

== Redevlopment ==
Ram Dayalu Nagar Railway Station in Muzaffarpur Bihar is undergoing redevelopment as part of the Amrit Bharat Station Scheme, focusing on improving amenities and enhancing integration with the city. The redevelopment work, with an investment of ₹31 crore, is already in progress.

Key features after the redevelopment include: Separate gates for entry and exit, Waiting room, Booking counter, Executive lounges & Stalls

== Trains scheduled at RAM DAYALU NAGAR - RD ==
Train services schedule
| Train No. | Train Name | Type | Arrival | Departure | Frequency |
|---|---|---|---|---|---|
| 75212 | SEE–SPJ DMU | DMU | 05:29 | 05:30 | Daily |
| 15556 | BMKI–PPTA Intercity Express | Mail/Express | 07:48 | 07:50 | Daily |
| 63267 | MFP–PPTA MEMU | MEMU | 08:15 | 08:16 | Daily |
| 55122 | SV–SPJ Passenger | Passenger | 09:28 | 09:30 | Daily |
| 63266 | PPTA–DBG MEMU | MEMU | 13:06 | 13:07 | Daily |
| 63265 | DBG–PPTA MEMU | MEMU | 17:02 | 17:03 | Daily |
| 55121 | SPJ–SV Passenger | Passenger | 17:45 | 17:47 | Daily |
| 15555 | PPTA–BMKI Intercity Express | Mail/Express | 20:28 | 20:30 | Daily |
| 75211 | SPJ–SEE DMU | DMU | 21:17 | 21:18 | Daily |
| 63268 | PPTA–MFP MEMU | MEMU | 22:06 | 22:07 | Daily |

== Development plans ==
Following the transfer of Muzaffarpur Junction from the Sonpur railway division to the Samastipur railway division, Sonpur Division initiated plans to develop Ram Dayalu Nagar as a terminal station and to establish an integrated coaching depot at Turki railway station
