= Shahpur Patori railway station =

Railway station in India

Shahpur Patori station
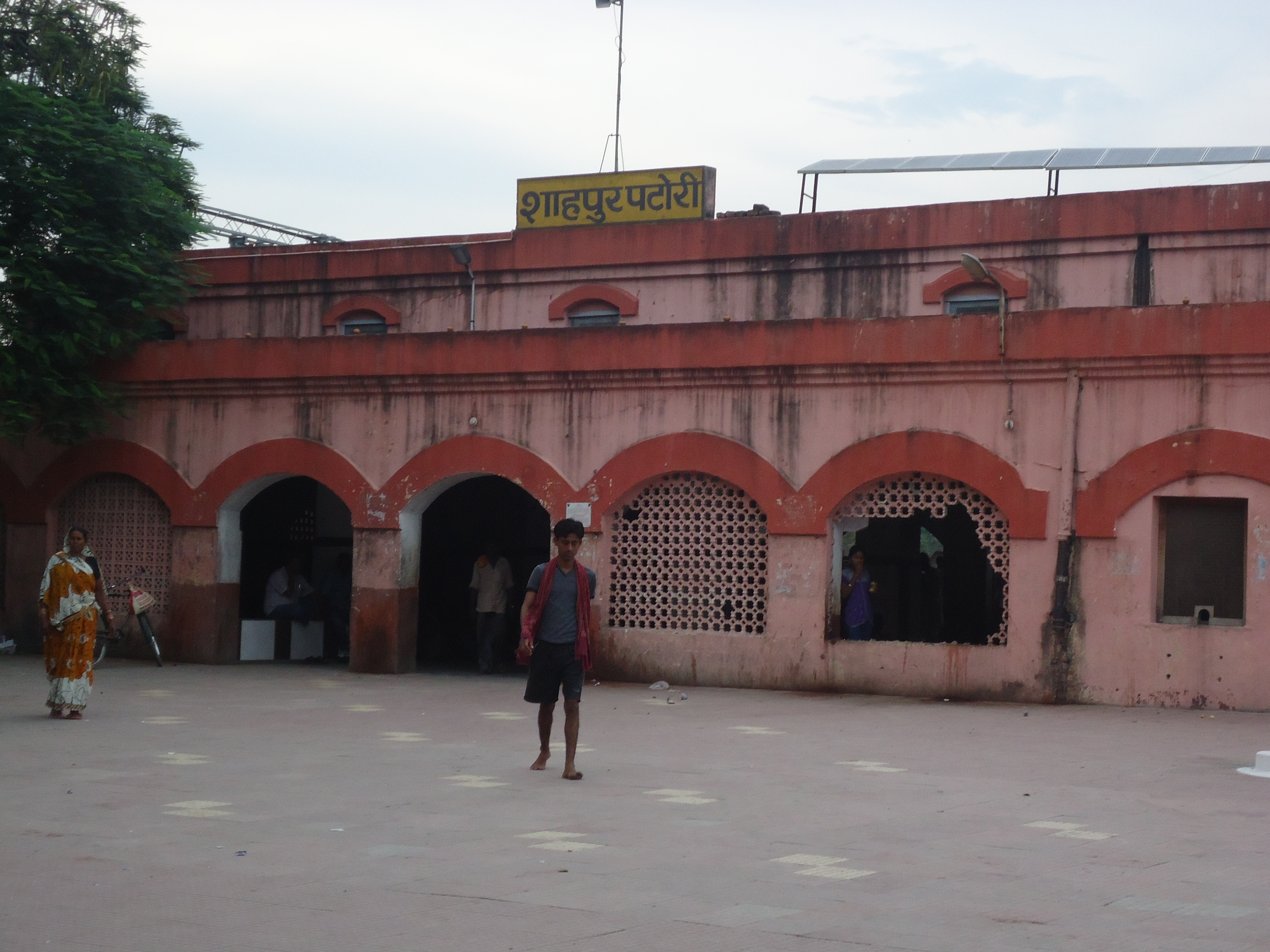

General information
- Location: India
- Coordinates: 25°38′0″N 85°35′0″E
- Elevation: 41 metres (135 ft)
- System: Indian Railways station
- Owner: Government of India
- Operator: Indian railway
- Lines: Barauni–Gorakhpur line; Barauni–Hajipur Chord Line
- Platforms: 3
- Tracks: Single track with three loop lines at the station
- Connections: changed from metre gauge to broad gauge in 1998

Construction
- Structure type: Standard (on-ground station)

Other information
- Status: Functioning
- Station code: SPP
- Zone(s): East Central Railway
- Division(s): Sonpur

History
- Opened: 1901
- Rebuilt: 2011
- Electrified: 2015
- Former names: East Indian Railway
Location

Shahpur Patori railway station (station code: SPP), is a railway station in the Sonpur railway division of East Central Railway.

The station is located in Shahpur Patori block in Samastipur district in the Indian state of Bihar. This railway station was established in 1901. It was relocated to its present place in 1938. Earlier, the location of this station was somewhere between Shahpur Undi and Tara Dhamaun villages.

An interesting story is there about naming of the station. The dispute arose between the villagers of the two adjoining villages, each wanted to name the station after the name of their villages. Finally, it was settled that the 'Shahpur' word would be taken from the village name Shahpur Undi and 'Patori' name would be taken from the village name Bahadurpur Patori and thus the name 'Shahpur Patori' was given.

On those days, the steam engines running on this route used to go at the bank of Baya river for filling water. A special railway track was there for this service. This railway track was passing between the buildings of present-day Bich Bajzar before ultimately reaching at the bank of the Baya river. A well (still existing) with the pulley system was there to uplift the water. The remains of this track could not be found now because it is buried under the earth. But a narrow lane of land passing from station to the bank of the Baya river still belongs to the Indian Railways. Shahpur Patori railway station has two platforms.
