= Bhagwanpur (community development block) =

Community development block in Vaishali district, Bihar, India

Bhagwanpur भगवानपुर
- Community Development Block
- Location in Bihar, India
- Coordinates: 26.086851°N 84.679993°E
- Country: India
- State: Bihar
- Region: Mithila
- District: Vaishali
- District Sub-division: Hajipur
- Anchal: Bhagwanpur
- Vidhan Sabha constituency: Lalganj
- Named for: C. D. Block

Government
  - Type: Community development block

Population (2001)
  - Total: 162,213

Languages
  - Official: Hindi
- Time zone: UTC+5:30 (IST)
- ISO 3166 code: IN-BR

Bhagwanpur (in Hindi : भगवानपुर) is a block in Vaishali district, Bihar state. According to the census website, all blocks in Bihar state are named C.D. Blocks (community development blocks)

== Major roads ==
NH-77

== Villages ==
- Number of Panchayats : 21
- Number of Villages : 99

== Population and communities ==
- Male Population : 84457 (2009 est.)
- Female Population : 77756
- Total Population : 162213
- SC Total Population : 32346
- ST Total Population : 0
- Minority Total Population : 16736
- Population Density : 1371
- Sex Ratio : 921

== Public distribution system ==
- Nos of HHs : 25121
- BPL Card Holders : 23187
- Antodaya Card Holders : 4475
- Annapurna Card Holders : 313
- APL : 22676
- Nos of Fair Price Shops: 73

== Education ==
- Literacy rate : 53.3%(2001 ist.)
- Male literacy rate : 65.6%
- Female literacy rate : 39.8%

=== Schools ===
- Primary School : 88(2009 ist.)
- Upper Primary School : 71

== Banking ==
- Number of banks : 9
