= Sonpur railway division =

Railway division of India

Sonpur Railway Division
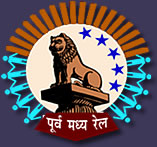

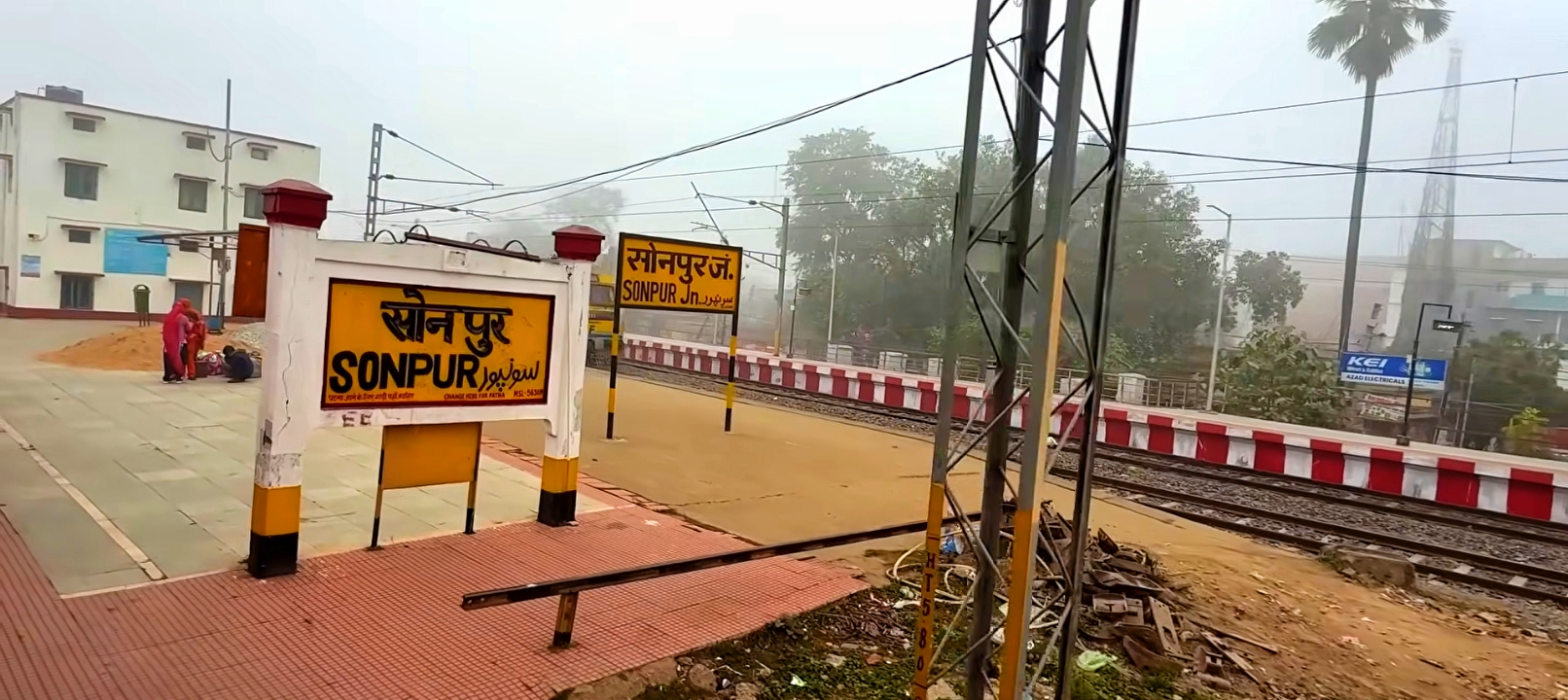

Overview
- Operator: Indian Railways
- Headquarters: Sonpur ,Bihar
- Reporting mark: SEE
- Locale: Bihar ,India
- Dates of operation: 1951 - Present–
- Predecessor: North Eastern Railway zone (1978-2002)

Technical
- Track gauge: Broad

Sonpur railway division is one of the five railway divisions under the jurisdiction of the East Central Railway (ECR) zone of Indian Railways.

The division's headquarters is located at Sonpur in Bihar, India.

The overall in-charge of the division is the Divisional Railway Manager (DRM), currently Shri Amit Saran.

== History ==
Sonpur Railway Division was first established on 21 October 1978 as part of the North Eastern Railway zone (NER) zone. This creation marked the beginning of Sonpur's administrative and operational responsibilities over key rail routes in North Bihar, enhancing connectivity across the region.

=== East Central Railway and division change ===
The East Central Railway zone itself was officially created on 8 September 1996, as part of Indian Railways’ reorganization plan to improve efficiency and management. Later, with the reorganization effective 1 October 2002, both Sonpur and Samastipur railway division were shifted from the North Eastern Railway to the newly formed East Central Railway zone.

=== Operational area expansion ===
On 1 January 2005, Garhara Yard and the Dinkar Gram–Simaria stations—previously part of the Danapur railway division were incorporated into the Sonpur Division. This expansion significantly increased the division's operational area, enabling better management of freight and passenger services in central Bihar.

== Major events ==
=== 20th century ===
- 21 October 1978: Sonpur Railway Division was established under the North Eastern Railway zone.
- 8 September 1996: The East Central Railway (ECR) zone was officially created by Indian Railways.

=== 21st century ===
- 1 October 2002: Sonpur Division was transferred from the North Eastern Railway to the newly formed East Central Railway zone.
- 1 January 2005: Garhara Yard and the Dinkar Gram–Simaria section were reallocated from Danapur Division to Sonpur Division.
- 2011: Major station redevelopment work and track doubling between Sonpur and Hajipur were initiated.
- August 2015: Construction of the Digha–Sonpur rail-cum-road bridge (J.P. Setu) was completed.
- 3 February 2016: Train operations officially commenced over the Digha–Sonpur rail section of J.P. Setu.
- April 2022: Sonpur became the first division in East Central Railway to fully restore onboard services after the COVID-19 pandemic.
- February 2023: Electrification of approximately 95% of Sonpur Division's railway network was successfully completed.
- 2024–25: The division recorded a revenue of ₹376 crore and led the zone in ticket fine recovery.

== Geography ==
The division stretches from Chhapra in the west to Katihar in the east, forming a crescent shape along the northern banks of the Ganges River. It extends 136 kilometers northwards, crowned by Muzaffarpur at the top, while its base spreads from Hajipur to Bachhwara over 71 kilometers. Sonpur railway division area starts from Goldinganj (GJH) in the west in Saran.

The division has two main routes from Hajipur to Barauni:

- Longer route: via Muzaffarpur–Samastipur–Bachhwara.
- Shorter chord line: via Shahpur Patoree–Bachhwara, approximately 65 kilometers shorter than the Muzaffarpur route.

The Shahpur Patoree route serves as the main freight corridor (Chhapra–Katihar, 316 km), while passenger traffic primarily uses the longer Muzaffarpur route. The eastern part of the division is challenging due to poor embankments, fragile riverbanks, and flooding from the Kosi and Ganges rivers.

With the opening of the Digha–Ganga Bridge, passenger traffic increased significantly, resulting in congestion on the Hajipur–Sonpur section. The division also has a high density of level crossings, with one crossing approximately every 1.6 kilometers. .

== Revenue ==
In the financial year 2022–23, the division recorded a revenue of ₹1,058.57 crore, with freight and passenger services contributing approximately 37% and 56% respectively.

Barauni Junction is the highest revenue-generating railway station in the Sonpur Division and also ranks among the top 100 booking stations of Indian Railways and in ECR Barauni Junction Stand at 13th Position.

Previously, Muzaffarpur Junction was the highest revenue-generating railway station of the Sonpur Railway Division (3rd highest in ECR), but after the administrative transfer of Muzaffarpur Junction, Sonpur no longer ranks even in the top 10.

== Interchange points ==
The division has 11 interchange points in total.

=== 3 inter-railway interchange points ===
- Eastern direction with Katihar division of Northeast Frontier Railway.
- Eastern Railway's Malda division at Sabdalpur.
- Western direction with Varanasi division of East Central Railway at Chhapra Gramin.

=== Inter-divisional interchange points ===
It is having 8 inter-divisional interchange points

- With Samastipur division at Ram Dayalu Nagar railway station (Muzaffarpur), Samastipur (Narhan and Muktapur), Khagaria, and Mansi.
- With Danapur division at Dinkar Gram Simaria and Pahleja Ghat.

== Stations and facilities ==
As of now, the division comprises 95 stations, including: 68 crossing stations, 4 flag stations, 23 halt stations

Out of these 68 stations: All have UTS (Unreserved Ticketing System) facilities., 13 stations are equipped with PRS (Passenger Reservation System), 20 stations have combined UTS-PRS terminals. The list includes the stations under the Sonpur railway division and their station category.

Category of station	No. of stations	Names of stations
A 1 Category	0	
A Category	3	Hajipur Junction, Barauni Junction, Khagaria Junction
B Category	5	Sonpur Junction, Begusarai, Dalsinghsarai, Naugachia, Mansi Junction
C Category	0	-
D Category	15	BCA, DOL, KRBP, DES, DGA, GRL, CRR, KUE, MSK, MNO, MOG, SPP, SMO, THB, LAK
E Category	45	AYRN, LKN, NNR, PSR, SKJ, BNR, STLR, VPDA, DKGS, ATNR, BAGL, BKHR, BUJ, BTHL, CSR, CKRD, DPL, DUBH, GAI, GJH, HUFP, KPGM, KTRH, KHQ, KHI, LLJP, NNNL, NYO, NRPA, NAZJ, PMU, PHLG, RD, SDG, SAI, STJT, SIHO, SLT, TGA, TIL, TUR, UJP, UMNR, VSHI, SBDP
F Category; Halt Station	25	-
Total	94	-

== Major destinations ==
Direct train services from Sonpur division connect to major cities across India, including:

Ahmedabad, Amritsar, Ajmer, Ambala, Bhagalpur, Bengaluru, Mysuru, Bikaner, Chandigarh, Chennai, Delhi, Dehradun, Dibrugarh, Ernakulam, Guwahati, Gwalior, Gandhidham, Gonda, Jammu Tawi, Jodhpur, Kolkata, Okha, Mumbai, Patna, Pune, Puri, Ranchi, Tatanagar, Surat, Valsad, Udaipur, Agartala, Silchar, and others.
