= Vaishali district =

City in Bihar, India

- District of Bihar
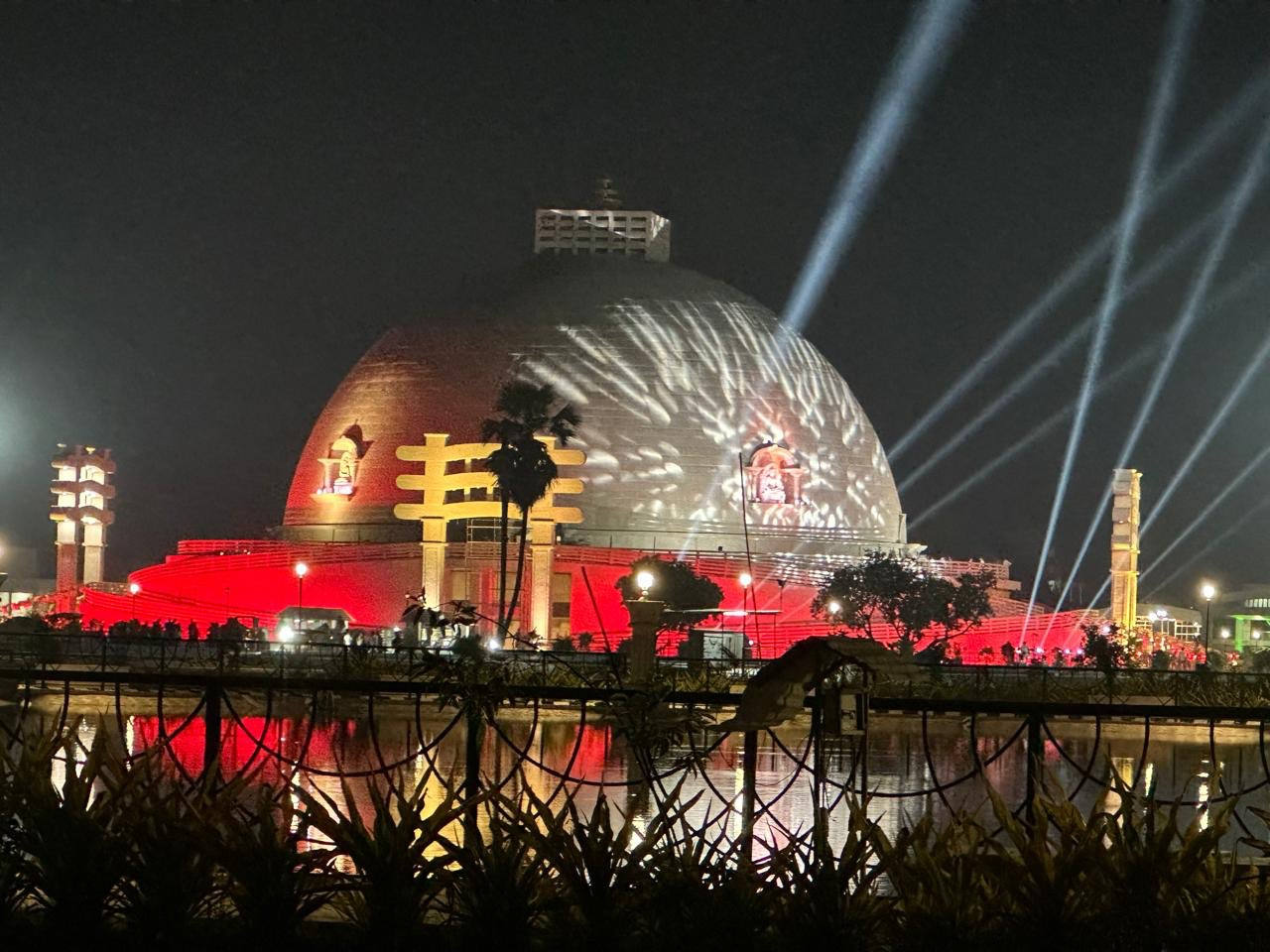
- Relic Stupa of Vaishali

- Country: India
- State: Bihar
- Division: Tirhut
- Established: 10 December 1972
- Headquarters: Hajipur

Government
  - Educationist: Shri Rajdeo Ray
  - Lok Sabha constituencies: Hajipur, Vaishali
  - Vidhan Sabha constituencies: Hajipur, Lalganj, Vaishali, Mahua, Raja Pakar, Raghopur, Mahnar, Patepur

Area
  - Total: 2,036 km^{2} (786 sq mi)
- Elevation: 51 m (167 ft)

Population (2011)
  - Total: 3,495,021
  - Density: 1,717/km^{2} (4,446/sq mi)

Demographics
  - Literacy: 66.60%
  - Sex ratio: 1.895 ♂/♀

Language
  - Official: Hindi
  - Additional official: English
  - Regional Languages: Bajjika
- Time zone: UTC+05:30 (IST)
- PIN: 8441xx (Vaishali)
- Major highways: NH 22, NH 31, NH 322
- HDI (2016): ▲0.407
- Website: Official website

Vaishali district is a district in the Indian state of Bihar. It is a part of Tirhut division. Vaishali is known for being the birthplace of Mahavira of the Jain religion. Hajipur, its largest city and district headquarters, is known for its banana forest. The district is connected via the NH-77 and NH-322 highways, Gandhi Setu and Jay Prakash Setu (JP Setu) Bridges over(Holy) Ganga River which connect the state capital Patna, the division headquarters Muzaffarpur, and the eastward district Samastipur.

== History ==
=== Ancient Vaishali ===
According to legend, Vaishali derives its name from King Vishala, a son of Ikshvaku who founded the city. Vaishali was the capital of the vibrant Licchavi republic and was closely associated with the early histories of both Buddhism and Jainism. In that period, Vaishali was an ancient metropolis and the capital city of the republic of the Vajji confederation, which covered most of the Himalayan Gangetic region of present-day Bihar. Magadha rulers of the Shishunaga dynasty shifted their capital from Pataliputra to Vaishali.

=== Post-Independence ===
Vaishali became a district when it was split from Muzaffarpur in 1972.

== Geography ==
The Vaishali district occupies an area of 2,036 square kilometres (786 sq mi),

== Economy ==
In 2006 the Ministry of Panchayati Raj named Vaishali one of the country's 250 most backward districts (out of a total of 640). It is one of the 38 districts in Bihar currently receiving funds from the Backward Regions Grant Fund Programme (BRGF).

== Demographics ==
Historical population
Year	Pop.	±% p.a.
1901	737,793	—
1911	761,720	+0.32%
1921	737,475	−0.32%
1931	787,287	+0.66%
1941	868,565	+0.99%
1951	942,472	+0.82%
1961	1,133,086	+1.86%
1971	1,348,990	+1.76%
1981	1,662,527	+2.11%
1991	2,146,065	+2.59%
2001	2,718,421	+2.39%
2011	3,495,021	+2.54%

Religions in Vaishali district (2011)
Religion	Percent
Hinduism	90.20%
Islam	9.56%
Other or not Stated	0.24%

According to the 2011 census Vaishali district has a population of 3,495,021, roughly equal to the nation of Panama or the US state of Connecticut. This gives it a ranking of 86th in India (out of a total of 640). The district has a population density of 1,717 inhabitants per square kilometre (4,450/sq mi) . Its population growth rate over the decade 2001-2011 was 28.58%. Vaishali has a sex ratio of 892 females for every 1000 males, and a literacy rate of 66.60%. 6.67% of the population lives in urban areas. Scheduled Castes and Scheduled Tribes make up 21.12% and 0.07% of the population respectively.

=== Languages ===
Languages of Vaishali district (2011)
1. 'Other' Hindi (69.9%)
2. Hindi (25.1%)
3. Urdu (4.80%)
4. Others (0.22%)

At the time of the 2011 Census of India, 95.09% of the population in the district spoke Hindi and 4.80% Urdu as their first language. 69.88% of the population recorded their language as 'Other' under Hindi, while Hindi itself was only reported by 25.10%. The language of the region is Bajjika, while Bhojpuri is spoken in the extreme western parts of the district.

== Flora and fauna ==
In 1997, the district became home to the Barela Salim Ali Zubba Saheni Wildlife Sanctuary, which has an area of 2 km^{2} (0.8 mi^{2}).

== Administration ==
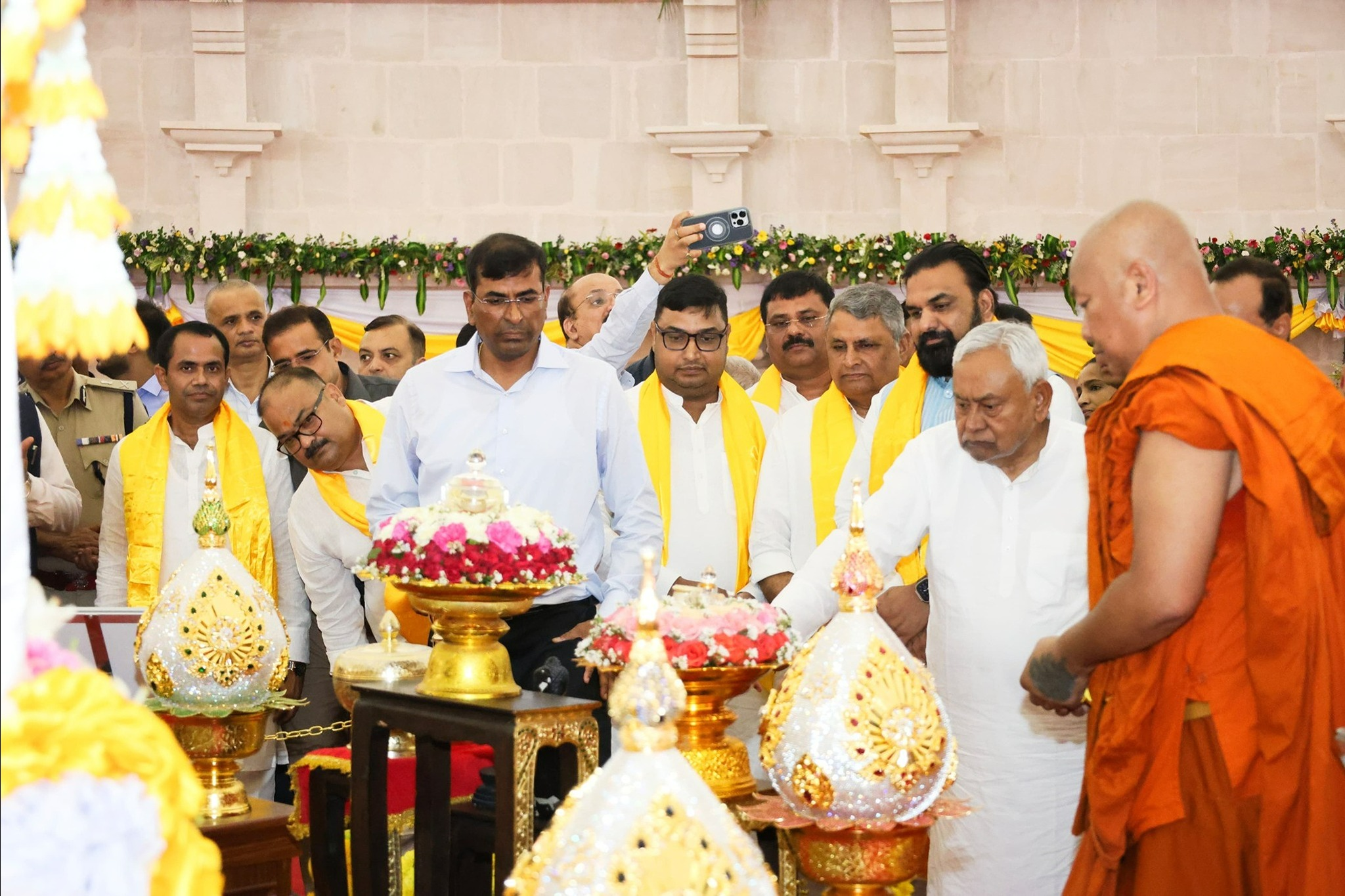
Leaders of Bihar, Nitish Kumar, Samrat Chaudhary, Jayant Raj Kushwaha, Umesh Singh Kushwaha, Siddharth Patel and others inaugurating Budhha Samyak Darshan Museum and Memorial Stupa in Vaishali.

The Vaishali district (headquartered at Hajipur) is headed by an IAS officer of the rank of District Magistrate (DM).

The district has got 1422 inhabited villages under 290 Gram Panchayats and 30 territorial police stations.

=== Tehsils ===
Vaishali district comprises three tehsils or Sub-divisions, each headed by a Sub-Divisional Magistrate (SDM):

1. Hajipur
2. Mahnar
3. Mahua

=== Blocks ===
These Tehsils are further divided into 16 Blocks, each headed by a Block Development Officer (BDO)

1. Bhagwanpur
2. Bidupur
3. Chehra Kalan
4. Desari
5. Goraul
6. Hajipur
7. Jandaha
8. Lalganj
9. Mahnar
10. Mahua
11. Patedhi Belsar
12. Patepur
13. Raghopur
14. Rajapakar
15. Sahdei Buzurg
16. Vaishali

== See also ==
- List of tehsils in Vaishali district
- List of villages in Vaishali district
- Vaishali (ancient city)
