= List of villages in Vaishali district =

Village of Vaishali district

Vaishali district of Bihar, India is divided into 3 sub-divisions and 16 Blocks. There are total 290 panchayat and 1414 villages.

== List of villages by block ==
- List of villages in Bhagwanpur block
- List of villages in Bidupur block
- List of villages in Chehrakala block
- List of villages in Desri block
- List of villages in Goraul block
- List of villages in Hajipur block
- List of villages in Jandaha block
- List of villages in Lalganj block
- List of villages in Mahnar block
- List of villages in Mahua block
- List of villages in Patedhi Belsar block
- List of villages in Patepur block
- List of villages in Raghopur block
- List of villages in Rajapakar block
- List of villages in Sahdei Buzurg block
- List of villages in Vaishali block

== Village list ==
- Ababakarpur
- Abulhasanpur
- Adalpur
- Afazalpur Dhobghati Saidpur
- Agrail Khurdh
- Akbar Malahi
- Akhtiyarpur Sehan
- Alinagar Levdhan
- Alipur Hatta
- Amer
- Amritpur
- Anawarpur
- Andharwara
- Ararah
- Arniya
- Asoee Lachhiram
- Atwarpur Sisaula
- Awabakarpur Koahi
- Azampur
- Azizpur Chande
- Bafapur Banthu
- Bahrampur
- Bahsi Saidpur
- Bahuara
- Bahuara
- Baikunth Pur
- Bajitpur Chak Kasturi
- Bajitpur Saidat
- Bakadh
- Bakarpur
- Bakhri Barai
- Baksama
- Baligaon
- Banthu
- Bardiha Turki
- Basanta Jahanabad
- Basantpur
- Basti Sarsikan
- Basudevpur Chandel
- Bela Dargah
- Belsar
- Berai
- Bhadwas
- Bhagwanpur Ratti
- Bhagwatpur
- Bhairokhara
- Bhalui
- Bhanpur Barewa
- Bhautauli Bhagwan
- Bhikhanpura
- Bhualpur Urf Bahadurpur
- Bidupr
- Bihwarpur
- Bishunpur Baladhari
- Bishunpura
- Borhan Urf Rasulpur Gaus
- Chainpur
- Chak Alahdad
- Chak Gulamuddin
- Chakjamal
- Chakath Kursi Kushiyari
- Chakfaiz Asif
- Chakjado
- Chaksikandar (Kalyanpur)
- Chaksingar
- Chaksurupan
- Chakunda Urf Milki
- Chamarhara
- Chandwara
- Chand Sarai
- Chandpur Fatah
- Chandpura Nankhar
- Chechar
- Chehra Kalan
- Chhaurahi
- Chintamanipur
- Dabhaich
- Dadhua
- Dargah Bela
- Daud Nagar
- Daudnagar
- Daulat Pur Dewaria
- Daulatpur Chandi
- Dayalpur
- Dedhpura
- Desari
- Dharampur Ramrai
- Dighikala East
- Dighikala West
- Dih Buchauli
- Dilawarpur Gobardhan
- Enayat Nagar
- Fatahpur Pakri
- Fatehpur
- Fulwaria
- Gadai Sarai
- Ghauspur Chak Majahid
- Ghataro Chaturbhuj Middle
- Ghataro Chaturbhuj South
- Godhiya Chaman
- Goraul Bhagwanpur
- Gorigama
- Goshpur Ezra
- Govindpur Jhakhraha
- Govindpur Bela
- Gurmiya
- Harlochanpur Sukki
- Harprasad
- Harpur Phatikwara
- Harwanshpur Banthu
- Hasanpur North
- Hasanpur Osti
- Hasanpur South
- Hazrat Jandaha
- Hilalpur
- Husaina Khurd
- Ishmailpur
- Ismailpur
- Jafarpatti
- Jafrabad
- Jafrabad Tok
- Jahangirpur
- Jahangirpur Patedha
- Jahangirpur Salkhanni
- Jahangirpur Sham
- Jalalpur Birbhan
- Kaila Jalalpur
- Gangti
- Jarang Rampur
- Jatkauli
- Jurawanpur
- Jurawanpur Barari
- Jurawanpur Karari
- Kanchanpur
- Kanhauli Dhanraj
- Kanhauli Vishanparsi
- Kartaha
- Kartaha Buzurg
- Karhari
- Karhatiya Buzurg
- Karnauti
- Karnezi
- Kashipur Chakbibi
- Katar Mala
- Kathaulia
- Kernpura
- Khaje Chand Chhapra
- Khanpur Pakri
- Kharauna
- Khesrahi
- Khilwat
- Khopi
- Khoyajpur Basti
- Kiratpur Raja Ram
- Kutubpur
- Ladho
- Lagurao Vilnupur
- Lawapur Mahnar
- Lawapur Narayan
- Laxmanpur
- Laxmi Narayanpur
- Laxmipur Barhbatta
- Lodi Pur
- Loma
- Madarna
- Madhopur Mahodat
- Madhopur Ram
- Mahamdabad
- Mahammadpur Turi
- Mahindwara
- Mahipura
- Mahisaur
- Mahthi Dhramchand
- Mahua Mukundpur
- Mahua Singhrai
- Maile
- Majhauli
- Majhauli
- Majhauli Mahmadpur Buzurg
- Majlispur
- Mallikpur
- Malpur
- Mandai Dih
- Manganpur
- Mangurahi
- Manora
- Mansinghpur Bijhrauli
- Mansurpur Halaiya
- Manua
- Marui
- Matiya
- Mathna Milik
- Mathura
- Maudah Buzurg
- Maudah Chatur
- Mazrohi Urf Saharia
- Meghpur
- Mirpur Patadh
- Mirza Nagar
- Mishraulia Afzalpur
- Miya Bairo
- Mohamadpur Pojha
- Mohammadpur
- Mohanpur
- Mohiuddinpur (Dhala)
- Mohiuddinpur Garahi
- Mohmadpur
- Mukundpur Bhath
- Murauwatpur
- Musapur Subodh
- Nagwa
- Narayanpur
- Narayanpur Buzurg
- Narharpur
- Nari Khurd
- Naurangpur
- Nawanagar
- Naya Gaon West
- Nayagaon East
- Nilo Rukundpur
- Nirpur
- Pachpaika
- Paharpur West
- Paharpur East
- Paharpur Vishunpur
- Pahetiya
- Pakauli
- Panapur Langa
- Paura Madan Singh
- Peerapur
- Phulad
- Pirapur Mathura
- Piroi Shamsuddin
- Pohiyar Buzurg
- Prataptand East
- Prataptand West
- Purainia
- Puran Thand
- Purkhauli
- RaghopurDiyara
- Raghopur East
- Raghopur Narsanda
- Raghunathpur Imadpur
- Rahimapur
- Rahimpur
- Rajapakar North
- Rajapakar South
- Rajasan
- Ramdauli
- Rampur Bakhra
- Rampur Chandrabhan Urf Dagru
- Rampur Ratnakar
- Rampur Shyamchand
- Rasalpur Urf Madhaul
- Rasulpur Fatah
- Rasulpur Habib
- Rasulpur Korigawan
- Rasulpur Mobarak
- Rasulpur Purshottam
- Rasulpur Turki
- Ratanpura
- Rikhar
- Rustampur
- Sahatha
- Sahdei Buzurg
- Said Mohamm
- Sihma kanth
- Jarang rampur
