= Naurangpur (disambiguation) =

Naurangpur is a village in Gurgaon Mandal, Gurgaon District, Haryana state, India.

Naurangpur may also refer to the following places in India:

- Naurangpur, Bhulath, Kapurthala district, Punjab State
- Naurangpur, Punjab, Jalandhar district, Punjab State
- Naurangpur, a village in Uttar Pradesh, on the Sarayan river
- Naurangpur, a village in Mahnar block, Vaishali district, Bihar state
- Norangpur, one of two villages in Uttar Pradesh, India
- Nourangpur, a village in Madhya Pradesh, India
- Nourangpur, a village in Uttar Pradesh, India
- Narangpur, a village in Uttar Pradesh, India

== See also ==
- Narangpur, a village in Kapurthala district, Punjab State, India
