= List of villages in Sahdei Buzurg block =

This is a list of villages in Sahdei Buzurg block, Vaishali district, Bihar state, India.

STCode	DTCode	SubdtCode	VillCode	Villname
10	18	015	0000	Sahdai Buzurg
10	18	015	0001	Tayabpur Kharij Jama
10	18	015	0002	Rasulpur Jilani
10	18	015	0003	Ganiari
10	18	015	0004	Jagdishpur Beli
10	18	015	0005	Chak Ali Sher
10	18	015	0006	Shampur Bhairo
10	18	015	0007	Ibrahimpur Shiudarshan
10	18	015	0008	Fatehpur Buzurg
10	18	015	0009	Tal Chatra Urf Chainpur Bagail
10	18	015	0010	Tal Chatra Urf Sarae Dhanesh
10	18	015	0011	Tal Chatra Urf Bikrampur
10	18	015	0012	Tal Chatra Urf Sarae Dhanesh
10	18	015	0013	Matiya
10	18	015	0014	Majruhi Urf Sahoria
10	18	015	0015	Jhil Beli Majrohi Raghunandan
10	18	015	0016	Talbeli
10	18	015	0017	Paharpur Toi
10	18	015	0018	Math Toi
10	18	015	0019	Shahpur Toi
10	18	015	0020	Chainpur Baghail
10	18	015	0021	Majruhi Raghunandan
10	18	015	0022	Bikrampur
10	18	015	0023	Sarae Dhanesh
10	18	015	0024	Sahdai Buzurg
10	18	015	0025	Shaikhopur
10	18	015	0026	Shaikhopur Tok Bikrampur
10	18	015	0027	Shaikhopur
10	18	015	0028	Tal Chatra Urf Sarae Dhanesh
10	18	015	0029	Chak Jamal
10	18	015	0030	Bazidpur Chak Kasturi
10	18	015	0031	NayagaonUrfMohammadpurMuradpur
10	18	015	0032	Hitanpur Shankar
10	18	015	0033	Sultanpur
10	18	015	0034	Marauatpur
10	18	015	0035	Raepura
10	18	015	0036	Khaspatti
10	18	015	0037	Chak Faiz
10	18	015	0038	Balia
10	18	015	0039	Sahdai Khurd
10	18	015	0040	Rampur Kumharkol
10	18	015	0041	Kumharkol Buzurg
10	18	015	0042	Afzalpur
10	18	015	0043	Behzadi
10	18	015	0044	Talkhajurain
10	18	015	0045	Chak Umar
10	18	015	0046	Baghauti
10	18	015	0047	Chandpura
10	18	015	0048	Baghailpur
10	18	015	0049	Rampur Baghail
10	18	015	0050	Chandpur
10	18	015	0051	Pohiar Buzurg
10	18	015	0052	Alampur Zamin
10	18	015	0053	Pohiar Urf Rasulpur Wahid
10	18	015	0054	Dubha
10	18	015	0055	Salha Urf Mahiuddinpur
10	18	015	0056	Mansai Urf Mohammadpur Said
10	18	015	0057	Mohammadour Pohiar
10	18	015	0058	Dadanpur
10	18	015	0059	Pohiari
10	18	015	0060	Rampur Khan
10	18	015	0061	Salempur
10	18	015	0062	Chak Pahar
10	18	015	0063	Lodipur Chak Pahar Urf Rampur
10	18	015	0064	Samhuta
10	18	015	0065	Derhpura
10	18	015	0066	Jangi Pakahi

== See also ==
- List of villages in Vaishali district
