= Yogendra Shukla =

Indian revolutionary (1896–1960)

- योगेन्द्र शुक्ल
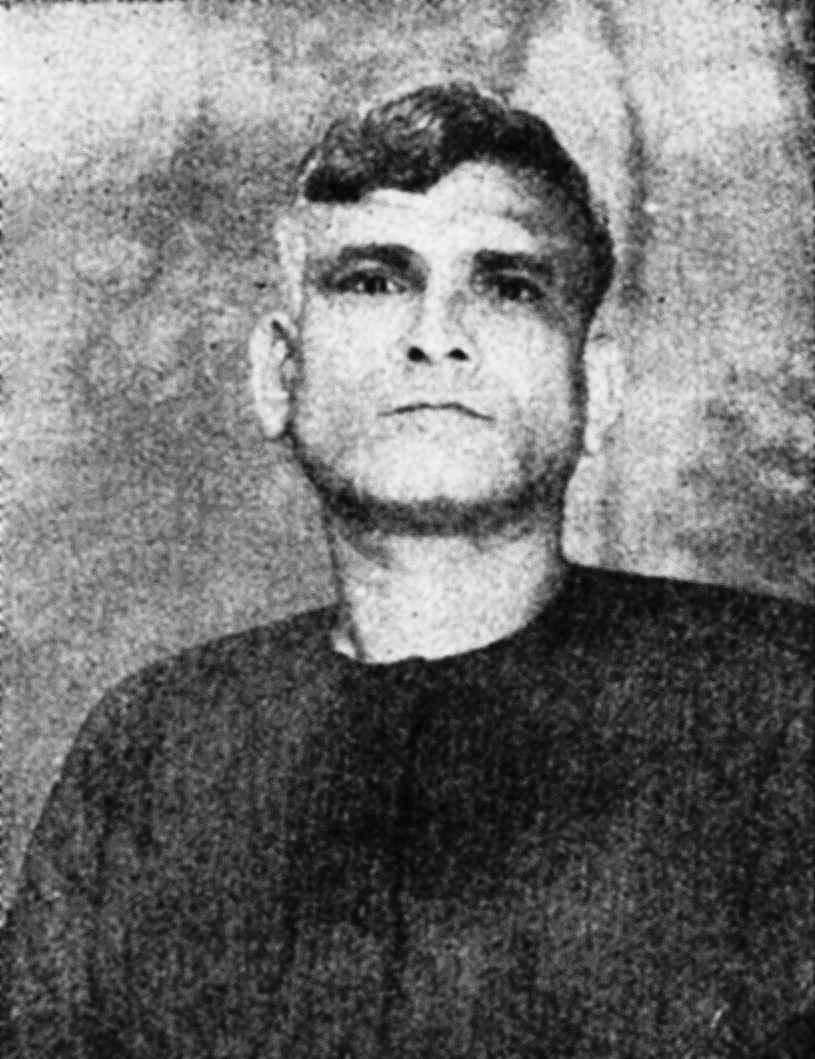
- Born: 1896
- Died: 19 November 1960 (aged 63–64)
- Occupations: Indian revolutionary and freedom fighter

Yogendra Shukla (Hindi: योगेन्द्र शुक्ल; 1896 – 19 November 1960) was an Indian nationalist and freedom fighter, notable for his contributions in the state of Bihar. He was incarcerated in the Cellular Jail, also known as Kala Pani, and was a founding member of the Hindustan Socialist Republican Association (HSRA). Shukla, in collaboration with Basawon Singh (Sinha), was also instrumental in establishing the Congress Socialist Party in Bihar.

== Background ==
Yogendra Shukla, along with his nephew Baikuntha Shukla (15 May 1907 – 14 May 1934), originated from Jalalpur village in the Muzaffarpur district of the Bengal Presidency (present-day Vaishali district in Bihar). He was born in a Bhumihar brahmin family. Between 1932 and 1937, Yogendra was incarcerated in the Cellular Jail, known as Kalapani, as a prominent leader of the revolutionary movement in Bihar and Uttar Pradesh. He gained renown for his various exploits and was a close associate of revolutionaries Sardar Bhagat Singh and Batukeshwar Dutt, even playing a role in their training. Over his lifetime, he was imprisoned for over sixteen and a half years due to his involvement in revolutionary activities. His health deteriorated significantly due to the harsh torture he suffered in various jails across India. At the time of his death, he was suffering from illness and had lost his sight.

== Kala Pani ==
In October 1932, as per the instructions of the Governor in Council, the Judicial Secretary A.C. Davies requested the Deputy Inspector General (DIG) of the Criminal Investigation Department (CID) to compile a list of revolutionary convicts. The list was to include details such as the offences for which they were convicted, the sentences imposed, and a brief overview of their involvement in the revolutionary movement, with the purpose of moving them to the Celullar Jail in the Andaman Islands. In response, the DIG (CID) suggested several individuals, including Yogendra Shukla, Basawon Singh (Sinha), Shyamdeo Narayan alias Ram Singh, Ishwar Dayal Singh, Kedar Mani Shukla, Mohit Chandra Adhikari and Ram Pratap Singh.

Yogendra Shukla, Kedar Mani Shukla and Shyamdeo Narayan were transferred to the Andaman Islands in December 1932. Yogendra Shukla’s relocation to Hazaribagh Central Jail was a direct consequence of his 46-days hunger strike. When Sri Krishna Sinha established the first Congress ministry in Bihar in 1937, he championed the cause of political prisoners. His ministry, standing firm on this issue, resigned on 15 February 1938. This act prompted the Viceroy to accede to their demands, leading to the release of Yogendra Shukla and other political prisoners in March 1938.

== After release from Kala Pani ==
Yogendra Shukla joined the Indian National Congress after his release and was elected vice-chairman of the Muzaffarpur District Congress Committee. He was also elected a member of the All India Congress Committee in 1938 but later joined the Congress Socialist Party at the instance of Jayaprakash Narayan. He was arrested in 1940, soon after he became a member of Central Committee of the All India Kisan Sabha in place of Swami Sahajanand Saraswati.

== Quit India Movement ==
When Mahatma Gandhi launched the Quit India Movement in August 1942, Yogendra Shukla scaled the wall of Hazaribagh Central Jail along with Jayaprakash Narayan, Suraj Narayan Singh, Gulab Chand Gupta, Ramnandan Mishra and Shaligram Singh intending to start the underground movement for freedom. As Jayaprakash Narayan was ill then, Shukla walked a distance to Gaya with Jayaprakash Narayan on his shoulders, a distance of about 124 kilometres.

The British Government announced a reward of Rs. 5000 for the arrest of Shukla. He was arrested on 7 December 1942, at Muzaffarpur. The government believed that one day before his arrest Shukla had helped four prisoners escape from Muzaffarpur jail. They were Surajdeo Singh, Ram Babu Kalwar, Brahmanand Gupta and Ganesh Rai.

Yogendra Shukla was lodged in Buxar Jail and kept in bar fetters for three years. In March 1944, he launched hunger-strike in the Buxar Jail.

== During and after Independence ==
He was released in April 1946. In 1958, he was nominated a member of the Bihar Legislative Council on behalf of the Praja Socialist Party and continued there till 1960. In 1960, he was taken seriously ill as a result of long years of prison life. He died on 19 November 1960.

== See also ==
- Chandradeo Prasad Verma
- Ajit Kumar Mehta
- Upendra Nath Verma
