= Laxmanpur, Vaishali =

Laxmanpur
- Village
- Location in Bihar, India Laxmanpur (India)
- Coordinates: 25.743°N 85.45°E
- Country: India
- State: Bihar
- Division: Tirhut
- District: Vaishali
- Block: Jandaha
- Elevation: 40 m (130 ft)

Languages
  - Spoken: Hindi, Bajjika
- Time zone: UTC+5:30 (IST)
- PIN: 844122
- Telephone code: 91- 6227- XX XX XX
- ISO 3166 code: IN-BR
- Vehicle registration: BR-31

Laxmanpur is a village in Vaishali district within the Indian state of Bihar. It is about 11 kilometers southwest of Mahua, 24 kilometres (15 mi) northeast of the district headquarters, Hajipur, 34 kilometres (21 mi) northeast of Patna, the state capital. Laxmanpur is 875 kilometres (544 mi) south east of New Delhi and 1,490 kilometres (930 mi) northeast of Mumbai. The nearest railway station is Desari, which is 13 kilometres from the main village.

== Geography ==
Laxmanpur is located in the sub Himalayan zone, in the northeastern part of India, in an alluvial fertile plain drained by the Ganges, which flows from west to east, and its tributaries Gandak and Koshi, that regularly flood parts of the surrounding plains. The average elevation above sea level is 40 metres (130 ft).

== Climate ==
Laxmanpur has a humid subtropical climate (Köppen: Cwa), with very hot summers and cool winters. The temperature is cold during the winter, with chilly winter nights and foggy or sunny days from November to February and the temperatures range between 6 and 25 °C (43 and 77 °F). It is very hot in the summer, from late March to early June, when the temperatures range around 20–40 °C (68–104 °F). The monsoon season begins in late June and ends in late September. During the monsoon season, temperatures are between 25 and 36 °C (77 and 97 °F) and the rainfall is around 200–300 millimetres (7.9–11.8 in).

== Crops ==
It is rich of weeds, such as ammannia and sesbania, and other plants and trees like mango orchards, palmyra and date palms, siris, jackfruits and red cotton trees. The cultivated area produces bananas, lychees, mango, bamboo, rice, sugarcane and other food grains.

A canal passes from Laxmanpur for irrigation.

== Administration ==
Laxmanpur is situated in Laxmipur Brahambatta Panchyat. The police station for Laxmanpur is in Jandaha.

The Member of the Legislative Assembly (MLA) Lt.Raj Kishore Sinha(1995-2000 Vaishali Assembly Constituency) was from Laxmanpur.

== See also ==
- List of villages in Vaishali district
