= List of villages in Hajipur block =

This is a list of villages in Hajipur block, Vaishali district, Bihar state, India.

STCode	DTCode	SubdtCode	VillCode	Villname
10	18	011	0000	Hajipur
10	18	011	0001	Harauli Khurd
10	18	011	0002	Fatehpur Gaura
10	18	011	0003	Harauli Fatehpur Ehtamali
10	18	011	0004	Harauli Fatehpur
10	18	011	0005	Shaikhra Urf Shalkhwa
10	18	011	0006	Chak Shama
10	18	011	0007	Arazi Shahbazpur
10	18	011	0008	Chak Bhojmanjari Shabuddin
10	18	011	0009	Chak Shama
10	18	011	0010	Chak Shama Urf Kazi Chak
10	18	011	0011	Daulatpur Chandi
10	18	011	0012	Chak Mato Urf Chak Badiuzzama
10	18	011	0013	Chak Halim
10	18	011	0014	Chak Tula
10	18	011	0015	Chak Nur
10	18	011	0016	Anrra
10	18	011	0017	Bishunpur Patwa
10	18	011	0018	Phulhara Ishak
10	18	011	0019	Chak Dindayal Chak Rafik
10	18	011	0020	Chak Maruf
10	18	011	0021	Chak Ahmad
10	18	011	0022	Salemabad
10	18	011	0023	Shahzadpur Jitwar Chak
10	18	011	0024	Manua
10	18	011	0025	Manua Alah Baksh
10	18	011	0026	Manua Khalak Dad
10	18	011	0027	Shahzadpur Jitwar
10	18	011	0028	Manua
10	18	011	0029	Murgia Chak
10	18	011	0030	Shahbazpur Patwa
10	18	011	0031	Ismailpur
10	18	011	0032	Jazira Ismailpur
10	18	011	0033	Rampur Dumri
10	18	011	0034	Bakarpur
10	18	011	0035	Bakarpur
10	18	011	0036	Minapur Rae
10	18	011	0037	Rampur Dumri
10	18	011	0038	Chak Khudan
10	18	011	0039	Rampur Dumri
10	18	011	0040	Kutubpur Dumri
10	18	011	0041	Rae Dih
10	18	011	0042	Shiurampur
10	18	011	0043	Chak Hafiz Amanullah
10	18	011	0044	Chak Mahmudpur Ali Urf Hargobi
10	18	011	0045	Minapur Rae
10	18	011	0046	Chak Said Kari
10	18	011	0047	Chak Ataullah
10	18	011	0048	Asdharpur
10	18	011	0049	Chak Rabia Urf Rabia Chak
10	18	011	0050	Paharpur
10	18	011	0051	Ghauspur Ijra
10	18	011	0052	Latmara
10	18	011	0053	Rasulpur Bhoj Urf Adharpur
10	18	011	0054	Bedaulia
10	18	011	0055	Ghoswar
10	18	011	0056	Fatehpur Ekara Urf Moghlani
10	18	011	0057	Thathan Buzurg
10	18	011	0058	Kazipur Thathan
10	18	011	0059	Fatehpur Chiraimar
10	18	011	0060	Pahetia
10	18	011	0061	Salempur Kishundas
10	18	011	0062	Salempur Kishundas
10	18	011	0063	Nonpur
10	18	011	0064	Chak Bhatandi
10	18	011	0065	Bhatandi
10	18	011	0066	Malikpur PipraUrfPanapur Pipra
10	18	011	0067	Birra
10	18	011	0068	Mirnagar Arazi
10	18	011	0069	Afazalpur Dhobghati Saidpur
10	18	011	0070	Chak Murad
10	18	011	0071	Chak Murad
10	18	011	0072	Bazidpur
10	18	011	0073	Karimabad
10	18	011	0074	Chak Latif Urf Bahora Chak
10	18	011	0075	Salempur Tole Urf Kodar Katta
10	18	011	0076	Chak Rasul
10	18	011	0077	Berai Urf Panapur
10	18	011	0078	Senduari Gobind
10	18	011	0079	Paranpur Senduari Chak Hamida
10	18	011	0080	Sadullahpur PokhrairaUrfPatali
10	18	011	0081	Khurrampur
10	18	011	0082	Sadullahpur Pokhraria
10	18	011	0083	Sadullahpur Pokhraria Urf Fate
10	18	011	0084	Chak Chameli
10	18	011	0085	Ekara
10	18	011	0086	Kutubpur Ekara
10	18	011	0087	Chak Kutubpur Matwalia
10	18	011	0088	Gurmain
10	18	011	0089	Senduari Basdeo urf Chapta
10	18	011	0090	Sisauni Rajauli
10	18	011	0091	Mansingpur Rajauli
10	18	011	0092	Bishunpur Basant urf Suhai
10	18	011	0093	Chak Saidpur Rajauli
10	18	011	0094	Saidpur Rajauli
10	18	011	0095	Saidpur Rajauli urf ChakGhausa
10	18	011	0096	Majirabad Suhai
10	18	011	0097	Saidpur Jhirua
10	18	011	0098	Harpur Rajauli urf Hariharpur
10	18	011	0099	Hariharpur ShankarAzRakbe urf
10	18	011	0100	Pranpur Berai
10	18	011	0101	Daulatpur Deoria urf Daulatpur
10	18	011	0102	Jhirua Dih
10	18	011	0103	Jhirua Mal
10	18	011	0104	Sharifabad
10	18	011	0105	Dighi Kalan
10	18	011	0106	Kuari Khurd
10	18	011	0107	Chak Lala
10	18	011	0108	Ijrashamain urf Molna Chak
10	18	011	0109	Purwa
10	18	011	0110	Bishunpur Bala Dhari urf Balwa
10	18	011	0111	Jagdishpur
10	18	011	0112	Sair Chak
10	18	011	0113	Chak Faizullah
10	18	011	0114	Panapur Gobrahi
10	18	011	0115	Chak Sakra
10	18	011	0116	Chak Baladhari
10	18	011	0117	Chak Fatma
10	18	011	0118	Bisrampur Baladhari
10	18	011	0119	Chak Sultani
10	18	011	0120	Chak Chandaleh
10	18	011	0121	Chak Bhoj urf Sahabuddin
10	18	011	0122	Chandaleh
10	18	011	0123	Kuari Khurd
10	18	011	0124	Chak Nayamat
10	18	011	0125	Gadai Sarae
10	18	011	0126	Chaknur
10	18	011	0127	Moazampur
10	18	011	0128	Madarpur
10	18	011	0129	Khalaf Bag
10	18	011	0130	Chak Aima
10	18	011	0131	Akilabad
10	18	011	0132	Akilabad Diara
10	18	011	0133	Shampur Gandaki
10	18	011	0134	Salempur Gandaki
10	18	011	0135	Chak Bigha Jani
10	18	011	0136	Bagh Asdullah Arazi AzRakbe
10	18	011	0137	Adalpur
10	18	011	0138	Naurangabad
10	18	011	0139	Yusufpur Dighikhurd
10	18	011	0140	Chak Jalal
10	18	011	0141	Saifpur
10	18	011	0142	Jairam Chak
10	18	011	0143	Karanpur
10	18	011	0144	Chak Mahmud Chisti
10	18	011	0145	Sherpur
10	18	011	0146	Karanpur
10	18	011	0147	Sherpur
10	18	011	0148	Nawada Khurd
10	18	011	0149	Salempur
10	18	011	0150	Rampur Nawsahan
10	18	011	0151	Nawada Kalan
10	18	011	0152	Bahadurpur
10	18	011	0153	Sadullahpur satan
10	18	011	0154	saidpur Ganesh
10	18	011	0155	Saidpur Ganesh
10	18	011	0156	Mohanpur Ishar Chak Khusro
10	18	011	0157	Nawada Khurd
10	18	011	0158	Chandni Sadullahpur Satan
10	18	011	0159	Phul Chak
10	18	011	0160	Sadullahpur Satan
10	18	011	0161	Arazi Saidpur Ganesh
10	18	011	0162	SadullahpurSatanurfMujwar Chak
10	18	011	0163	Imadpur Sultan
10	18	011	0164	Arazi Sultanpur
10	18	011	0165	Mangurahi
10	18	011	0166	Musapur Suboch
10	18	011	0167	Rampur Nausahan
10	18	011	0168	Mohabatpur
10	18	011	0169	Jethui Nizamat
10	18	011	0170	Jethui Nizamat
10	18	011	0171	Ibrahimpur Bazid urfIbrahimpat
10	18	011	0172	Sultanpur
10	18	011	0173	Imadpur Sultan
10	18	011	0174	Halalpur Madarpur
10	18	011	0175	Bishunpur Basant urf Suhai
10	18	011	0176	Saidpur Parsuram urf Jagdispur
10	18	011	0177	Chak Saheb
10	18	011	0178	Bishunpur Rae urf Titra
10	18	011	0179	Chak Yeari
10	18	011	0180	Phulhara Banu
10	18	011	0181	Kansara
10	18	011	0182	Basauli
10	18	011	0183	Panapur Langa
10	18	011	0184	Chak Khunda urf Milki
10	18	011	0185	Panapur Loawan urf Biropur
10	18	011	0186	Nainha
10	18	011	0187	Arazi Nainha
10	18	011	0188	Chak Saidkhan
10	18	011	0189	Chak Khunda urf Milik Chak
10	18	011	0190	Bejha
10	18	011	0191	Loawan urf Loma
10	18	011	0192	Bishunpur Ram
10	18	011	0193	Sopha
10	18	011	0194	Gumti
10	18	011	0195	Az Rakbe Gumti
10	18	011	0196	Dayalpur Sapha
10	18	011	0197	Randaha
10	18	011	0198	Ahmadpur LakhnichakAulai
10	18	011	0199	Bishunpur Chak Lala urfBaranti
10	18	011	0200	Bishunpur Chak Lal urf Baranti
10	18	011	0201	Andharwara
10	18	011	0202	Azmatpur Damu
10	18	011	0203	Chak Mahi urf Andharwara Chauk
10	18	011	0204	Chakbarua urf Chakbarauna
10	18	011	0205	Bahuara
10	18	011	0206	Arazi Chak Basdeo
10	18	011	0207	Kashipur Chak Bibi
10	18	011	0208	Kila Larui
10	18	011	0209	Larui Husainabad
10	18	011	0210	Chak Akila
10	18	011	0211	Kuari Bazurg

== See also ==
- List of villages in Vaishali district
