= Baikuntha Shukla =

Indian revolutionary

Baikuntha Shukla (15 May 1907 – 14 May 1934) was an Indian nationalist and revolutionary. He was the nephew of Yogendra Shukla, one of the founders of Hindustan Socialist Republican Association (HSRA). He was hanged for murdering Phanindra Nath Ghosh who had become a government approver which led to hanging of Bhagat Singh, Sukhdev and Rajguru.

== Early life ==
Shukla was born on 15 May 1907 (the same day as that of another revolutionary, Sukhdev) in the village of Jalalpur in Muzaffarpur district of Bengal Presidency (now in Vaishali district of Bihar). He got his elementary education at his village and became a teacher in a lower primary school in village Mathurapur. He took active part in Civil Disobedience Movement in 1930 and was imprisoned in Patna Camp Jail. He was released along with other Satyagrahis after the Gandhi–Irwin Pact. Later, he came in contact with the members of the Hindustan Socialist Republican Association and became a revolutionary.

== Death ==
Phonindra Nath Ghosh, hitherto a key member of the Hindustan Socialist Republican Association had treacherously betrayed the cause by turning an approver, giving evidence, which led to the execution of Bhagat Singh, Sukhdev and Rajguru. Shukla was commissioned to plan the execution of Ghosh as an act of ideological vendetta which he carried out successfully on 9 November 1932. He was convicted of the killing and hanged in Gaya Central Jail on 14 May 1934. He was 27 years old.
