= People's Pond =

- Pond
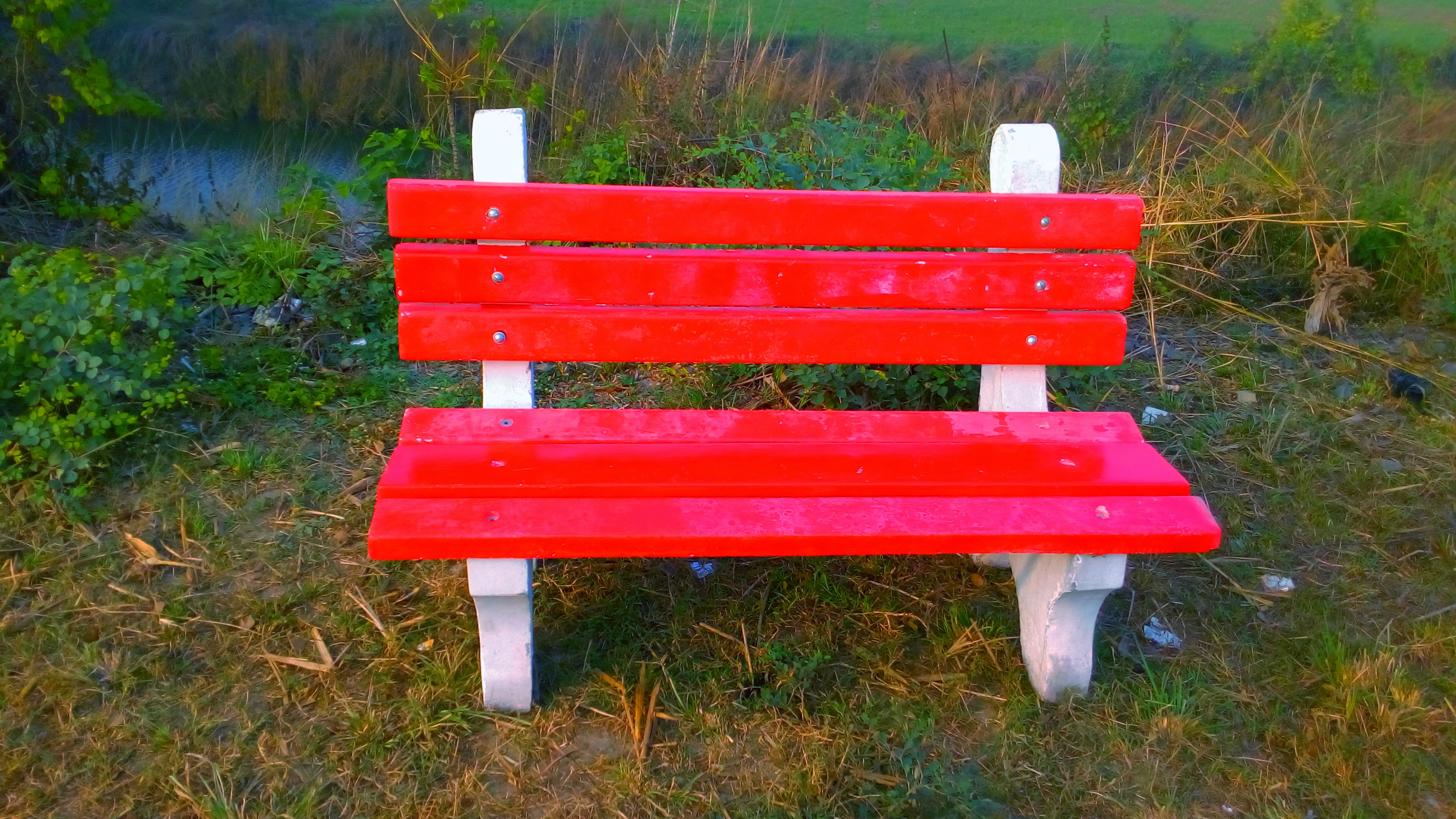
- this is a picture of near People's Pond

- Location in Bihar, India
- Coordinates: 25.8445°N 85.4526°E
- Country: India
- State: Bihar
- District: Vaishali District
- Block: Chehrakala
- Village: Mahammadpur Turi
- Time zone: UTC+5:30 (IST)
- PIN: 844122

People's Pond is a man-made pond feature in Mahammadpur Turi, Vaishali District, Bihar, India. At the present time flower and fruit trees are planted around it, which makes it beautiful.
