= List of villages in Bidupur block =

This is a list of villages in Bidupur block, Vaishali district, Bihar state, India.

STCode	DTCode	SubdtCode	VillCode	Villname
10	18	013	0000	Bidupur
10	18	013	0001	Mohanpur Ishar Chak Khusro
10	18	013	0002	Saidpur Ganesh
10	18	013	0003	Arazi Dharampur
10	18	013	0004	Arazi Kanchanpur
10	18	013	0005	Az Rakbe Chaklatif
10	18	013	0006	Chak Dharampur
10	18	013	0007	Panapur Daud
10	18	013	0008	Maheshwarpur Tajpur
10	18	013	0009	Bala Tanr
10	18	013	0010	Phulpura
10	18	013	0011	Shampur Urf Mansurpur
10	18	013	0012	Gurbiswa
10	18	013	0013	Chak Saleh Urf Chak Hamza
10	18	013	0014	Chak Sikandar
10	18	013	0015	Chak Uphraul
10	18	013	0016	Khajauta
10	18	013	0017	Mohanpur
10	18	013	0018	Kazipatti
10	18	013	0019	Raghopur Chaturang
10	18	013	0020	Arazi Shampur
10	18	013	0021	Chak Ibrahim
10	18	013	0022	Raghopur Chaturang
10	18	013	0023	Bishunpur Rajkhan
10	18	013	0024	Chak Mangar
10	18	013	0025	Sitalpur Kamalpur
10	18	013	0026	Bulan Sarae
10	18	013	0027	Kutubpur Motaluke Biddupur
10	18	013	0028	Dilawarpur Hemti
10	18	013	0029	Chak Masud
10	18	013	0030	Damaipatti
10	18	013	0031	Bishanpur Kakrahta
10	18	013	0032	Basantpur Kakrahta Urf Milki
10	18	013	0033	Uphraul
10	18	013	0034	Sadhullahpur Dhobauli
10	18	013	0035	Sitalpur Kakrahta
10	18	013	0036	Majhauli
10	18	013	0037	Mohiuddinpur
10	18	013	0038	Panapur Kusiari
10	18	013	0039	Chak Thakursi Urf Kusiari
10	18	013	0040	Alampur Kusiari
10	18	013	0041	Bishunpur Paltu
10	18	013	0042	Chak Lakhni
10	18	013	0043	Bishunpur Lala Chak Urf Lalua
10	18	013	0044	Lakhni
10	18	013	0045	Chandpur Chak Makrand
10	18	013	0046	Arazi Kanchanpur
10	18	013	0047	Arazi Chak Kanchanpur
10	18	013	0048	Harbanspur
10	18	013	0049	Imadpur Kapur Urf Mohim Chak
10	18	013	0050	Zakipur Urf Dharampur Motaluke
10	18	013	0051	Mohanpur Ishar
10	18	013	0052	Saidpur Ganesh
10	18	013	0053	Panapur Dharampur
10	18	013	0054	Panapur Dharmpur
10	18	013	0055	Kanchanpur
10	18	013	0056	Rahimapur
10	18	013	0057	Mohiuddinpur Sangram
10	18	013	0058	Chak Kashi
10	18	013	0059	Ismail Chak
10	18	013	0060	Bazidpur Malahi
10	18	013	0061	Arazi Bazidpur Malahi
10	18	013	0062	Chak Gangadhar
10	18	013	0063	Arazi Bhairopur
10	18	013	0064	Pakri
10	18	013	0065	Chak Mahbub
10	18	013	0066	Bhairopur
10	18	013	0067	Pakauli
10	18	013	0068	Rajasan
10	18	013	0069	Mohanpur Isar Chak Khusro
10	18	013	0070	Rahimapur
10	18	013	0071	Panapur Dharampur
10	18	013	0072	Panapur Dharampur
10	18	013	0073	Mayil
10	18	013	0074	Daudnagar Motaluke Damaipatti
10	18	013	0075	Khilwat
10	18	013	0076	Kamalpur Singhia
10	18	013	0077	Dilawarpur Hemti
10	18	013	0078	Dilawarpur Hemti
10	18	013	0079	Biddupur
10	18	013	0080	Ramdauli
10	18	013	0081	Amer
10	18	013	0082	Nawa Nagar
10	18	013	0083	Shampur Dayal
10	18	013	0084	Nawanagar
10	18	013	0085	Nawanagar
10	18	013	0086	Bibharpur
10	18	013	0087	Shampur Dayal Deo NarayanSing
10	18	013	0088	Madhurapur
10	18	013	0089	Sadullahpur Chak Farid
10	18	013	0090	Chak Sadaili Urf Darwa
10	18	013	0091	Bishunpur KishunDas Majlishpur
10	18	013	0092	Gobindpur
10	18	013	0093	Bishunpur Kishundas Urf Majlis
10	18	013	0094	Chak Khaje Ahmad
10	18	013	0095	Chak Shama
10	18	013	0096	Gopalpur Urf Sadullahpur
10	18	013	0097	Bishunpur Said Ali
10	18	013	0098	Gokhulpur
10	18	013	0099	Chak Mohammad
10	18	013	0100	Chak Sultan
10	18	013	0101	Chechar
10	18	013	0102	Bagh Said Khan
10	18	013	0103	Gopalpur Chaknai
10	18	013	0104	Gobindpur Gokhula
10	18	013	0105	Mathura Sultanpur Pachkatiya
10	18	013	0106	Dilawar Gobardhan
10	18	013	0107	Chandpur Saidabad
10	18	013	0108	Sultanpur Pachkatia
10	18	013	0109	Chak Bihari
10	18	013	0110	Sultanpur Pachkatia
10	18	013	0111	Khanpur Pakri
10	18	013	0112	Dhanauti
10	18	013	0113	Khajauti
10	18	013	0114	Dhanauti
10	18	013	0115	Tajpur Kharka
10	18	013	0116	Kalyanpur
10	18	013	0117	Chak Zainab
10	18	013	0118	Kaila Chak Dilawarpur Gobardha
10	18	013	0119	Panapur Sukhanand
10	18	013	0120	Kaithaulia
10	18	013	0121	Maniarpur
10	18	013	0122	Mustafapur
10	18	013	0123	Dharampur Ram Rae
10	18	013	0124	Panapur Kayam
10	18	013	0125	Kutubpur
10	18	013	0126	Hasan Chak
10	18	013	0127	Gobindpur
10	18	013	0128	Jurawanpur Gopalpur
10	18	013	0129	Bazidpur Saidat Majhlopur
10	18	013	0130	Kutubpur Khalsa
10	18	013	0131	Chandpur Shadab
10	18	013	0132	Suhai Ram Das
10	18	013	0133	Panapur Sirpal Motaluke Bhojpu

== See also ==
- List of villages in Vaishali district
