= List of villages in Patepur block =

This is a list of villages in Patepur block, Vaishali district, Bihar state, India.

STCode	DTCode	SubdtCode	VillCode	Villname
10	18	007	0000	Patepur
10	18	007	0001	Tajpurwa Urf Shaikhpura
10	18	007	0002	Shahbazpur Puraina Balbhadarpu
10	18	007	0003	Afazlpur Puraina
10	18	007	0004	Sat Kurwa
10	18	007	0005	Bharokhra Urf Bhagwanpur Kewal
10	18	007	0006	Sherpur Tal Narkatia
10	18	007	0007	Ganga Das Chak
10	18	007	0008	Khajanpura Urf Tajpur Khauzpur
10	18	007	0009	Chandpur Fateh
10	18	007	0010	Nawa Chak
10	18	007	0011	Mohamadpur Jumman
10	18	007	0012	Harpur Hari
10	18	007	0013	Chak Faiz
10	18	007	0014	Majhaulia
10	18	007	0015	Chak Bahora Urf Sherpur Bahora
10	18	007	0016	Shahpur Buzurg
10	18	007	0017	Maina Chhaprai
10	18	007	0018	Mohammadpur Suki
10	18	007	0019	Harlo Chanpur Suki
10	18	007	0020	Nasir Chak
10	18	007	0021	Teknari Urf Ganga Ram Chak
10	18	007	0022	Darhua
10	18	007	0023	Rampur
10	18	007	0024	Kasturi Sara Urf Chak Ebrahim
10	18	007	0025	Kutubpur
10	18	007	0026	Chak Said
10	18	007	0027	Maudah Chatur
10	18	007	0028	Maudah Buzurg
10	18	007	0029	Maudah Dih
10	18	007	0030	Lakhimpur
10	18	007	0031	Bishunpur Teknari Urf Ramauli
10	18	007	0032	Makundpur Urf Gangapur
10	18	007	0033	Saidpur Dumra
10	18	007	0034	Repura Urf Rampur Sikandar
10	18	007	0035	Chak Faizal Urf Milki
10	18	007	0036	Marai Dih
10	18	007	0037	Chak Ibrahim
10	18	007	0038	Shahbazpur
10	18	007	0039	Simarwara Durgapur
10	18	007	0040	Salempur Salkhani
10	18	007	0041	Guara Urf Gobindpur Debi
10	18	007	0042	Dabhaich
10	18	007	0043	Nilo Rukunpur
10	18	007	0044	Paranpur
10	18	007	0045	Tisiauta Dhrampur
10	18	007	0046	Pindrauta Khurd
10	18	007	0047	Saidpur
10	18	007	0048	Aswari
10	18	007	0049	Jagdishpur Khas
10	18	007	0050	Chak Abdul Wahid
10	18	007	0051	Chapta
10	18	007	0052	Subhankarpur Tikauli
10	18	007	0053	Padmaul
10	18	007	0054	Bishunpur Gobind
10	18	007	0055	Mahthi Dharamchand
10	18	007	0056	Mahthi Dharamchand
10	18	007	0057	Manpur
10	18	007	0058	Mataiya
10	18	007	0059	Chakaiya
10	18	007	0060	Bardiha Turki
10	18	007	0061	Raghopur Narsanda
10	18	007	0062	Dhankaul
10	18	007	0063	Ammna Mori
10	18	007	0064	Chak Rukunuddin Urf Niruddin
10	18	007	0065	Bazidpur Kusahi
10	18	007	0066	Bazidpur Kartar
10	18	007	0067	Chak Bairisal
10	18	007	0068	Mirpur
10	18	007	0069	Ababakarpur
10	18	007	0070	Rasulpur
10	18	007	0071	Emadpur
10	18	007	0072	Sultanpur Chak Harihar
10	18	007	0073	Patepur
10	18	007	0074	Bishunpur Kuahi Urf Bahlempur
10	18	007	0075	Khesrahi Urf Raghunathpur
10	18	007	0076	Lahladpur Urf Rasulpur Alehdad
10	18	007	0077	Hibibpur Urf Jaintpur
10	18	007	0078	Peyarepur
10	18	007	0079	Paharpur
10	18	007	0080	Ahmadpur Urf Hasanpur Majhauli
10	18	007	0081	Daskurwa
10	18	007	0082	Rupanpatti
10	18	007	0083	Bishunpur Katesar
10	18	007	0084	Bizepura
10	18	007	0085	Mustafapur Jaisinghpur
10	18	007	0086	Gobindpur Bhela
10	18	007	0087	Chakwa Urf Chak Khodaiya
10	18	007	0088	Bela Adam
10	18	007	0089	Bhusahi
10	18	007	0090	Larho
10	18	007	0091	Balgaon Chandpura Buzurg
10	18	007	0092	Bharthipur
10	18	007	0093	Ghanipur
10	18	007	0094	Agrail Khurd
10	18	007	0095	Bishunpur Jainarayan Urf Cham.
10	18	007	0096	Husepur
10	18	007	0097	Chak Jado
10	18	007	0098	Hasan Sarae
10	18	007	0099	Belasandhan
10	18	007	0100	Bela Dargah Urf Bela Buzurg
10	18	007	0101	Kawa Dih
10	18	007	0102	Bishunpur Kawa
10	18	007	0103	Rasulpur Kawa
10	18	007	0104	Bahauddinpur
10	18	007	0105	Bahadurpur Chaknauta
10	18	007	0106	Digha Fatehpur
10	18	007	0107	Chak Sharifa Bhatu Rae
10	18	007	0108	Chak Abdul Kadir
10	18	007	0109	Alinagar Urf Lothan
10	18	007	0110	Chak Fatma Abdur Rahim
10	18	007	0111	Chak Dohri
10	18	007	0112	Akhtiarpur Doghra
10	18	007	0113	Balnathpur Kodaria
10	18	007	0114	Kishunwara
10	18	007	0115	Bahuara
10	18	007	0116	Chak Mir Baki
10	18	007	0117	Khajepur Basti
10	18	007	0118	Chak Abdul Islam
10	18	007	0119	Bhagwanpur Khajuri
10	18	007	0120	Malpur Urf Dilawarpur
10	18	007	0121	Pokhra
10	18	007	0122	Bishunpur Kaiju
10	18	007	0123	Chak Rusulabad
10	18	007	0124	Bhagwanpur Kaiju
10	18	007	0125	Lohani Patti
10	18	007	0126	Bhagwanpur Urf Nurpur
10	18	007	0127	Bazidpur Kaiju
10	18	007	0128	Bakarh
10	18	007	0129	Saidpura
10	18	007	0130	Raghopur Asidhai
10	18	007	0131	Nirpur Bagh
10	18	007	0132	Murtazapur Dumri
10	18	007	0133	Aswan
10	18	007	0134	Sakrauli
10	18	007	0135	Azizpur Chandi
10	18	007	0136	Banchar
10	18	007	0137	Marai
10	18	007	0138	Bora Buzurg
10	18	007	0139	Kapsara
10	18	007	0140	Thema
10	18	007	0141	Amthanwa
10	18	007	0142	Kawai Baraila
10	18	007	0143	Jhil Baraila

== See also ==
- List of villages in Vaishali district
