= Narharpur, Bihar =

Narharpur
- village
- Location in Bihar, India Narharpur (India)
- Coordinates: 25.7439313°N 85.4161324°E
- Country: India
- State: Bihar
- District: Vaishali

Area
  - Total: 5.8 km^{2} (2.2 sq mi)
- Elevation: 52 m (171 ft)

Population (December 2010)
  - Total: 6,500
  - Density: 1,120/km^{2} (2,900/sq mi)

Languages
  - Official: Bajjika, Hindi
- Time zone: UTC+5:30 (IST)
- PIN: 844122
- Telephone code: 91-6227 XXX XXX
- ISO 3166 code: IN-BR
- Nearest city: Patna
- Sex ratio: 1.005 Male/Female ♂/♀
- HDI: ▲0.574
- Literacy: 74%
- Lok Sabha constituency: Hajipur
- Vidhan Sabha constituency: Mahanar
- Climate: Typical Indian climate (Köppen)

Narharpur is a village of Vaishali district in the Bihar state of India. It belongs to Tirhut Division. It is about 35 km from headquarters Hajipur. It is located in the Jandaha block of the District. It comes under the Mahanar constitution in State Assembly & Hajipur Parliamentary in Lok Sabha. Brahm Sthan Kalisthan is a holy place and located in middle in this village

== Geography ==
Narharpur is located at 25.68°N 85.22°E.

== Transport ==
It is well connected to Mahua (8 km) and Desari (7 km) via roadways. Many express trains stop at the nearest Desari railway station.

Nearest national highway is Hajipur-Jandaha-Samastipur NH-322 about 6km from the village meeting it at Gazipur Chowk

== Education ==
The education level is relatively high as per the Indian village standard.

- Middle School Narharpur: Facilities provide education up to 8th standard. It is furnished with a playground. The school has had a good track record in quality education for many years.
- High School Narharpur Mukundpur: Facilities provide education up to 10th standard. At one time students from 32 villages came to this school for their schooling. Today, alumni from this school are working in different parts of the country with leading multi-national corporations.

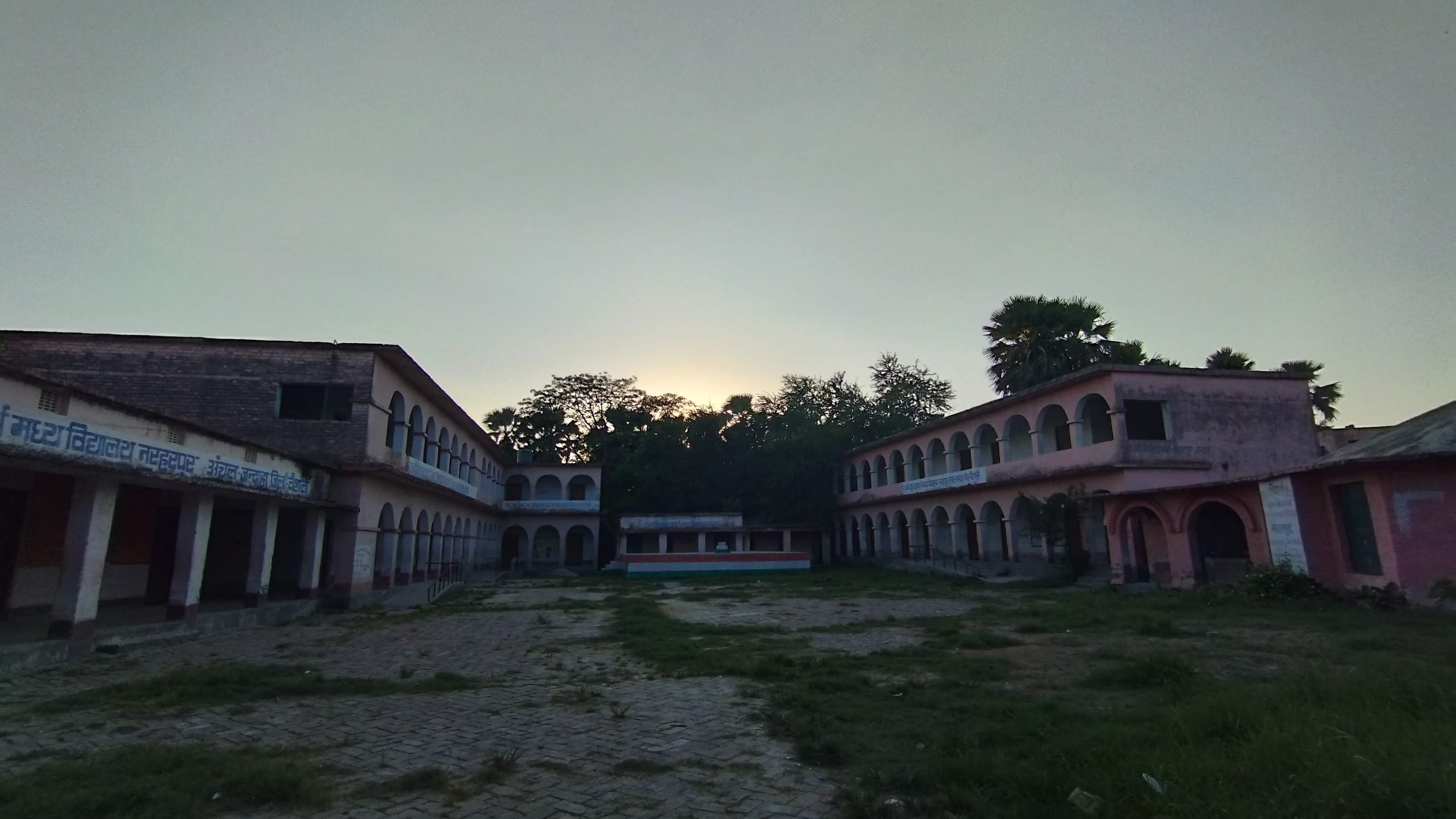
Narharpur High School Main

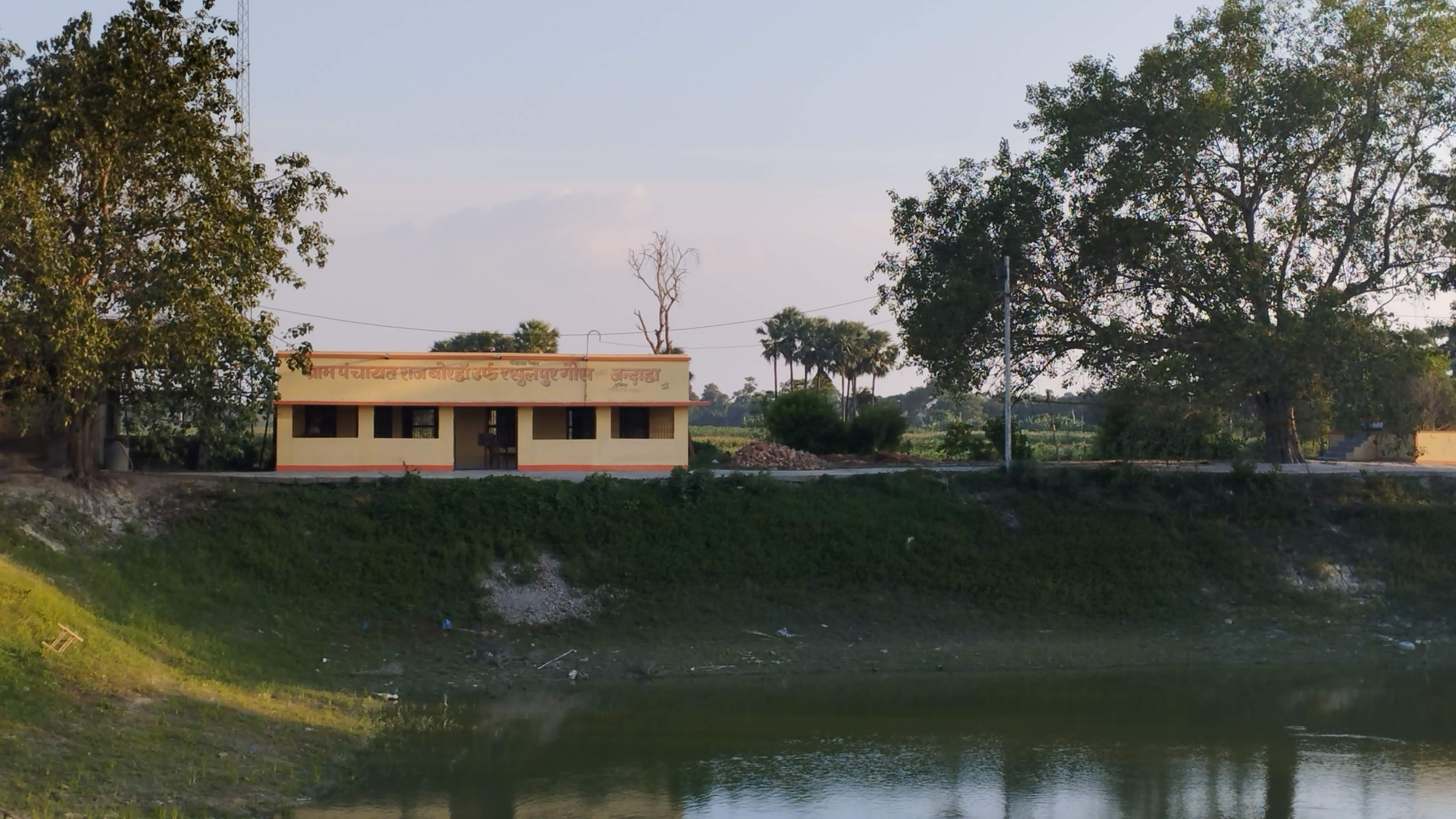
Narharpur Village Panchayat

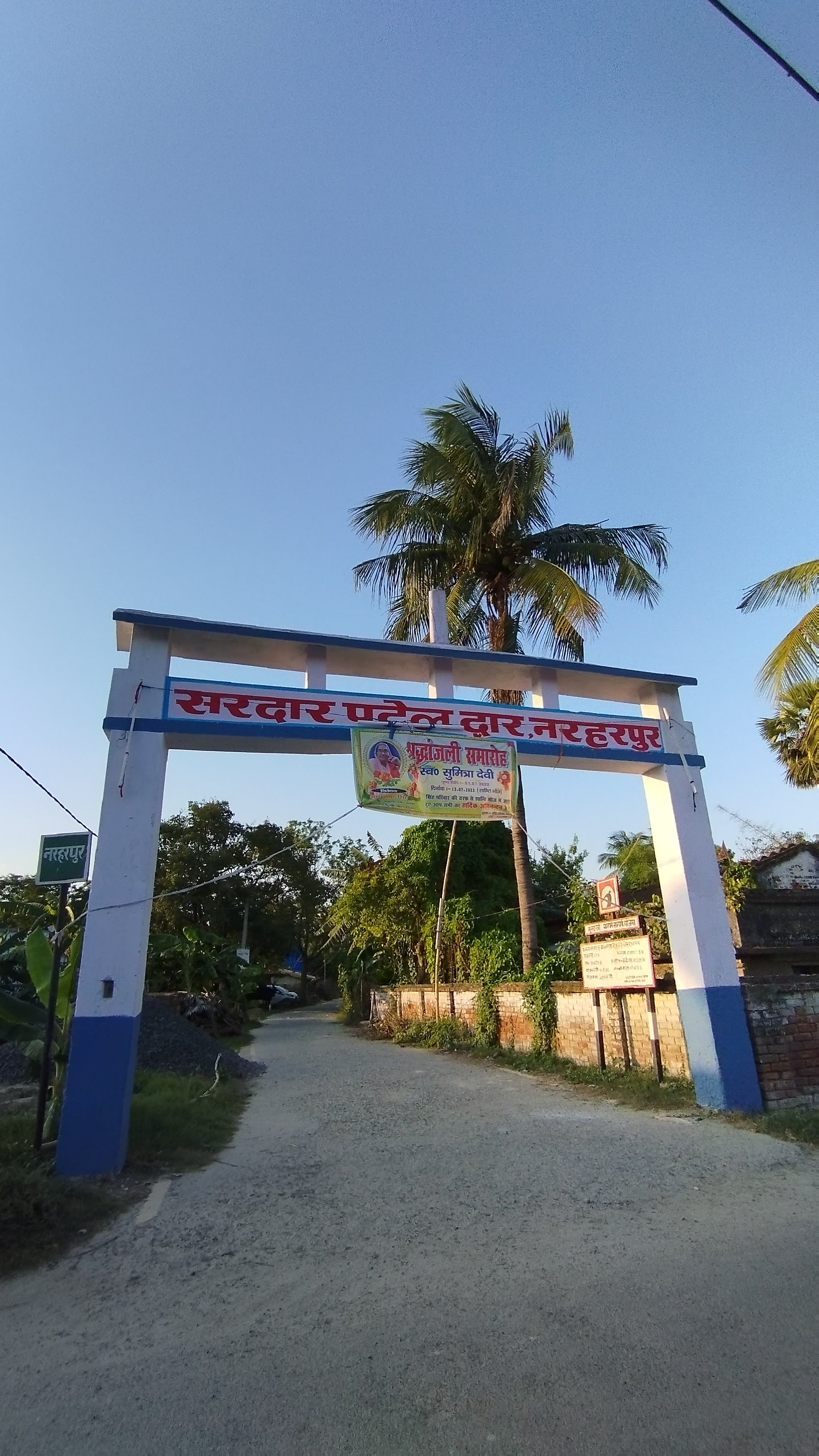
Sardar Patel Gate, Narharpur, Bihar

== Expressway Projects ==
Amas–Darbhanga Expressway is crossing from Narharpur. The 60m six lanes access controlled greenfield expressway is under construction right now. It is crossing from south-west to north-east direction.

Patna–Purnea Expressway is also crossing from Narharpur. The 90m six lanes access controlled greenfield expressway is under land acquisition state right now. It is crossing from west to east direction.

== Religion ==
Hinduism is the dominant religion in this area.

== See also ==
- List of villages in Vaishali district
