= List of villages in Chehrakala block =

This is a list of villages in Chehrakala block, Vaishali district, Bihar state, India.

| STCode | DTCode | SubdtCode | VillCode | Villname |
|---|---|---|---|---|
| 10 | 18 | 006 | 0000 | Chehra Kala |
| 10 | 18 | 006 | 0001 | Bishunpur Anrra |
| 10 | 18 | 006 | 0002 | Harpur Anrra |
| 10 | 18 | 006 | 0003 | Hedayatpur Katahra Dakhali |
| 10 | 18 | 006 | 0004 | Asadpur Malbhara |
| 10 | 18 | 006 | 0005 | Bathna Mahodat |
| 10 | 18 | 006 | 0006 | Chehra Kalan Urf Mohammadpur |
| 10 | 18 | 006 | 0007 | Karhatia Buzurg |
| 10 | 18 | 006 | 0008 | Kamalpura Urf Rasulpur Patti |
| 10 | 18 | 006 | 0009 | Mansurpur Halayia |
| 10 | 18 | 006 | 0010 | Chak Hanif Dullah |
| 10 | 18 | 006 | 0011 | Mustafapur Halayia |
| 10 | 18 | 006 | 0012 | Shaikhpura |
| 10 | 18 | 006 | 0013 | Chak Suleman |
| 10 | 18 | 006 | 0014 | Ababakarpur |
| 10 | 18 | 006 | 0015 | Chal Aulia |
| 10 | 18 | 006 | 0016 | Chapait |
| 10 | 18 | 006 | 0017 | Sherpur Jalal |
| 10 | 18 | 006 | 0018 | Saraya Urf Rasulpur Habib |
| 10 | 18 | 006 | 0019 | Sarae Afzal |
| 10 | 18 | 006 | 0020 | Mathna Mal Urf Mohammadpur |
| 10 | 18 | 006 | 0021 | Mathna Malik Urf Mathna Bhim |
| 10 | 18 | 006 | 0022 | Begham Patti |
| 10 | 18 | 006 | 0023 | Chhapra Khajechand |
| 10 | 18 | 006 | 0024 | Chak Mandi Urf Chak Moinuddin |
| 10 | 18 | 006 | 0025 | Akhtiarpur Sihan |
| 10 | 18 | 006 | 0026 | Chak Chuhar |
| 10 | 18 | 006 | 0027 | Chainpur |
| 10 | 18 | 006 | 0028 | Shahpur Khurd |
| 10 | 18 | 006 | 0029 | Jalalpur Birbhan |
| 10 | 18 | 006 | 0030 | Mohammadpur Gangti |
| 10 | 18 | 006 | 0031 | Babbalpur Chhaurahi |
| 10 | 18 | 006 | 0032 | Budhu Chak Urf Chak Budhu |
| 10 | 18 | 006 | 0033 | Bhorha Urf Muzaffarpur Murad |
| 10 | 18 | 006 | 0034 | Rampur Dumri |
| 10 | 18 | 006 | 0035 | Kaila Kalyan |
| 10 | 18 | 006 | 0036 | Salempur Dumaria |
| 10 | 18 | 006 | 0037 | Rasulpur Fateh |
| 10 | 18 | 006 | 0038 | Mahammadpur Turi |
| 10 | 18 | 006 | 0039 | Hedayatpur Haji Chak |
| 10 | 18 | 006 | 0040 | Bishunpur Garh |
| 10 | 18 | 006 | 0041 | Bakhri Sultan |
| 10 | 18 | 006 | 0042 | Bakhri Dua |
| 10 | 18 | 006 | 0043 | Alipur Sumerganj Urf Ghauspur |
| 10 | 18 | 006 | 0044 | Chak Salempur Dumaria |
| 10 | 18 | 006 | 0045 | Kishunpur Telaur |
| 10 | 18 | 006 | 0046 | Rasulpur Fateh Hayat Urf Kaili |
| 10 | 18 | 006 | 0047 | Kaila Jalalpur Urf Jalalpur |
| 10 | 18 | 006 | 0048 | Khurampur |
| 10 | 18 | 006 | 0049 | Rasulpur Daud |
| 10 | 18 | 006 | 0050 | Basti |
| 10 | 18 | 006 | 0051 | Chhaurahi |
| 10 | 18 | 006 | 0052 | Tal Sihan |
| 10 | 18 | 006 | 0053 | Shahjalal Chak |

== See also ==
- List of villages in Vaishali district
