= Mahua, Bihar =

Community development block in Vaishali district, Bihar, India

Mahua Mahua singh rai
- Community Development Block
- Mahua
- Location in Bihar, India
- Coordinates: 25°48′44.0″N 85°23′48.0″E
- Country: India
- State: Bihar
- Region: Mithila
- District: vaishali
- District Sub-division: Mahua
- Anchal: Mahua
- Vidhan Sabha constituency: Mahua

Government
  - Type: Community development block

Population (2001)
  - Total: 218,344

Languages
  - Official: Hindi
- Time zone: UTC+5:30 (IST)
- ISO 3166 code: IN-BR

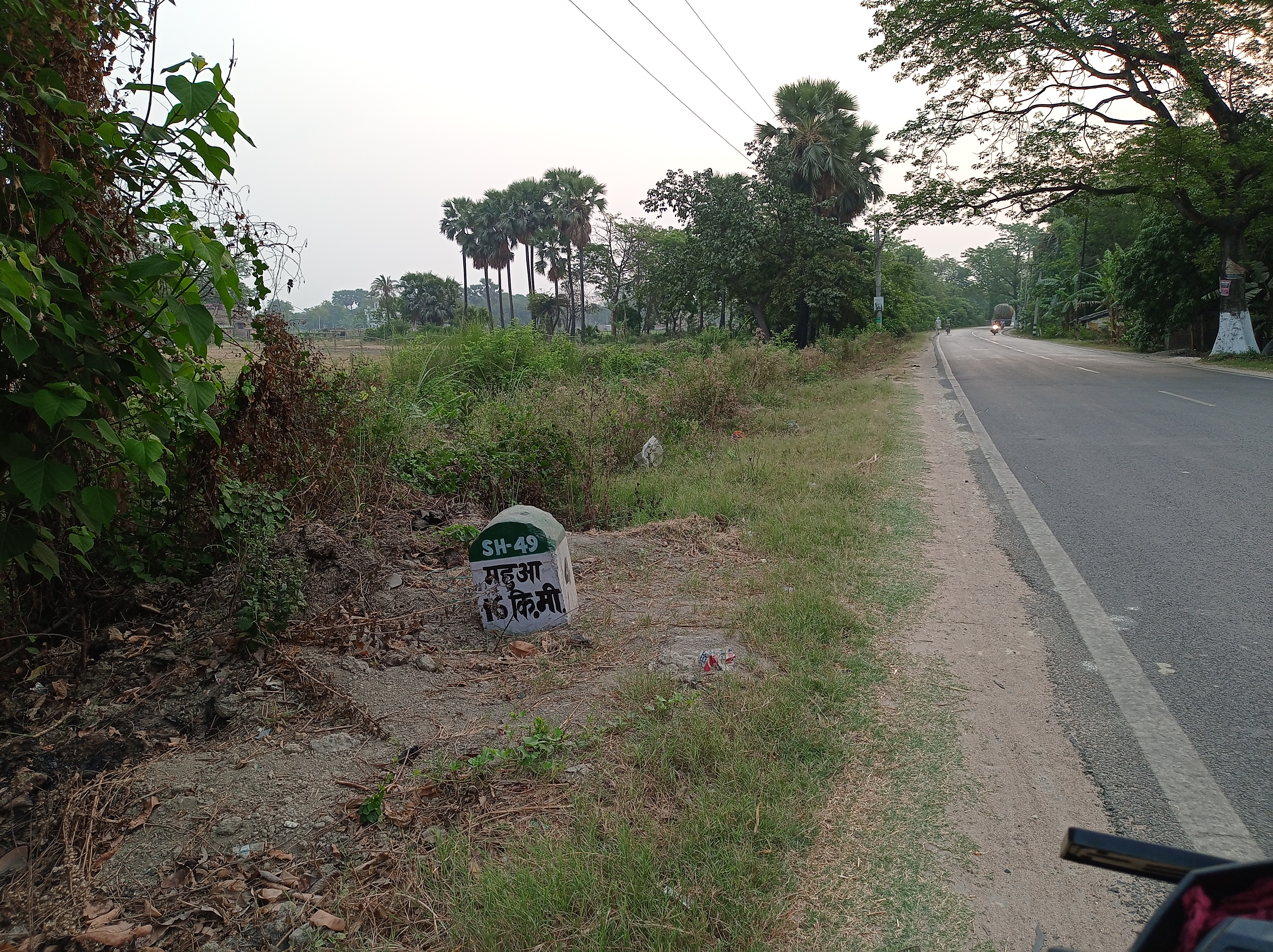
The Mahua-Patna route.

Mahua is a block and sub-division in Vaishali district, it is a small town between Hajipur to Muzaffarpur, Mahua is also a constituent assembly under Bihar Legislative Assembly. It comes under Hajipur Lok Sabha (Lower house of Indian Parliament) constituency

== Population and communities ==
- Male Population : 113240 (2009 ist.)
- female Population : 105104
- Total Population : 218344
- SC Total Population : 48231
- ST Total Population : 3
- Minority Total Population : 23924
- Population Density : 1559
- Sex Ratio : 928

== Gallery ==
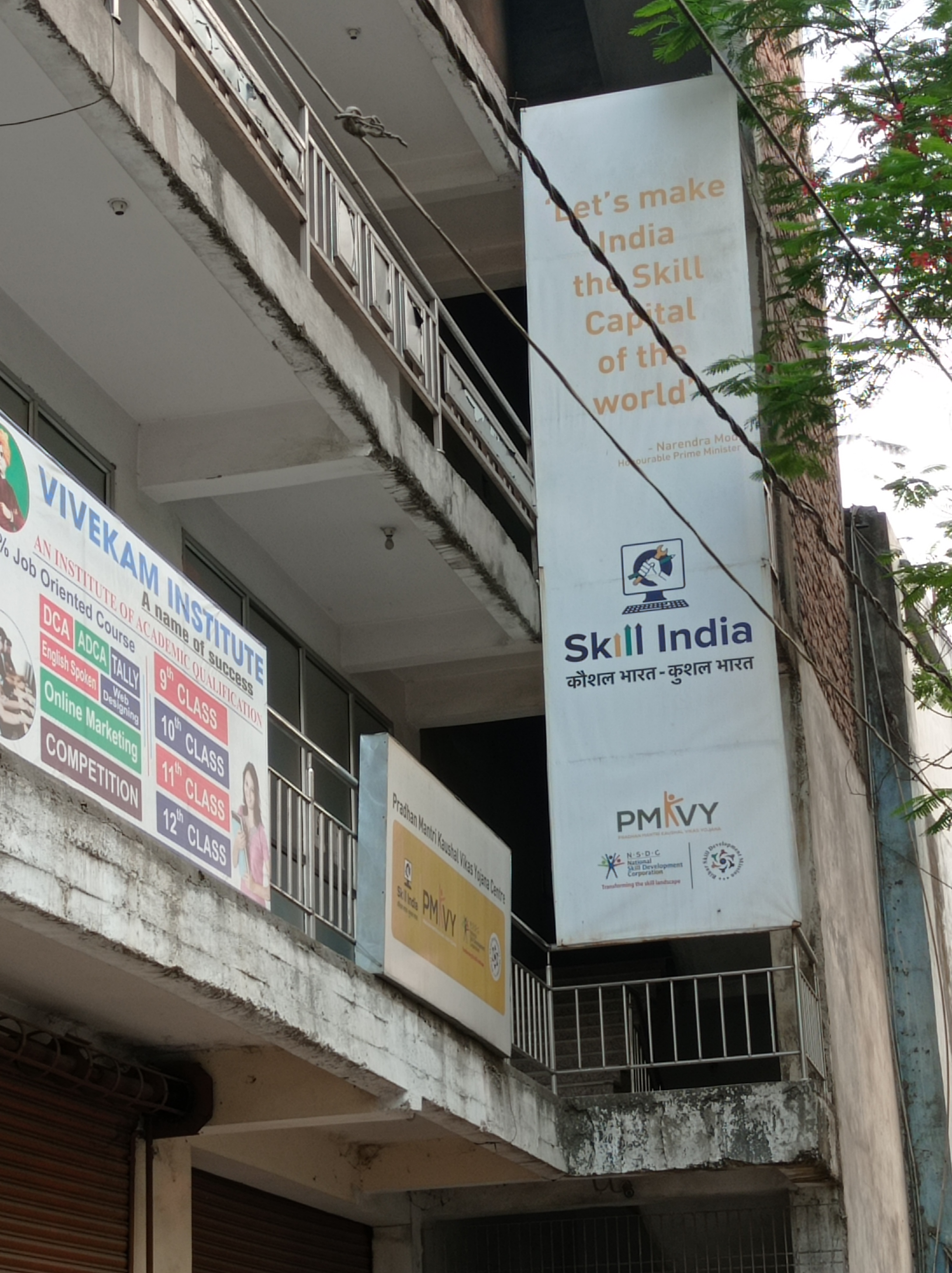
A skill development centre near Mahua, established as a part of Pradhanmantri Kaushal Vikas Yojna.

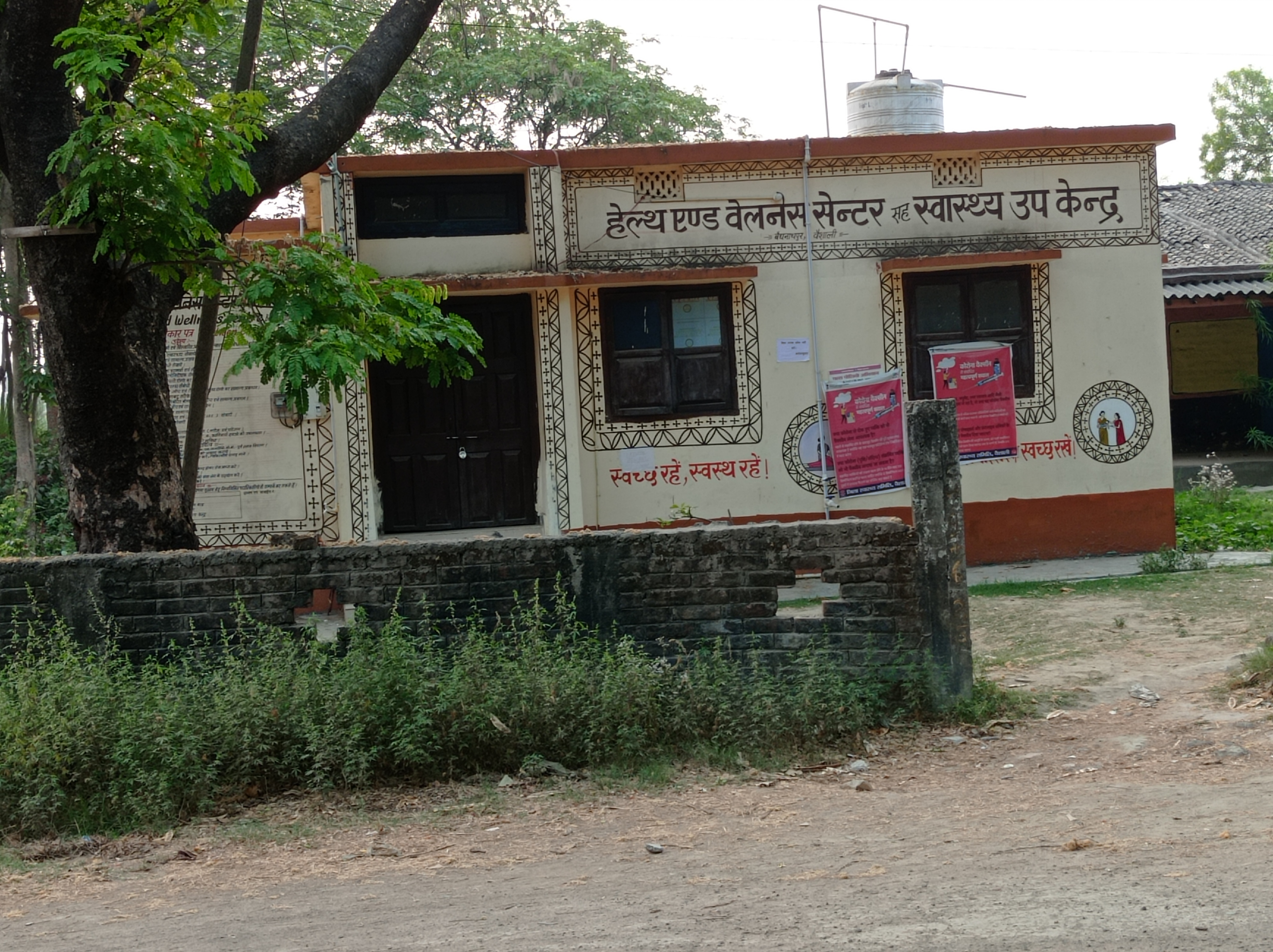
A health and wellness centre near Mahua.

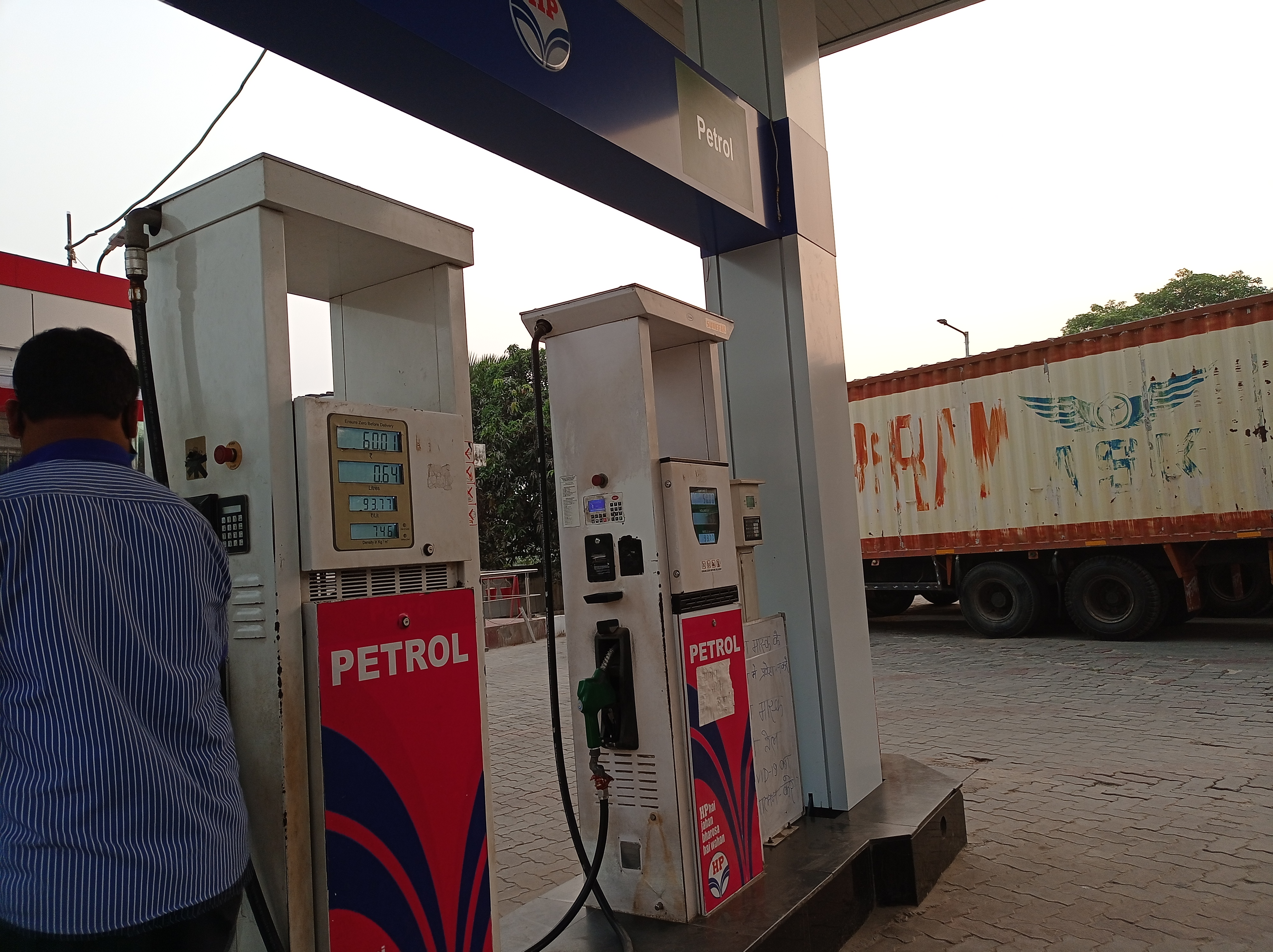
A petrol pump located in the Hajipur-Mahua road.

== See also ==
- List of villages in Mahua block
