= List of villages in Jandaha block =

This is a list of villages in Jandaha block, Vaishali district, Bihar state, India.

STCode	DTCode	SubdtCode	VillCode	Villname
10	18	009	0000	Dih Buchauli Urf Bazidpur Buchauli
10	18	009	0001	Mahiuddinpur Garahi
10	18	009	0002	Kamalpur
10	18	009	0003	Makundpur Garahi Tola Hadhudp.
10	18	009	0004	Mahiuddinpur Garahi
10	18	009	0005	Chakhadhudpur
10	18	009	0006	Bilandpur Dhudhua
10	18	009	0007	Bahsi Damodar
10	18	009	0008	Bahsi Saidpur
10	18	009	0009	Tal Salha
10	18	009	0010	Rampur Bhorhan
10	18	009	0011	Chamrupur
10	18	009	0012	Rampur Bhorhan
10	18	009	0013	Chamrupur
10	18	009	0014	Bhorha Urf Rasulpur Ghaus
10	18	009	0015	Rampur Bhorhan
10	18	009	0016	Akhtiarpur
10	18	009	0017	Jalalpur
10	18	009	0018	Nasratpur
10	18	009	0019	Chak Bairo
10	18	009	0020	Malkauli
10	18	009	0021	Chausiwan Urf Akhtiarpur
10	18	009	0022	Narharpur Urf Bishunpur Sarae
10	18	009	0023	Makundpur Gopinath
10	18	009	0024	Kadirpur Urf Jagdishpur
10	18	009	0025	Basantpur Urf Mohiuddinpur
10	18	009	0026	Dhudhua Urf Bishunpur Ragho
10	18	009	0027	Mathurapur
10	18	009	0028	Makundpur Garahi
10	18	009	0029	Chak Bajo Malahi
10	18	009	0030	Malahi
10	18	009	0031	Bhagwanpur Mataluke Makundpur
10	18	009	0032	Bazidpur Khurd
10	18	009	0033	Bazidpur Malahi
10	18	009	0034	Panapur Tol
10	18	009	0035	Tal Rahmat
10	18	009	0036	Kajri Khurd
10	18	009	0037	Kajri Buzurg
10	18	009	0038	Chak Fateh
10	18	009	0039	Mukundpur Bhath
10	18	009	0040	Bishunpur Silothar
10	18	009	0041	Bazidpur Madhaul
10	18	009	0042	Kumhra Garh
10	18	009	0043	Madhopur
10	18	009	0044	Tal Murgara
10	18	009	0045	Tal Chatra
10	18	009	0046	Chak Abdul Ghani
10	18	009	0047	Khopi Chilki
10	18	009	0048	Chak Said Mir
10	18	009	0049	Chak Abdul Wahid
10	18	009	0050	Hasanpur Buzurg
10	18	009	0051	Chak Abdul Ghani Urf Muslim
10	18	009	0052	Singahi
10	18	009	0053	Talyehia
10	18	009	0054	Rangreza
10	18	009	0055	Kaddutanr
10	18	009	0056	Rampur Ramhar
10	18	009	0057	Lachhmipur Barah Batta
10	18	009	0058	Kathwalia Urf Bhagwatpur
10	18	009	0059	Adalpur Urf Adilnagar
10	18	009	0060	Singhara Buzurg
10	18	009	0061	Lachhumanpur Barah Batta
10	18	009	0062	Sonarthi Urf Mustafapur Sonar.
10	18	009	0063	Gangapur Luchhmi Urf Narikalan
10	18	009	0064	Nari Khurd
10	18	009	0065	Shamaspura
10	18	009	0066	Khizirpur Jasparha
10	18	009	0067	Bishunpur Jasparha
10	18	009	0068	Khemkaranpur
10	18	009	0069	Sastaul Urf Siswan
10	18	009	0070	Chak Ajaeb
10	18	009	0071	Muradabad
10	18	009	0072	Milki Urf Chak Wake Khizirpur
10	18	009	0073	Gopalpur Urf Harlochanpur
10	18	009	0074	Misraulia
10	18	009	0075	Bhathahi
10	18	009	0076	Bhatandipur
10	18	009	0077	Chak Isa
10	18	009	0078	Chak Larhe
10	18	009	0079	Bishunpur Bedaulia
10	18	009	0080	Silothar
10	18	009	0081	Chak Khurdi Urf Chak Fakharud.
10	18	009	0082	Said Mohammadpur
10	18	009	0083	Chak Ibrahim
10	18	009	0084	Panapur Silothar
10	18	009	0085	Kalapahar
10	18	009	0086	Chak Mahiuddin
10	18	009	0087	Rampur Chak Lala
10	18	009	0088	Chak Faridabad
10	18	009	0089	Rasulpur Purkhotim
10	18	009	0090	Rohua Urf Balgobindpur
10	18	009	0091	Mansinghpur Bijhrauli
10	18	009	0092	Loma (Jandaha)
10	18	009	0093	Pirapur
10	18	009	0094	Dulwar
10	18	009	0095	Jandaha
10	18	009	0096	Buchauli Sakrauli
10	18	009	0097	Jagdishpur Urf Makundpur
10	18	009	0098	Hirpur
10	18	009	0099	Saraia Urf Pirapur
10	18	009	0100	Chak Nasir
10	18	009	0101	Jhammanganj
10	18	009	0102	Sarae Shaikh Alam
10	18	009	0103	Hazrat Jandaha
10	18	009	0104	Arnia
10	18	009	0105	Chand Sarae
10	18	009	0106	Jagdishpur Sahas
10	18	009	0107	Kharakpur Urf Bishunpur Chak
10	18	009	0108	Marai
10	18	009	0109	Bishunpatti
10	18	009	0110	Madhopur
10	18	009	0111	Mahisanrh
10	18	009	0112	Saidpur Dhanghota
10	18	009	0113	Gobindpur
10	18	009	0114	Ghauspur
10	18	009	0115	Chak Farida
10	18	009	0116	Chak Makai Urf Manka Chak
10	18	009	0117	Jagnandanpur Urf Jadunandanpur
10	18	009	0118	Mahpura
10	18	009	0119	Murtazapur Makund
10	18	009	0120	Chak Milki Urf Chak San Rukun
10	18	009	0121	Chak Shahwali
10	18	009	0122	Chak Ahsan
10	18	009	0123	Harparsad Bishunpur Khem
10	18	009	0124	Paurah Urf Porarh

== See also ==
- List of villages in Vaishali district
