= List of villages in Desri block =

This is a list of villages in Desri block, Vaishali district, Bihar state, India.

STCode	DTCode	SubdtCode	VillCode
10	18	014	0000
10	18	014	0001
10	18	014	0002
10	18	014	0003
10	18	014	0004
10	18	014	0005
10	18	014	0006
10	18	014	0007
10	18	014	0008
10	18	014	0009
10	18	014	0010
10	18	014	0011
10	18	014	0012
10	18	014	0013
10	18	014	0014
10	18	014	0015
10	18	014	0016
10	18	014	0017
10	18	014	0018
10	18	014	0019
10	18	014	0020
10	18	014	0021
10	18	014	0022
10	18	014	0023
10	18	014	0024
10	18	014	0025
10	18	014	0026
10	18	014	0027
10	18	014	0028
10	18	014	0029
10	18	014	0030
10	18	014	0031
10	18	014	0032
10	18	014	0033
10	18	014	0034
10	18	014	0035
10	18	014	0036
10	18	014	0037
10	18	014	0038
10	18	014	0039
10	18	014	0040
10	18	014	0041
10	18	014	0042
10	18	014	0043

== See also ==
- List of villages in Vaishali district
