= Chakjamal =

- Village
- Location in the state of Bihar, India Chakjamal (India)
- Coordinates: 25°39′36″N 85°26′43″E
- Country: India
- State: Bihar
- District: Vaishali

Area
  - Total: 5 km^{2} (1.9 sq mi)

Population (December 2010)
  - Total: 3,500
  - Density: 700/km^{2} (1,800/sq mi)

Language
  - Official Language: Hindi
  - Regional Language: Vajjika
- Time zone: UTC+5:30 (IST)
- PIN: 844509
- Telephone code: +91-6229
- ISO 3166 code: IN-BR
- Nearest city: Hajipur and Patna
- Sex ratio: 1.02Male/Female ♂/♀
- HDI: ▲0.574
- Literacy: 74%
- Lok Sabha constituency: Hajipur
- Vidhan Sabha constituency: Raja Pakar
- Climate: Typical Indian climate

ChakJamal village is located in Sahdai Buzurg block of Vaishali district in Bihar, India. It is situated 1 km away from sub-district headquarter Sahdai Buzurg and 25 km away from district headquarter Hajipur. As per 2009 stats, ChakJamal village is also a gram panchayat.

== People ==
Agriculture is the main employment of this village. Yet the village requires Industrial development to develop. Poor road quality and education are the main concern of this village. Medical and health services are being slowly improved.

== History ==
The village has a long history. The main history is about the rivalry of Brahmins and Rajputs. There are 5 houses in the village consisting of Brahmins which is in minority whereas the Rajputs are in majority. The rivalry is going on for 11-12 decades and hasn't stopped yet. Many murders, attacks, robbery, banditry have taken place. While the "Jha" are always wanting peace, The Rajputs have always attacked first and capture land illegally. But when attacked the Brahmins are there to defend both legally and physically. Lots and lots of fake Fir's are filed for this. The history is very old of this village specially the ancient temples.

== Geography ==
According to Census 2011 information the location code or village code of Chak Jamal village is 236045. The total geographical area of village is 167 hectares. ChakJamal has a total population of 3,430 peoples. There are about 667 houses in ChakJamal village. Hajipur is nearest town to ChakJamal which is approximately 25 km away.

== Transport ==
By Train
Nearest Railway Station- Sahadei Buzurg about 1 km away.
Public/Private Bus
Available in radius of 1 km.

== Education ==
Government Middle School, ChakJamal for the study of class 1 to 8th.

== See also ==
- List of villages in Vaishali district
