= List of villages in Raghopur block =

This is a list of villages in Raghopur block, Vaishali district, Bihar state, India.

STCode	DTCode	SubdtCode	VillCode	Villname
10	18	012	0000	Raghopur
10	18	012	0001	Terahrasia
10	18	012	0002	Chaunkia
10	18	012	0003	Sorabpur urf Saraepur
10	18	012	0004	Ashpatpur Singhia urf Latiahi
10	18	012	0005	sukwarpur
10	18	012	0006	Jafrabad Dih
10	18	012	0007	Himatpur Diara
10	18	012	0008	Gobardhanpur
10	18	012	0009	Jamalpur Chak ShankerGanga Pra
10	18	012	0010	JafrabadTok-araziBeshiNaoBarar
10	18	012	0011	Saifabad
10	18	012	0012	Saidpur Hulas
10	18	012	0013	Saidpur Deochand
10	18	012	0014	Parsotimpur Barari
10	18	012	0015	Parsotimpur
10	18	012	0016	Jahangirpur Pirthi
10	18	012	0017	AshpatpurSinghia urf Bariarpur
10	18	012	0018	Chak Thakru
10	18	012	0019	Saidpur Singhia
10	18	012	0020	Paroha
10	18	012	0021	Karmupur
10	18	012	0022	Ramdauli Barari
10	18	012	0023	Jahangirpur Phuli
10	18	012	0024	Gorari
10	18	012	0025	Etwarpur
10	18	012	0026	Mirampur Alakh Deori
10	18	012	0027	Bishunpur Maniari
10	18	012	0028	Shiuprasad Motaluke Gobindpur
10	18	012	0029	Mirzapur Lachhu
10	18	012	0030	Rampur Shamchand
10	18	012	0031	Mohanpur
10	18	012	0032	Malikpur
10	18	012	0033	Saidabad
10	18	012	0034	Rustampur
10	18	012	0035	Jethuli
10	18	012	0036	Wahidpur
10	18	012	0037	Bahrampur
10	18	012	0038	Bahrampur
10	18	012	0039	Pirmohammadpur
10	18	012	0040	Parsotimpur
10	18	012	0041	Raghopur
10	18	012	0042	Mokrampur
10	18	012	0043	Bhawani Prasad urf Madho
10	18	012	0044	Shaistapur
10	18	012	0045	Ibrahimabad
10	18	012	0046	Jagdishpur Idrakarai Barari
10	18	012	0047	Chandpur Idark
10	18	012	0048	Sirirampur
10	18	012	0049	Nagargawan
10	18	012	0050	Haibatpur Barari
10	18	012	0051	Haibatpur Karari
10	18	012	0052	Fatehpur Shahbaz
10	18	012	0053	Paharpur
10	18	012	0054	Chak Singar Karari
10	18	012	0055	Hajpurwa
10	18	012	0056	Chak Singar Barari
10	18	012	0057	Chak Khetal
10	18	012	0058	Chak Basant
10	18	012	0059	Panapur Pakauli
10	18	012	0060	Chak Basant
10	18	012	0061	Birpur
10	18	012	0062	Dwarkapur
10	18	012	0063	Chak Chand
10	18	012	0064	Maheshpur
10	18	012	0065	Chak Narayan
10	18	012	0066	Rampur Karari Barari
10	18	012	0067	Ismailpur
10	18	012	0068	Chak Mahabal
10	18	012	0069	Juramanpur Barari
10	18	012	0070	Juramanpur Karari
10	18	012	0071	Juramanpur Taufir

== See also ==
- List of villages in Vaishali district
