= List of villages in Goraul block =

This is a list of villages in Goraul block, Vaishali district, Bihar state, India.

STCode	DTCode	SubdtCode	VillCode	Villname
10	18	005	0000	Goraul
10	18	005	0001	Bhataulia
10	18	005	0002	Chainpur Bhataulia
10	18	005	0003	Enayat Nagar Rasulpur
10	18	005	0004	Bhikhanpura
10	18	005	0005	Chakia Urf Chak Akhtiar
10	18	005	0006	Beyas Chak
10	18	005	0007	Beyas Chak
10	18	005	0008	Makhdumpur Urf Tal Berai
10	18	005	0009	Mustafapur Harsher
10	18	005	0010	Chainpur
10	18	005	0011	Mohammadpur Daria
10	18	005	0012	Islampur
10	18	005	0013	Chainpur Bhataulia
10	18	005	0014	Katar Mala
10	18	005	0015	Sher Beg
10	18	005	0016	Sadullahpur
10	18	005	0017	Adampur
10	18	005	0018	Rampur Bakhtaur
10	18	005	0019	Bahadurpur
10	18	005	0020	Bakhtaurganj
10	18	005	0021	Lodipur
10	18	005	0022	Bahadurpur Barahkurwa
10	18	005	0023	Khajaul Bazidpur
10	18	005	0024	Malikpur
10	18	005	0025	Lachhmi Naryanpur
10	18	005	0026	Rajkhand
10	18	005	0027	Dhane Goraul
10	18	005	0028	Narayanpur Bedaulia
10	18	005	0029	Goraul Bhagwanpur
10	18	005	0030	Mohanpur Asli
10	18	005	0031	Manpura
10	18	005	0032	Bhualpur Urf Bahadurpur
10	18	005	0033	Bhanpur Barewa
10	18	005	0034	Dharampur Sewakram
10	18	005	0035	Rampur Maniram Urf Chandpur
10	18	005	0036	Sondho Ratti
10	18	005	0037	Ramdaspur Sundarpur Dina
10	18	005	0038	Sandhodullah
10	18	005	0039	Tal Berai
10	18	005	0040	Rasulpur Hussain Dakhali
10	18	005	0041	Majirabad
10	18	005	0042	Madhurapur
10	18	005	0043	Mohammadpur Pojha
10	18	005	0044	Rasulpur Enayat Urf Babhantoli
10	18	005	0045	Pirapur Methura
10	18	005	0046	Benipatti
10	18	005	0047	Belwar
10	18	005	0048	Rahsa Doew
10	18	005	0049	Rasulapur Turki
10	18	005	0050	Rasul Chak
10	18	005	0051	Muniampur ChausiwanUrfSarangi
10	18	005	0052	Bishunpur Bendi
10	18	005	0053	Chhitrauli Mahesh
10	18	005	0054	Piroi Urf Rasulpur Shamshuddin
10	18	005	0055	Sarmastpur Jhitkahi
10	18	005	0056	Rasulpur Neyamat
10	18	005	0057	Rasulpur Koirgawan
10	18	005	0058	Rampur Sarotar
10	18	005	0059	Fatehpur Urf Shaikhpur Salema
10	18	005	0060	Shahpur Ghaus Urf Majhia
10	18	005	0061	Shahpur Ghaus Urf Majhia
10	18	005	0062	Ismailpur
10	18	005	0063	Paighambarpur
10	18	005	0064	Chehra khurd Urf Rasulpur Hadi
10	18	005	0065	Sarmastpur Jhitkahi Shamil
10	18	005	0066	Chak Arzani
10	18	005	0067	Baksawan
10	18	005	0068	Mohammadpur Shaikhpura
10	18	005	0069	Mohammadpur Gangti
10	18	005	0070	Hasanpur Gangti
10	18	005	0071	Rasulpur Gangti
10	18	005	0072	Kutubpur Shahmal
10	18	005	0073	Kanhauli Bishunpur Parsi
10	18	005	0074	Kanhauli Dhanraj
10	18	005	0075	Mirza Sadullah Urf Khatri Chak
10	18	005	0076	Said Kanhauli Chak
10	18	005	0077	Manpur
10	18	005	0078	Mahadeo Math
10	18	005	0079	Fatehpur Ram Mataluke B. P.
10	18	005	0080	Bishunpur
10	18	005	0081	Fatehpur Chauthai
10	18	005	0082	Panapur
10	18	005	0083	Rampur Rajdhari
10	18	005	0084	Chak Sultan
10	18	005	0085	Sihpur Kanhauli
10	18	005	0086	Kalyanpur
10	18	005	0087	Bishunpur Bejha

== See also ==
- List of villages in Vaishali district
