= List of villages in Bhagwanpur block =

This is a list of villages in Bhagwanpur block, Vaishali district, Bihar state, India.

STCode	DTCode	SubdtCode	VillCode	Villname
10	18	004	0000	Bhagwanpur
10	18	004	0001	Sadhopur Jiwan
10	18	004	0002	Chak Sarupan
10	18	004	0003	Chak Sarupan
10	18	004	0004	Asadpur Saidpura
10	18	004	0005	Hussaina Buzurg
10	18	004	0006	Hussaina Buzurg
10	18	004	0007	Fatehullah Chak
10	18	004	0008	Hussaina Khurd
10	18	004	0009	Karhari
10	18	004	0010	Rahsa Pachhiari
10	18	004	0011	Bihari
10	18	004	0012	Asoi Lacchiram
10	18	004	0013	Bishunpur Garjaul Urf Kutubpur
10	18	004	0014	Mohammadpur BandiUrfMurgiachak
10	18	004	0015	Bishunpur Parsi
10	18	004	0016	Maksudanpur urf Patti Motaluka
10	18	004	0017	Dohji Ram Chandar
10	18	004	0018	Askaranpur
10	18	004	0019	Madhopur Mahodat
10	18	004	0020	Alimuddinpur Chak
10	18	004	0021	Asoi Ragho
10	18	004	0022	Shambhupur Kauri
10	18	004	0023	Memrezpur
10	18	004	0024	Kaila Mohan
10	18	004	0025	Jalalpur Dallu
10	18	004	0026	Madhupur Ram
10	18	004	0027	Bishunpur Chintaman
10	18	004	0028	Manikpur Sehan
10	18	004	0029	Bishunpur Andu
10	18	004	0030	Patrahi
10	18	004	0031	Darweshpur Anjani
10	18	004	0032	Kazipur Dujai
10	18	004	0033	Shambhupatti
10	18	004	0034	Manganpur
10	18	004	0035	Siwan Kalyan
10	18	004	0036	Bakhra Khurd
10	18	004	0037	Partap Tanr
10	18	004	0038	Sahtha
10	18	004	0039	Kali Tanr
10	18	004	0040	Ghataro Battis Kurwa
10	18	004	0041	Wafapur Banthu
10	18	004	0042	Harbanspur Banthu
10	18	004	0043	Wafapur Banthu
10	18	004	0044	Harpur Kasturi
10	18	004	0045	Barah Rup
10	18	004	0046	Khir Kawan
10	18	004	0047	Godhiya Chaman
10	18	004	0048	Warishpur Patti
10	18	004	0049	Yukub Chak
10	18	004	0050	Asadpur Saidpur
10	18	004	0051	Warispur Patti
10	18	004	0052	Warispur Mal
10	18	004	0053	Asadpur Sadpur
10	18	004	0054	Rampur Gosain Das
10	18	004	0055	Mohamadpur Hari
10	18	004	0056	Bhagwanpur
10	18	004	0057	Rasulpur Sohawan
10	18	004	0058	Bahlolpur
10	18	004	0059	Saidpur Bijuli
10	18	004	0060	Ratanpura
10	18	004	0061	Bhatauli Anrudh
10	18	004	0062	Rampur Asurar
10	18	004	0063	Kiratpur Raja Ram
10	18	004	0064	Shekhpur Derhia
10	18	004	0065	Rasulpur Patti
10	18	004	0066	Patti Bandhu Rae
10	18	004	0067	Hansi Kewal
10	18	004	0068	Simra Khurd
10	18	004	0069	Jankipur
10	18	004	0070	Simra Buzurg
10	18	004	0071	Sarwan Amar
10	18	004	0072	Shekhpatti
10	18	004	0073	Mohamadpur Rohua
10	18	004	0074	Rohua Shahmian
10	18	004	0075	Faizpura
10	18	004	0076	Chakar Nama
10	18	004	0077	Salempur
10	18	004	0078	Ahirpur
10	18	004	0079	Yusufpur
10	18	004	0080	Panapur
10	18	004	0081	Mozaffarpur Malahi
10	18	004	0082	Mian Bairo
10	18	004	0083	Shampur
10	18	004	0084	Raghunathpur Imadpur
10	18	004	0085	Akhtiarpur Patera
10	18	004	0086	Bhagwatpur Patera
10	18	004	0087	Parbodhi Sisauni
10	18	004	0088	Enayetpur Parbodhi
10	18	004	0089	Chak Roshan
10	18	004	0090	Paterha
10	18	004	0091	Saidpur Paterha
10	18	004	0092	Jahangirpur Paterha
10	18	004	0093	Jahangirpur Basant
10	18	004	0094	Matiara Tok
10	18	004	0095	Bhagwatpur Paterha
10	18	004	0096	Majhauli Mohammadpur Buzurg
10	18	004	0097	Maricha Ram
10	18	004	0098	Mohamadabad
10	18	004	0099	Mansurapur
10	18	004	0100	Majhauli Mohamadpur Buzurg
10	18	004	0101	Malahi Akbar
10	18	004	0102	Matiara
10	18	004	0103	Telia Sarae
10	18	004	0104	Shembhupur
10	18	004	0105	Piru Malahi

== See also ==
- List of villages in Vaishali district
