= List of villages in Vaishali block =

This is a list of villages in Vaishali Block, Vaishali district, Bihar state, India.

| STCode | DTCode | SubdtCode | VillCode | Villname |
|---|---|---|---|---|
| 10 | 18 | 001 | 0000 | Vaishali |
| 10 | 18 | 001 | 0001 | ChakPitamber |
| 10 | 18 | 001 | 0002 | Simra |
| 10 | 18 | 001 | 0003 | Phular |
| 10 | 18 | 001 | 0004 | Mansurpur |
| 10 | 18 | 001 | 0005 | Chakna Maruf Chak Nathua |
| 10 | 18 | 001 | 0006 | Chak Mansur |
| 10 | 18 | 001 | 0007 | Kutubpur Bangri |
| 10 | 18 | 001 | 0008 | Makhdum purshekh |
| 10 | 18 | 001 | 0009 | Husainpur UrfJaharnathpurBhela |
| 10 | 18 | 001 | 0010 | Makhdumpur |
| 10 | 18 | 001 | 0011 | Chak Alahbad |
| 10 | 18 | 001 | 0012 | Alahbadpur |
| 10 | 18 | 001 | 0013 | Bariarpur |
| 10 | 18 | 001 | 0014 | Salempur |
| 10 | 18 | 001 | 0015 | Abdullahpur |
| 10 | 18 | 001 | 0016 | Abdullahpur |
| 10 | 18 | 001 | 0017 | Rampur Milki |
| 10 | 18 | 001 | 0018 | Rukunpur Urt Gobindpur |
| 10 | 18 | 001 | 0019 | Rukunpur |
| 10 | 18 | 001 | 0020 | Madhopur |
| 10 | 18 | 001 | 0021 | Bhagwanpur |
| 10 | 18 | 001 | 0022 | Bardahia |
| 10 | 18 | 001 | 0023 | Parsurampur Urf Sekhpura |
| 10 | 18 | 001 | 0024 | Jafraha |
| 10 | 18 | 001 | 0025 | Hasanpur |
| 10 | 18 | 001 | 0026 | Dumduma Juzwi Arazi |
| 10 | 18 | 001 | 0027 | Dumduma |
| 10 | 18 | 001 | 0028 | Almanpur |
| 10 | 18 | 001 | 0029 | Chak Rasul |
| 10 | 18 | 001 | 0030 | Alahdadpur |
| 10 | 18 | 001 | 0031 | Chak Ruhela |
| 10 | 18 | 001 | 0032 | Narayanpur |
| 10 | 18 | 001 | 0033 | Ibrahimpur |
| 10 | 18 | 001 | 0034 | Habibulla Chak |
| 10 | 18 | 001 | 0035 | Daudnagar |
| 10 | 18 | 001 | 0036 | Nandlalpur |
| 10 | 18 | 001 | 0037 | Habibpur |
| 10 | 18 | 001 | 0038 | Arthauli |
| 10 | 18 | 001 | 0039 | Musud Chak Nawada |
| 10 | 18 | 001 | 0040 | Chak Shakur |
| 10 | 18 | 001 | 0041 | Mohamadpur Manoradh |
| 10 | 18 | 001 | 0042 | Parmanandpur |
| 10 | 18 | 001 | 0043 | Basarh |
| 10 | 18 | 001 | 0044 | Chak Ramdas |
| 10 | 18 | 001 | 0045 | Harpur Basant |
| 10 | 18 | 001 | 0046 | Basra urf Chak Ramdat |
| 10 | 18 | 001 | 0047 | Benipur |
| 10 | 18 | 001 | 0048 | Jhansi Chhapra |
| 10 | 18 | 001 | 0049 | Kamman Chhapra |
| 10 | 18 | 001 | 0050 | Rohna |
| 10 | 18 | 001 | 0051 | Fatehpur |
| 10 | 18 | 001 | 0052 | Chakia Urf Chak Abdul Karim |
| 10 | 18 | 001 | 0053 | Bhagwatpur |
| 10 | 18 | 001 | 0054 | Jatkauli |
| 10 | 18 | 001 | 0055 | Dharampur |
| 10 | 18 | 001 | 0056 | Chintamanpur |
| 10 | 18 | 001 | 0057 | Madarna Urf Gopinathpur |
| 10 | 18 | 001 | 0058 | Manikpur Urf Hulaspur |
| 10 | 18 | 001 | 0059 | Sohai |
| 10 | 18 | 001 | 0060 | Rahimpur |
| 10 | 18 | 001 | 0061 | Mobarkpur |
| 10 | 18 | 001 | 0062 | Khajauta |
| 10 | 18 | 001 | 0063 | Khargaulia |
| 10 | 18 | 001 | 0064 | Manpura |
| 10 | 18 | 001 | 0065 | khijirpur |
| 10 | 18 | 001 | 0066 | Barkurwa |
| 10 | 18 | 001 | 0067 | Keshopur |
| 10 | 18 | 001 | 0068 | Munimchak |
| 10 | 18 | 001 | 0069 | Shahjahanpur |
| 10 | 18 | 001 | 0070 | Kishunpura |
| 10 | 18 | 001 | 0071 | RaghunathPattiUrfRamnathpatti |
| 10 | 18 | 001 | 0072 | Madhopur Kutubpur Chak Farid |
| 10 | 18 | 001 | 0073 | Hamidpur |
| 10 | 18 | 001 | 0074 | Rampur Jurawan |
| 10 | 18 | 001 | 0075 | Mohammadpur |
| 10 | 18 | 001 | 0076 | Raepura |
| 10 | 18 | 001 | 0077 | Mohiuddinpur |
| 10 | 18 | 001 | 0078 | Daria Chak |
| 10 | 18 | 001 | 0079 | Abhua |
| 10 | 18 | 001 | 0080 | Chak Daria Janubi Urf Daria |
| 10 | 18 | 001 | 0081 | Parmanandpur |
| 10 | 18 | 001 | 0082 | Paharpur |
| 10 | 18 | 001 | 0083 | Kamtauliaurf Harpur Gopi |
| 10 | 18 | 001 | 0084 | Rasul Chak |
| 10 | 18 | 001 | 0085 | Raghupur Urf Husainpur Ragho |
| 10 | 18 | 001 | 0086 | Chak Enayat |
| 10 | 18 | 001 | 0087 | Prasidh Nagar |
| 10 | 18 | 001 | 0088 | Baijnathpur |
| 10 | 18 | 001 | 0089 | Husaina Ragho |
| 10 | 18 | 001 | 0090 | Amritpur |
| 10 | 18 | 001 | 0091 | Bailka |
| 10 | 18 | 001 | 0092 | Pachpaika |
| 10 | 18 | 001 | 0093 | Harpur Naugir Urf Mahamadpur |
| 10 | 18 | 001 | 0094 | Abul Hasanpur |
| 10 | 18 | 001 | 0095 | Chak Kutubpur |
| 10 | 18 | 001 | 0096 | Chak Habib |
| 10 | 18 | 001 | 0097 | Gopalpur |
| 10 | 18 | 001 | 0098 | Chakjohari Urf Jhiktala |
| 10 | 18 | 001 | 0099 | Bakhri Chak |
| 10 | 18 | 001 | 0100 | Madhopur Ram |
| 10 | 18 | 001 | 0101 | Madhopur Ram |
| 10 | 18 | 001 | 0102 | Mataia Urf Saidpur Mathai |
| 10 | 18 | 001 | 0103 | Bishunpur Patty |
| 10 | 18 | 001 | 0104 | Bishunpur Chak Urf Bishunpur |
| 10 | 18 | 001 | 0105 | Rampur Horil |
| 10 | 18 | 001 | 0106 | Jhiktahia Urf Bishunpur Patti |
| 10 | 18 | 001 | 0107 | Chaturbhujpur |
| 10 | 18 | 001 | 0108 | Haharo Urf Chaturbhujpur |
| 10 | 18 | 001 | 0109 | Chak Daulat |
| 10 | 18 | 001 | 0110 | Shampur |
| 10 | 18 | 001 | 0111 | Hauzpur Urf Khauazpura |
| 10 | 18 | 001 | 0112 | Jaganpura |
| 10 | 18 | 001 | 0113 | Chak Moinuddin Urf Chak Munni |
| 10 | 18 | 001 | 0114 | Barhatia |
| 10 | 18 | 001 | 0115 | Tayab Chak |
| 10 | 18 | 001 | 0116 | Majhauli |
| 10 | 18 | 001 | 0117 | Chak Rohmat Urf Chak Tahir |

== See also ==
- List of villages in Vaishali district
