= Peerapur =

Village in Bihar, India

Peerapur Pirapur
- Village in India
- Peerapur
- Country: India
- State: Bihar
- District: Vaishali
- Anchal: Jandaha
- Vidhan Sabha constituency: Mahnar Vidhan Sabha

Government
  - Type: Gram Panchayat
  - Body: Panchayati raj

Population (2011)
  - Total: 5,539
- Demonym: Maithil

Language
  - Official: Hindi
  - Additional official: Maithili
- Time zone: UTC+5:30 (IST)
- Pincode: 844505

Peerapur or Pirapur is a village in the Jandaha block of Vaishali district in the state of Bihar, India. It is in Tirhut division. It is located more than 31 km from the nearest city of Hajipur and 44 km from the capital Patna. The local language is Maithili.

== Demographics ==
As per the 2011 census, Peerapur has a total population of 5,539 people, with 1,095 households. This village has higher literacy rate compared to Bihar. In 2011, literacy rate of Peerapur village was 73.96% compared to 61.80% of Bihar. In the village Male literacy stands at 80.14% while female literacy rate was 67.19%.

== Administration ==
Peerapur is a Gram panchayat. in the administrative region of Jandaha Block.

== Geography ==
The village of Peerapur is located between the Barela Bird Sanctuary and Arnia village. The Barela Bird Sanctuary is located in the north direction and similarly the Arnia village is located in the south direction from the village of Peerapur.
