= Arnia (village) =

Village in Bihar

Coordinates: 25°42′34″N 85°33′19″E

Arniya अरनिया
- Village
- Arnia
- Interactive map of Arniya
- Country: India
- State: Bihar
- Region: Mithila region
- Division: Tirhut division
- District: Vaishali district
- Block: Jandaha

Population (2011)
  - Total: 10,379
- Demonym: Maithil

Language
  - Official: Hindi

Local Language
  - Mother Language: Maithili language

Arnia (Maithili: अरनिया) also written as Arniya is a village in the Jandaha block of the Vaishali district in the Mithila region of the Bihar state in India. It is connected by the National Highway 322 with the other part of the country. The local language of the village is Maithili. Hindi is the official language. The total population of the village is 10379.

In the village of Arnia, the people celebrate Vidyapati Jayanti with a great pomp. Vidyapati was a great Maithili poet. The Vidyapati Jayanti refers to the celebration of the birth anniversary of the poet Vidyapati. The Chhath Puja is a major festival celebrated in the village and its surroundings.

== Geography ==
The village of Arnia is situated on the Gangetic plains. The bank of the Ganga river is only 15 kilometres in the south direction from the village. Peerapur is the neighbour village in the north direction of the Arnia village. There is a pond for Chhath Puja Ghat in the panchayat of Arnia, whose half part belongs to the panchayat of Peerapur.
