= List of villages in Mahua block =

This is a list of villages in Mahua block, Vaishali district, Bihar state, India.

STCode	DTCode	SubdtCode	VillCode	Villname
10	18	008	0000	Mahua
10	18	008	0001	Hafiz Chak
10	18	008	0002	Fatedullah Chak
10	18	008	0003	Bishunpur Mohan Urf Morangi
10	18	008	0004	Mohammadpur Narangi
10	18	008	0005	Narangi Sarsikan
10	18	008	0006	Hakimpur
10	18	008	0007	Sherpur Peyare
10	18	008	0008	Phular
10	18	008	0009	Mohammadpur Narangi Urf Ababakarpur
10	18	008	0010	Jalalpur Gangti
10	18	008	0011	Paharpur
10	18	008	0012	Sarwanpatti Mohammad Chand
10	18	008	0013	Lachhimipur Urf Digha
10	18	008	0014	Rasulpur Sadullah Jhirwara
10	18	008	0015	Mansurpur Mircha
10	18	008	0016	Mircha Maruf
10	18	008	0017	Dayalpur
10	18	008	0018	Madhopur Nijwan
10	18	008	0019	Bishunpur Taraura
10	18	008	0020	Bhagwatpur Taraura
10	18	008	0021	Sarwan
10	18	008	0022	Magurahi
10	18	008	0023	Bazidpur Madhaul
10	18	008	0024	Nur Mohammadpur Chak
10	18	008	0025	Mahua Ram Rae
10	18	008	0026	Mahua Singh Rae
10	18	008	0027	Gopal Chak
10	18	008	0028	Tilak Chak
10	18	008	0029	Bishunpur Madhaul
10	18	008	0030	rasulpur Mohiuddin Urf Madhaul
10	18	008	0031	Fatehpur Pakri
10	18	008	0032	Gajraul
10	18	008	0033	Biran Chak
10	18	008	0034	Bishunpur Hira Ram Urf Paharp.
10	18	008	0035	Chand Sarae
10	18	008	0036	Sadullah Chak
10	18	008	0037	Gorgawan Garh Gosain Das
10	18	008	0038	Chaturangpur Korhan
10	18	008	0039	Phulwaria
10	18	008	0040	Parsaunia
10	18	008	0041	Hasanpur Osti
10	18	008	0042	Rasulpur Osti
10	18	008	0043	Paharpur
10	18	008	0044	Daudpur Karamchand
10	18	008	0045	Madhopur Chak Nayamat
10	18	008	0046	Tajpur Buzurg
10	18	008	0047	Hasanpur Bhadwas
10	18	008	0048	Bazidpur Bhadwas
10	18	008	0049	Hasanpur Bhadwas
10	18	008	0050	Bhadwas
10	18	008	0051	Tajpur Raj Urf Bahora
10	18	008	0052	Karihan
10	18	008	0053	Mirza Nagar
10	18	008	0054	Harpur Otsi
10	18	008	0055	Chak Dadan
10	18	008	0056	Ghauspur Chak Majahid
10	18	008	0057	Chak Kaji Nizam
10	18	008	0058	Hedayatpur
10	18	008	0059	Kasba Mahua Urf Makundpur Chak
10	18	008	0060	Sadabpur Mahua
10	18	008	0061	Mohammadpur Beral Urf Shankar
10	18	008	0062	Suratpur
10	18	008	0063	Kadirpur
10	18	008	0064	Muradpur
10	18	008	0065	Chak Malkani
10	18	008	0066	Goddopur
10	18	008	0067	Chhitwara Kapur
10	18	008	0068	Chhitwara Kapur Urf Chitwara
10	18	008	0069	Shankarpur
10	18	008	0070	Chak Umar Khan
10	18	008	0071	Chak Shaikh Nizam
10	18	008	0072	Kushar Khas
10	18	008	0073	Chhatwara Rae Bhan
10	18	008	0074	Sherpur Chhatwara
10	18	008	0075	Nilkanthpur
10	18	008	0076	Narsinghpur Bagahi
10	18	008	0077	Rampur Chandarchan Urf Dagru
10	18	008	0078	Parmanandpur Chak Dara Urf Ram
10	18	008	0079	Milki Fatehpur
10	18	008	0080	Parmanandpur Lal
10	18	008	0081	Parmanandpur Buzurg
10	18	008	0082	Ramnagar Chak Dara
10	18	008	0083	Parmanand Chak Dara Urf Ramna.
10	18	008	0084	Manikpur Thegu Urf Akhtiarpur
10	18	008	0085	Banarsipur
10	18	008	0086	Maksudpur Taj
10	18	008	0087	Shahpur Chandan
10	18	008	0088	Abdulpur
10	18	008	0089	Rasulpur Bhagwan
10	18	008	0090	Fatehpur Mobarak
10	18	008	0091	Pirai
10	18	008	0092	Harpur Gangaram
10	18	008	0093	Harpur Gangaram
10	18	008	0094	Mirzapur
10	18	008	0095	Rasulpur Mobarak Urf Manikpur
10	18	008	0096	Tal Doghra
10	18	008	0097	Lachhmipur Tal Doghra
10	18	008	0098	Tal Doghra
10	18	008	0099	Alipur Makund
10	18	008	0100	Shahpur Chak Umar
10	18	008	0101	Mohammadpur Urf Pehmi Mohammad
10	18	008	0102	Chak Hariram
10	18	008	0103	Chhitrauli
10	18	008	0104	Sherpur Urf Manikpur
10	18	008	0105	Sherpur Bahori
10	18	008	0106	Harpur Jadu
10	18	008	0107	Chak Kishun
10	18	008	0108	Manpur
10	18	008	0109	Lachhmi Narayanpur
10	18	008	0110	Rampur
10	18	008	0111	Chak Wali
10	18	008	0112	Chak Mohammad Zama
10	18	008	0113	Bharathpur Singhara
10	18	008	0114	Balghat Bharathpur
10	18	008	0115	Singhara Buzurg
10	18	008	0116	Mohanpur Dhanraj
10	18	008	0117	Kushar Khap Katti
10	18	008	0118	Shamaspura
10	18	008	0119	Mohanpur Dhanraj
10	18	008	0120	Abbu Chak
10	18	008	0121	Gopalpur Mircha
10	18	008	0122	Madhopur Supaul Teria
10	18	008	0123	Rasulpur Daria Urf Khanpatti
10	18	008	0124	Jirwara Urf Pachis Kurwa
10	18	008	0125	Jahangirpur Salthani
10	18	008	0126	Harpur Belwa
10	18	008	0127	Chak Asia Urf Chak Kazim
10	18	008	0128	Hussainipur
10	18	008	0129	Paur Malshah Mohammadpur
10	18	008	0130	Gobindpur
10	18	008	0131	Khesrahia Urf Jagdishpur
10	18	008	0132	Lachmi Narayanpur
10	18	008	0133	Shah Mohammadpur
10	18	008	0134	Chak Bahdina Urf Bheria Pakri
10	18	008	0135	Chak Khaje
10	18	008	0136	Chak Umar

== See also ==
- List of villages in Vaishali district
