= Adalpur =

- Village
- Location within Bihar, India
- Coordinates: 25°42′19.8″N 85°12′32.1″E
- Country: India
- State: Bihar
- District: Vaishali
- Tehsil: Hajipur

Government
  - Type: Panchayati raj (India)
  - Body: Gram panchayat

Area
  - Total: 0.44 km^{2} (0.17 sq mi)

Population (2011)
  - Total: 1,844
  - Density: 4,200/km^{2} (11,000/sq mi)

Languages
  - Official: Hindi
- Time zone: UTC+5:30 (IST)
- ISO 3166 code: IN-BR

Adalpur is a village in Mohiuddin nagar.

== Demographics ==
As of the 2011 Census of India, Adalpur has a population of 1,844 spread over 372 households.

== Education facilities ==
Adalpur had 1 primary school.
