= Dargah Bela =

Village in Bihar, India

Dargah Bela is a small village in Vaishali district of Bihar, India.
