= Mahammadpur Turi =

- Village
- Mahammadpur Tori
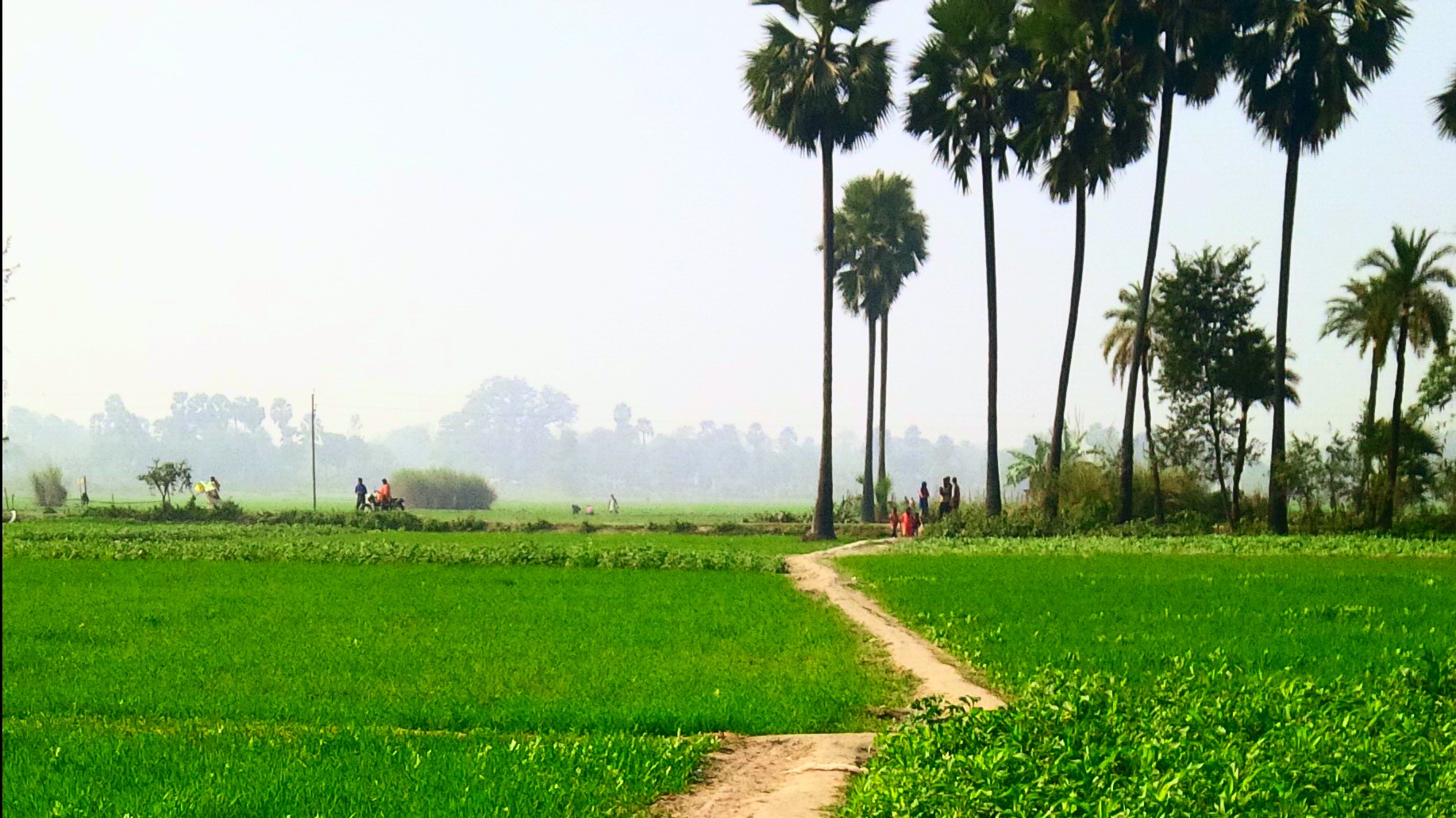
- crop field in Mahammadpur Turi

- Location in Bihar, India Mahammadpur Turi (India)
- Coordinates: 25.8449°N 85.4569°E
- Country: India
- State: Bihar
- District: Vaishali District
- Sub District: Chehrakala

Area
  - Total: 1.11 km^{2} (0.43 sq mi)
- Elevation: 56 m (184 ft)

Population (2011)
  - Total: 2,090
  - Density: 1,880/km^{2} (4,880/sq mi)

Languages
  - Official: Hindi; English
  - Spoken: Maithili
- Time zone: UTC+5:30 (IST)
- PIN: 844122
- Telephone code: 06227
- Vehicle registration: BR-31
- Weather: Weather
- Website: vaishali.nic.in

Mahammadpur Turi (officially Mohammadpur Tori) is a village in the Vaishali District of the Indian state of Bihar.

It is host to People's Pond.

== Demographics ==
As of the 2011 Indian census, Mahammadpur Turi has a population of 2,090 in 390 families. The population is 51 percent male and 49 percent female. Eighteen percent of the population is aged six or less.

The sex ratio is 948, which is higher than Bihar State average of 918. The child sex ratio is 1,053, which is higher than the Bihar State average of 935.

== Transport ==
Hajipur Junction railway station is 31.5 km (19.6 mi) from the village center. The village is serviced by the Jay Prakash Narayan Airport which is 56.2 km (34.9 mi) away.

The nearest cities by distance are – Mahua (8.4 km [5.2 mi]), Hajipur (31.5 km [19.6 mi]), Samastipur (40.5 km [25.2 mi]), Muzaffarpur (42.1 km [26.2 mi]), and Patna (50.8 km [31.6 mi]).
