= Matiya =

- Village
- Location in the Bihar state of India Matiya (India)
- Coordinates: 25°39′59″N 85°25′38″E
- Country: India
- State: Bihar
- District: Vaishali

Area
  - Total: 2.25 km^{2} (0.87 sq mi)

Population (December 2010)
  - Total: 1,200
  - Density: 600/km^{2} (1,600/sq mi)

Language
  - Official Language: English and Hindi
  - Regional Language: Bajjika
- Time zone: UTC+5:30 (IST)
- PIN: 844504
- Telephone code: +91-6229
- ISO 3166 code: IN-BR
- Nearest city: Hajipur and Patna
- Sex ratio: 1.009 Male/Female ♂/♀
- HDI: ▲0.589
- Literacy: 77%
- Lok Sabha constituency: Hajipur
- Vidhan Sabha constituency: Raja Pakar
- Climate: Typical Indian climate

Matiya is a village of Vaishali district in the Bihar state of India.

== Geography ==
According to the census of 2011 the total area of the village is 225 hectares.

== See also ==
List of villages in Vaishali district
