= Chehrakala =

Community development block in Vaishali district, Bihar, India

Chehrakala चेहराकला
- Community Development Block
- Location in Bihar, India
- Coordinates: 25.885679°N 85.380560°E
- Country: India
- State: Bihar
- Region: Mithila
- District: Vaishali
- District Sub-division: Mahua
- Anchal: Chehrakala
- Vidhan Sabha constituency: Mahua

Population (2001)
  - Total: 100,828

Languages
  - Official: Hindi
- Time zone: UTC+5:30 (IST)
- ISO 3166 code: IN-BR

Chehrakala (in Hindi: चेहराकला) is a block in the Vaishali district, Bihar State. According to the census website all blocks in Bihar State nomenclature as C.D. Block (community development blocks).

== Major roads ==
- SH-48

== Villages ==
There are 12 Panchayat and 49 villages in Chehrakala block.

There is an old House, made in 1965 named Moti Mahal. It is a landmark of Chehra Kala..
