= List of villages in Lalganj block =

This is a list of villages in Lalganj block, Vaishali district, Bihar state, India.

STCode10	DTCode18	SubdtCode003	VillCode0085	Villnameghataro charturbhuj
10	18	003	0000	Lalgan
10	18	003	0001	Jaitepur Urf Nurnagar
10	18	003	0002	Rasulpur Urf Rasulnagar
10	18	003	0003	Bedauli
10	18	003	0004	Kamalpur
10	18	003	0005	Sadullahpur
10	18	003	0006	Sararia Urf Saranthi Chhapra—B
10	18	003	0007	Bhusahi Urf Aurangabad
10	18	003	0008	Sarandia
10	18	003	0009	Yusufpur
10	18	003	0010	Khanjahan Chak Urf Saidenpur
10	18	003	0011	Jafrabad
10	18	003	0012	Khajauli Urf Aurangabad
10	18	003	0013	Tajpur
10	18	003	0014	Keshopur
10	18	003	0015	Pirapur Urf Shahabad
10	18	003	0016	Etwarpur Nizamat
10	18	003	0017	Jalalpur Gopi Maliki
10	18	003	0018	Jalalpur Gopi Mal
10	18	003	0019	Etwarpur Jagir
10	18	003	0020	Jalalpur Anrudh
10	18	003	0021	Jalalpur Urf Bishunpur Gamhir
10	18	003	0022	Mathurapur Patti Bishunpur
10	18	003	0023	Salahpur
10	18	003	0024	Warispur
10	18	003	0025	Jozira Allauldpur
10	18	003	0026	Attaulahpur
10	18	003	0027	Basanta Jahanabad
10	18	003	0028	Pach Damia
10	18	003	0029	Adhin pur
10	18	003	0030	Etwarpur Sisaula
10	18	003	0031	Manikpur Pakri
10	18	003	0032	Madsudan Pakri
10	18	003	0033	Laxminarayanpur Pakri
10	18	003	0034	Bhagwanpur Pakri
10	18	003	0035	Nurullahpur Urf Shampur Pakri
10	18	003	0036	Pakri Kanth
10	18	003	0037	Asadnagar Batraul
10	18	003	0038	Shahpur Kasim
10	18	003	0039	Basant Jagarnath
10	18	003	0040	Manpur Motaluke Ghatarodih
10	18	003	0041	Lalganj
10	18	003	0042	Kharauna Urf Misraulia
10	18	003	0043	Madhurapur Kusdeh
10	18	003	0044	Kuari
10	18	003	0045	Purkhauli
10	18	003	0046	Shahpur Tewari Urf Tutha
10	18	003	0047	Kobba Mohamad pir
10	18	003	0048	Shamaspura
10	18	003	0049	Puraina
10	18	003	0050	Sathiauta Bhagwan
10	18	003	0051	Akhtiarpur
10	18	003	0052	Barauna
10	18	003	0053	Puran Tanr
10	18	003	0054	Chak Rasul Urf Dilawarpur
10	18	003	0055	Pachrukhi
10	18	003	0056	Dilawarpur
10	18	003	0057	Rikhar
10	18	003	0058	Parmanandpur
10	18	003	0059	Kaulesar
10	18	003	0060	Chak Mobarak
10	18	003	0061	Kanti
10	18	003	0062	Bakhra Buzurg Urf Jagarnath
10	18	003	0063	Rampur Bakhra
10	18	003	0064	Chak Manauar
10	18	003	0065	Bara Dakhli
10	18	003	0066	Lakhan Sarinur
10	18	003	0067	Bishunpur Basdeo
10	18	003	0068	Lakhan Sarai TejSingh
10	18	003	0069	Paharpur
10	18	003	0070	Lalpura
10	18	003	0071	Chak Saleh Urf Lalpura
10	18	003	0072	Gobindpur Wafapur
10	18	003	0073	Sarwan Gobindpur
10	18	003	0074	Sirsa Ram Rai
10	18	003	0075	Sirsa Ghasi Urf Chitrauli
10	18	003	0076	Sirsa Biran
10	18	003	0077	Garauna
10	18	003	0078	Rahmatpur Sirsa Ram Rai
10	18	003	0079	Kishunpur Barhan
10	18	003	0080	Gurmia
10	18	003	0081	Akhtiarpur Mohan Urf Lautan
10	18	003	0082	Jadunathpur Chandwara
10	18	003	0083	Chak Partap
10	18	003	0084	Kartahan Buzurg
10	18	003	0085	Ghataro Chaturbhuj
10	18	003	0086	Jazira Sarkari Mahzi Ghataro
10	18	003	0087	Patepur
10	18	003	0088	Bhatauli Bhagwan
10	18	003	0089	Shekhpura Chak
10	18	003	0090	Jagdishpur Chaturbhuj Urf
10	18	003	0091	Shekhauna Chak
10	18	003	0092	Paura Madan Singh
10	18	003	0093	Anwarpur
10	18	003	0094	Bhakurahar
10	18	003	0095	Fatehabad Burhan
10	18	003	0096	Mani Bhakurahar
10	18	003	0097	Parbodhi Narind
10	18	003	0098	Andari

== See also ==
- List of villages in Vaishali district
