= Afazalpur Dhobghati Saidpur =

- Village
- Afazalpur Dhobghati Saidpur Location in Bihar, India Afazalpur Dhobghati Saidpur (India)
- Coordinates: 25°45′32.5″N 85°15′38.2″E
- Country: India
- State: Bihar
- District: vaishali

Population (2001)
  - Total: 2,224

Languages
  - Official: Hindi
- Time zone: UTC+5:30 (IST)

Afazalpur Dhobghati Saidpur is a village in Bihar, India.

== Geography ==
Afazalpur Dhobghati Saidpur Village is located at 25°45′32.5″N 85°15′38.2″E

== Village profile ==
- State :Bihar
- District :vaishali district
- Sub-district:Hajipur

== Area details ==
- Area of village (in hectares) :100
- Number of households :341

== population ==
- Total population=2,224
- Total male population=1150
- Total female population=1,074
- Scheduled castes population (total) =703
- Scheduled castes male =373
- Scheduled castes Females=330

== Approach to villages ==
- Nearest town =Hajipur
- Distance from the nearest town (in km) =8 km

== Land use Two decimal in hectares ==
- Total irrigated area =58.16
- other=58.16
- Unirrigated area=20.26
- Culturable waste (including gauchar and groves) =4.86
- Area not available for cultivation =17.06
