= List of villages in Mahnar block =

This is a list of villages in Mahnar block, Vaishali district, Bihar state, India.

STCode	DTCode	SubdtCode	VillCode	Villname
10	18	016	0000	Mahnar
10	18	016	0001	Baharpur Bishunpur
10	18	016	0002	Hasanpur Basahi
10	18	016	0003	Chamrahra
10	18	016	0004	Chak Hafiz Urf Milki Chak
10	18	016	0005	Hasanpur Urf Kaila
10	18	016	0006	Naurangpur
10	18	016	0007	Thanpur
10	18	016	0008	Parmanandpur
10	18	016	0009	Jalalpur
10	18	016	0010	Mohammadpur
10	18	016	0011	Bishunpur Ghausi
10	18	016	0012	Bharhan
10	18	016	0013	Manik Patti
10	18	016	0014	Derhpura
10	18	016	0015	Jaoj
10	18	016	0016	Mahindwara
10	18	016	0017	Chak Hardi
10	18	016	0018	Lodipur
10	18	016	0019	Lodipur Milik
10	18	016	0020	Rupsipur
10	18	016	0021	Makunpur Urf Makundpur
10	18	016	0022	Panapur Derh Bigahia
10	18	016	0023	Hargobindpur
10	18	016	0024	Shaikhpura
10	18	016	0025	Karnauti
10	18	016	0026	Sangrampur
10	18	016	0027	Rupnarayanpur
10	18	016	0028	Rupnarayanpur
10	18	016	0029	Sarmastpur
10	18	016	0030	Simra Urf Simra Chak Fatma
10	18	016	0031	Bazidpur Chak Usman
10	18	016	0032	Basdeopur
10	18	016	0033	Lodipur Phatikwara
10	18	016	0034	Fatikwara
10	18	016	0035	Harpur Fatikwara
