= Bettiah railway station =

Railway station in Bihar

Bettiah Railway Station
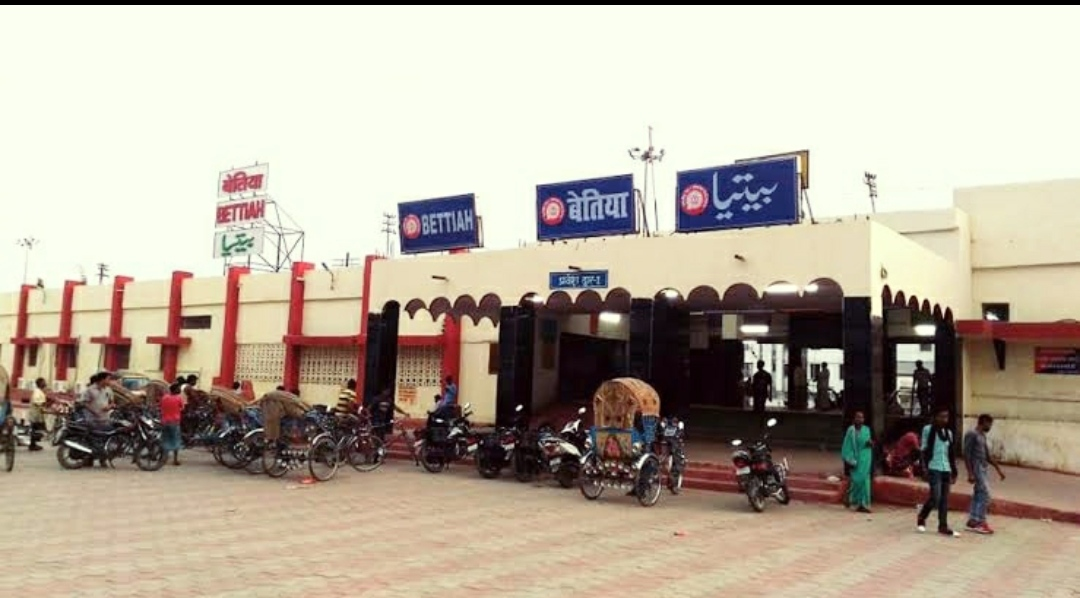

General information
- Location: Bettiah; West Champaran, Bihar; India
- Coordinates: 26.8058°N 84.5229°E
- Owner: Indian Railways
- Operator: Indian Railways
- Lines: Muzaffarpur – Gorakhpur lines, Barauni–Samastipur section
- Platforms: 3
- Tracks: 4

Construction
- Parking: Yes
- Cycle facilities: Yes

Other information
- Status: Active
- Station code: BTH
- Zone(s): East Central Railway zone
- Division(s): Samastipur

History
- Opened: 1911

Passengers
- 18000 Per Day
Location
- Location within Bihar Location within India

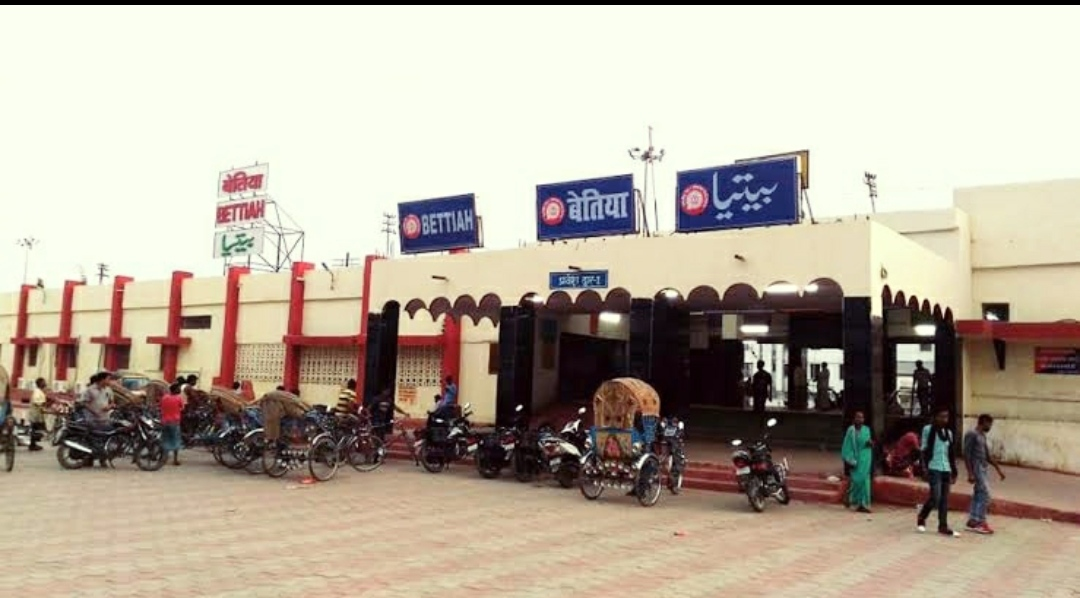
Railway Station Bettiah

Bettiah railway station (code BTH), is a railway station in India in the Samastipur Division of East Central Railway. Bettiah railway station is located in Bettiah city, administrative headquarters of the West Champaran district in the state of Bihar. Bettiah station is well connected to Patna, Muzaffarpur, Hajipur, Delhi, Mumbai, Kolkata, Howrah, Kanpur, Guwahati, Surat, Lucknow, Amritsar, Ranchi, and other major cities. It is also the originating station for many express trains.

== Redevlopment ==
The redevelopment of Bettiah railway station will be undertaken at a cost of ₹54 crore

== Connectivity ==
There are total 49 trains available, Train Departures ECR/East Central Zone – Railway Enquiry.which connect to some major cities of India viz., Amritsar, Bihar (Darbhanga, Katihar, Muzaffarpur, Narkatiaganj, Patliputra, Raxaul & Saharsa), Dehradun, Delhi (Anand Vihar), Guwahati, Gujarat (Ahmedabad & Porbandar), Howrah (Kolkata), Jaipur, Jammu, Mumbai (Bandra & LTT) and Uttar Pradesh (Bareilly, Kanpur, Lucknow & Manduadih).

== Trains ==
Samastipur is the divisional headquarters; several local passenger trains and express trains run from Bettiah to neighbouring destinations. List of some important trains that stop at Bettiah:Departures from BTH/Bettiah

Number	Train Name
12557/8	Sapt Kranti Express (MFP-ANVT)
15567/8	Bapudham Motihari - Anand Vihar Terminal Amrit Bharat Express (BMKI - ANVT)
15705/6	Champaran Humsafar Express (KIR-DLI)
15273/4	Satyagrah Express (RXL-ANVT)
19269/70	Porbandar–Muzaffarpur Express (PBR-MFP) VIA-DLI
12211/2	Muzaffarpur–Anand Vihar Garib Rath Express (ANVT-MFP)
14009/10	Champaran Satyagrah Express (ANVT-BMKI)
19039/40	Bandra Terminus–Muzaffarpur Avadh Express (BDTS-MFP)
15529/30	Saharsa–Anand Vihar Terminal Jan Sadharan Express (SHC-ANVT)
15655/6	Kamakhya–Shri Mata Vaishno Devi Katra Express (KYQ-SVDK)
15653/4	Amarnath Express (GHY-JAT)
15001/2	Rapti Ganga Express (MFP-DDN)
22551/2	Darbhanga–Jalandhar City Antyodaya Express (DBG-JUC)
15211/2	Jan Nayak Express (DBG-ASR)
12537/8	Bapu Dham Superfast Express (MFP-MUV)
15215/6	Muzaffarpur–Narkatiaganj Express (MFP-NKE)
25201/2	Patliputra–Narkatiaganj Intercity Express (PPTA-NKE)
12537/8	Muzaffarpur Prayagraj Bapudham Express

*Pending

- Pair of passenger train run from Gorakhpur to Bettiah
- Pair of MEMU passenger train run from Muzaffarpur to Bettiah
- Pair of trains run from Raxaul to Bettiah

Doubling MFP-NKE-PNY undergoing project.

== Platforms ==
There are 3 platforms at Bettiah Railway Station. The platforms are interconnected with one foot overbridges (FOB). Platform 1 & 2 are the busiest platforms and are mostly used for long-haul trains.
