= Bapudham Motihari – Anand Vihar Terminal Amrit Bharat Express =

Amrit Bharat Express train route in India

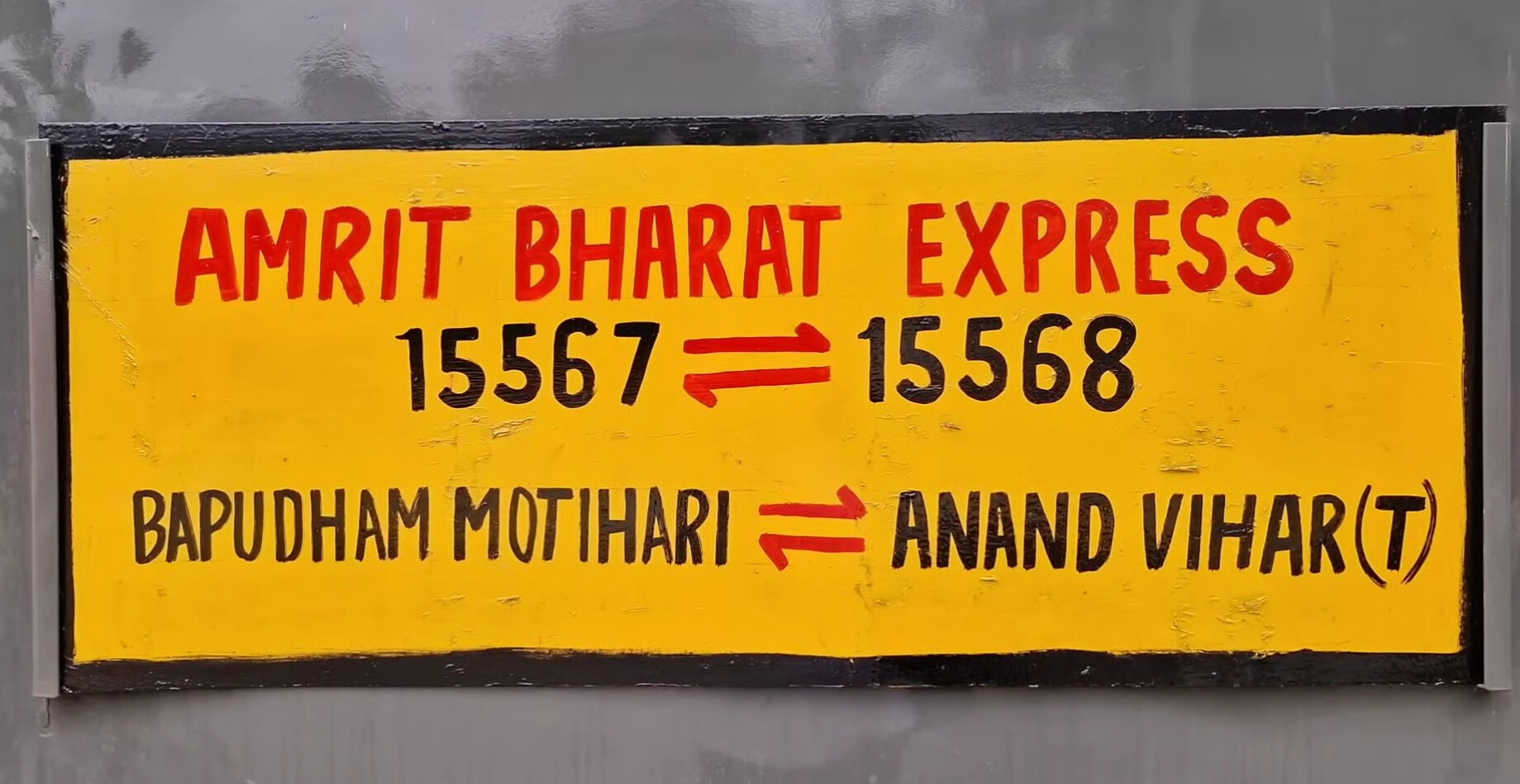

Overview
- Service type: Amrit Bharat Express, Mail/Express
- Locale: Bihar, Uttar Pradesh and Delhi
- First service: 18 July 2025 (Inaugural); 29 July 2025 (Commercial)
- Current operator: East Central Railways (ECR)

Route
- Termini: Bapudham Motihari (BMKI); Anand Vihar Terminal (ANVT)
- Stops: 16
- Distance travelled: 978 km (608 mi)
- Average journey time: 22h 10m
- Service frequency: Bi-weekly
- Train number: 15567 / 15568
- Lines used: Bapudham Motihari–Narkatiaganj line; Narkatiaganj–Kaptanganj line; Gorakhpur–Lucknow Charbagh line; Lucknow Charbagh–Bareilly–Moradabad line; Moradabad–Ghaziabad–Anand Vihar Terminal line

On-board services
- Class: Sleeper class (SL) General Unreserved (GS)
- Seating arrangements: Yes
- Sleeping arrangements: Yes
- Auto-rack arrangements: Upper
- Catering facilities: E-catering, on-board, pantry car
- Observation facilities: Saffron-grey
- Entertainment facilities: Electric outlets; Reading lights; Bottle holder
- Other facilities: CCTV cameras; Bio-vacuum toilets; Foot-operated water taps; Passenger information system

Technical
- Rolling stock: Modified LHB coaches
- Track gauge: Indian gauge
- Electrification: 25 kV 50 Hz AC overhead line
- Operating speed: 44 km/h (27 mph) (Average speed)
- Average length: 23.54 m (77.2 ft) (each) and 22 coaches
- Track owner: Indian Railways
- Rake maintenance: Muzaffarpur Jn (MFP)
- Rake sharing: No

The 15567/15568 Bapudham Motihari – Anand Vihar Terminal Amrit Bharat Express is India's 7th Non-AC Superfast Amrit Bharat Express train. It connects Motihari, the headquarters of the East Champaran district in Bihar with national capital, New Delhi.

This express train was inaugurated on July 18, 2025, by Prime Minister Narendra Modi.

== Rakes ==
The train uses a dedicated Amrit Bharat 2.0 trainset, the locomotives of which are designed by Chittaranjan Locomotive Works (CLW) in Chittaranjan, West Bengal and the coaches are designed and manufactured by the Integral Coach Factory at Perambur, Chennai under the Make in India initiative.

The rake has 22 coaches, out of which 2 are Seating cum Luggage (SLR) coaches, 11 are General Unreserved (GS) coaches, 8 are Sleeper class (SL) coaches and 1 is a pantry car (PC) coach. The primary maintenance of the rake is executed at Muzaffarpur Junction.

== Service ==
- The 15567 Bapudham Motihari – Anand Vihar Terminal Amrit Bharat Express leaves Bapudham Motihari at 08:00 hrs every Tuesday and Friday and reaches Anand Vihar Terminal the next day at 06:10 hrs. It covers its journey in 22 hrs 10 min, averaging at 44 km/h (27 mph).
- The 15568 Anand Vihar Terminal – Bapudham Motihari Amrit Bharat Express leaves Anand Vihar Terminal at 14:00 hrs every Wednesday and Saturday and reaches Bapudham Motihari the next day at 10:40 hrs. It covers its journey in 20 hrs 40 min, averaging at 47 km/h (29 mph).
- The maximum permissible speed of this train is 110 km/h (68 mph).

== Route and halts ==
The halts for this Amrit Bharat Express will is given below:

1. Bapudham Motihari (start)
2. Sagauli Junction
3. Bettiah
4. Chanpatia
5. Narkatiaganj Junction
6. Harinagar
7. Bagaha
8. Siswa Bazar
9. Kaptanganj Junction
10. Gorakhpur Junction
11. Basti
12. Mankapur Junction
13. Gonda Junction
14. Lucknow Charbagh
15. Bareilly Junction
16. Moradabad Junction
17. Ghaziabad Junction
18. Anand Vihar Terminal (end)

== See also ==
- Amrit Bharat Express
- Vande Bharat Express
- Tejas Express
- Gatimaan Express
- Bapudham Motihari railway station
- Anand Vihar Terminal railway station
