= Muzaffarpur–Narkatiaganj Express =

Train in India

Muzaffarpur - Narkatiaganj Express

Overview
- Service type: Express
- Current operator: East Central Railway zone

Route
- Termini: Muzaffarpur Junction (MFP); Narkatiaganj Junction (NKE)
- Stops: 11
- Distance travelled: 160 km (99 mi)
- Average journey time: 4h 30m
- Service frequency: Daily (Note: Runs seven days in a week for every direction.)
- Train number: 15215/15216

On-board services
- Class: General Unreserved
- Seating arrangements: Yes
- Sleeping arrangements: No
- Catering facilities: No
- Observation facilities: ICF coach
- Entertainment facilities: No
- Baggage facilities: No
- Other facilities: Below the seats

Technical
- Rolling stock: 2
- Track gauge: 1,676 mm (5 ft 6 in)
- Operating speed: 36 km/h (22 mph), including halts
Route map
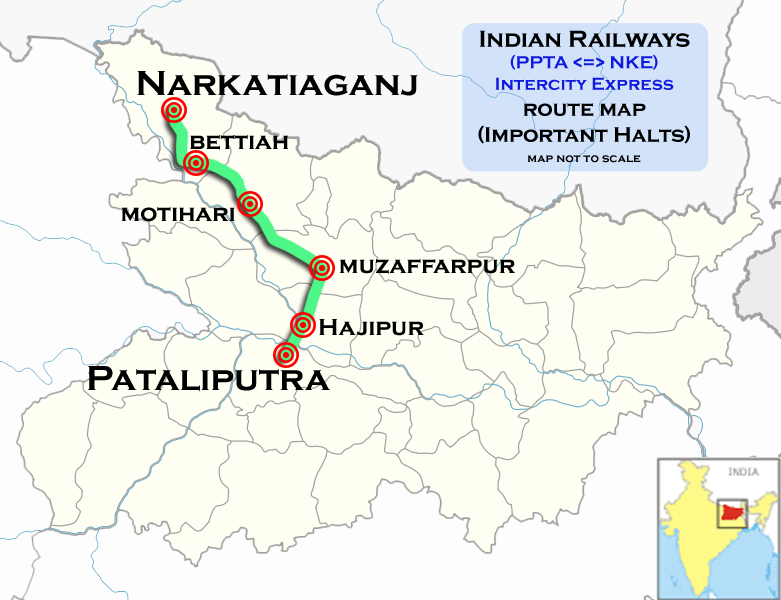

The Muzaffarpur - Narkatiaganj Express is an Express train belonging to East Central Railway zone that runs between Muzaffarpur Junction and Narkatiaganj Junction in India. It is currently being operated with 15215/15216 train numbers on a daily basis.

== Service ==
The 15215/Muzaffarpur - Narkatiaganj Express has an average speed of 36 km/h and covers 160 km in 4h 30m. The 15216/Narkatiaganj - Muzaffarpur Express has an average speed of 40 km/h and covers 160 km in 4h.

== Route and halts ==
The important halts of the train are:

- Muzaffarpur Junction
- Mehsi
- Bapudham Motihari
- Sagauli Junction
- Bettiah
- Narkatiaganj Junction

== Coach composite ==
The train has standard ICF rakes with a max speed of 110 kmph. The train consists of 10 coaches :

- 8 General Unreserved
- 2 Seating cum Luggage Rake

== Traction ==
Both trains are hauled by a Gonda Loco Shed based WDM 3A or Samastipur Loco Shed based WDM 3A diesel locomotive from Muzaffarpur to Narkatiaganj and vice versa.

== See also ==
- Muzaffarpur Junction railway station
- Narkatiaganj Junction railway station
- Patliputra - Narkatiaganj Intercity Express
