= Muzaffarpur–Gorakhpur main line =

Railway line in India

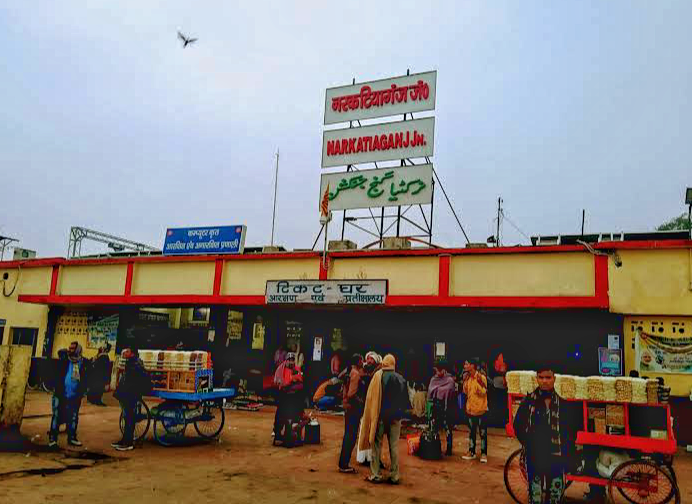
- Narkatiaganj Junction railway station is an important Railway Station on Muzaffarpur–Gorakhpur main line

Overview
- Status: Operational
- Owner: Indian Railways
- Locale: Bihar and Uttar Pradesh
- Termini: Muzaffarpur Junction; Gorakhpur Junction
- Stations: 50

Service
- Type: Passenger and freight train line
- System: Indian Railways
- Operator(s): ECR, NER

Technical
- Line length: 309.72 km
- Number of tracks: Double (Some Sections still Single Line)
- Track gauge: 1,676 mm (5 ft 6 in)
- Electrification: 2014; 12 years ago, 25 kV AC 50 Hz
- Operating speed: Up to 110 km/h (Some Section at 100 km/h)

The Muzaffarpur–Gorakhpur main line is an important broad-gauge railway line connecting Muzaffarpur Junction in Bihar with Gorakhpur Junction in Uttar Pradesh, India. The route passes through the fertile plains of North Bihar and forms a vital transport corridor for both passenger and freight trains. It falls under the administrative control of the East Central Railway zone and the North Eastern Railway zone.

== Route ==
The line runs east–west across the Gangetic plains, serving multiple districts of northern Bihar and eastern Uttar Pradesh. Key stations on the route include:

- Muzaffarpur Junction (MFP)
- Motipur
- Mehsi
- Chakia
- Bapudham Motihari
- Sagauli Junction
- Bettiah
- Narkatiaganj Junction
- Harinagar
- Valmikinagar Road
- Kaptanganj Junction
- Gorakhpur Junction (GKP)

The total length of the route is approximately 309.72 km.

== History ==
The Muzaffarpur–Gorakhpur corridor was developed gradually during the late 19th and early 20th centuries as part of the north Bihar rail expansion led by the Bengal and North Western Railway (B&NWR) and the Tirhut Railway. The line linking Muzaffarpur with Narkatiaganj and onward to Gorakhpur was completed in stages and became fully operational during the 1930s.

After Indian independence, the B&NWR was merged into the Oudh and Tirhut Railway, which later became part of the North Eastern Railway zone. The section between Muzaffarpur and Narkatiaganj was later transferred to the East Central Railway zone after the creation of new railway zones in 2002.

During the post-independence period, the route underwent several phases of modernization, including gauge strengthening, signalling upgrades, and partial track renewals. The entire Muzaffarpur–Narkatiaganj–Gorakhpur section was subsequently electrified with 25 kV AC overhead lines in the 2010s.

In 2023, the Government of India sanctioned funding of about ₹150 crore for the Muzaffarpur–Valmikinagar–Gorakhpur line doubling project, aimed at reducing congestion and improving operational efficiency.

== Electrification ==
The complete Muzaffarpur–Narkatiaganj–Gorakhpur section is electrified at 25 kV AC, 50 Hz. Electrification was executed in phases to enable seamless electric traction across northern Bihar and adjoining areas of eastern Uttar Pradesh.

== Speed limit ==
The line is classified as a Group D route under Indian Railways standards, with a maximum permissible speed (MPS) of 100–110 km/h on most sections.

== Major trains ==
The following major trains operate on or pass through the Muzaffarpur–Gorakhpur main line:

Train name	Train no.	Terminating stations
Sapt Kranti Express	12557 / 12558	Muzaffarpur Junction → Anand Vihar Terminal
Gorakhpur–Patliputra Vande Bharat Express	22349 / 22350	Gorakhpur Junction → Patliputra Junction
Porbandar–Muzaffarpur Express	19269 / 19270	Porbandar → Muzaffarpur Junction
Muzaffarpur Prayagraj Bapudham Express	15119 / 15120	Muzaffarpur Junction → Prayagraj Junction
Muzaffarpur–Anand Vihar Garib Rath Express	12211 / 12212	Muzaffarpur Junction → Anand Vihar Terminal
Rapti Ganga Express	15049 / 15050	Muzaffarpur Junction → Shaktinagar
Champaran Satyagrah Express	14009 / 14010	Bapudham Motihari → Delhi Junction
Champaran Humsafar Express	15705 / 15706	Katihar Junction → Delhi Junction
Bapudham Motihari–Anand Vihar Terminal Amrit Bharat Express	22487 / 22488	Bapudham Motihari → Anand Vihar Terminal
Purvanchal Express	15047 / 15048	Gorakhpur Junction → Kolkata
Amarnath Express	15097 / 15098	Bhubaneswar → Jammu Tawi
Mithila Express	13021 / 13022	Raxaul Junction → Howrah Junction

== Significance ==
The Muzaffarpur–Gorakhpur main line serves as a vital east–west rail corridor for northern Bihar, improving regional connectivity with Uttar Pradesh and beyond. It supports passenger mobility, trade, and tourism, and also provides a logistical backbone for freight operations in the region.

== Doubling ==
The doubling of the Muzaffarpur–Gorakhpur main line is an ongoing railway project aimed at adding a second track to enhance capacity, reduce travel time, and improve connectivity. The project, whose foundation stone was laid in 2018, is being executed in multiple phases at an estimated cost of ₹1,120.66 crore for the entire 310 km stretch from Muzaffarpur to Gorakhpur. Once fully completed, it is expected to reduce the travel time between the two cities to around four hours.

A major portion of the doubling work has already been completed, and trains are now operating on both tracks along several sections of the route.

== See also ==
- East Central Railway zone
- North Eastern Railway zone
- Samastipur railway division
- Muzaffarpur
- Gorakhpur
