= Bandra Terminus–Barauni Avadh Express =

Train in India

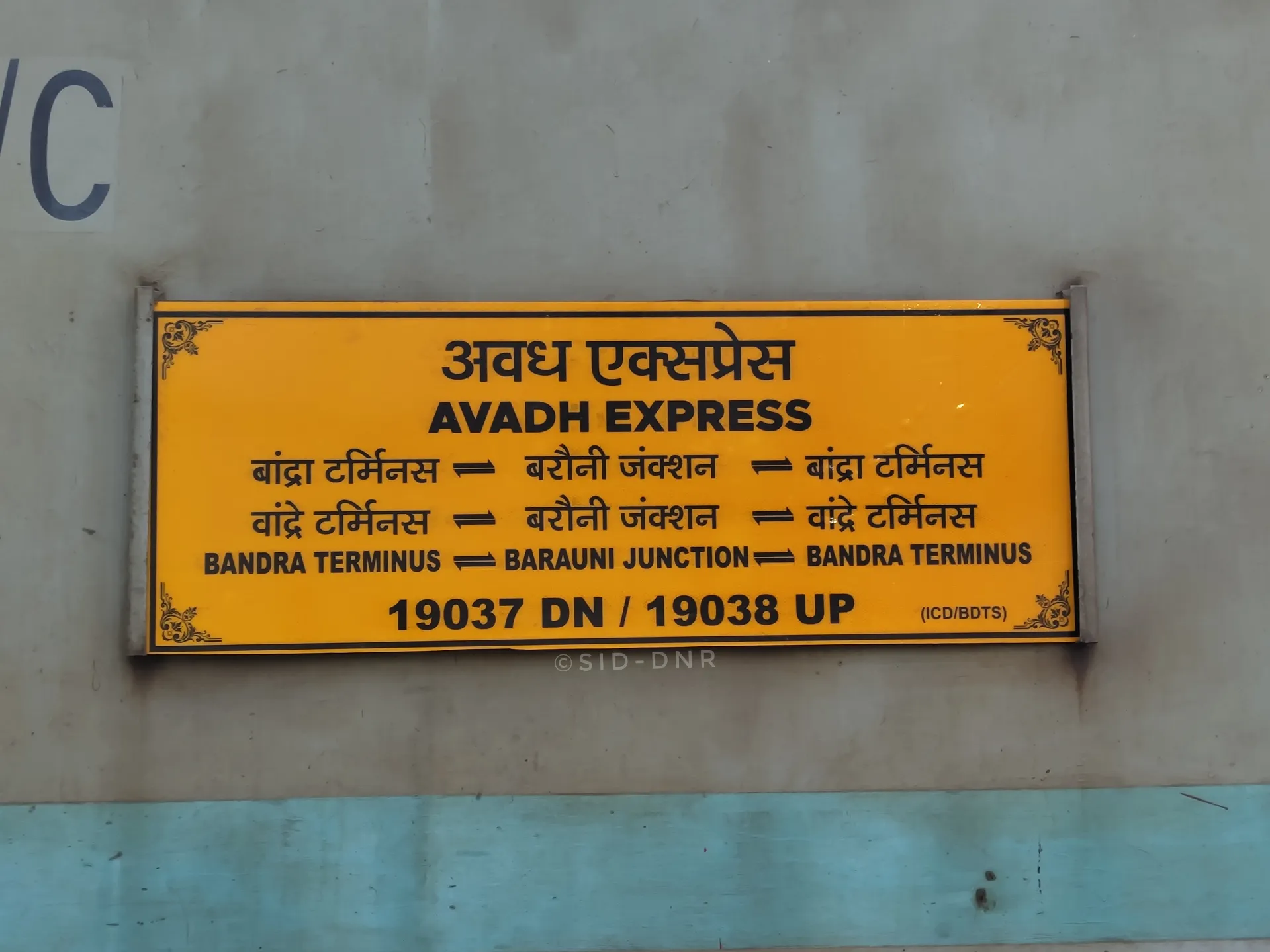
- BDTS - BJU Avadh Express train board.

Overview
- Service type: Express
- Status: Active
- Locale: Bihar, Uttar Pradesh, Rajasthan, Gujarat and Maharashtra
- First service: 8 May 1974; 52 years ago
- Current operator: Western Railway

Route
- Termini: Bandra Terminus (BDTS); Barauni Junction (BJU)
- Stops: 87
- Distance travelled: 2,254 km (1,401 mi)
- Average journey time: 49 Hours
- Service frequency: Daily
- Train number: 15589 / 15590

On-board services
- Classes: AC First Class, AC 2 Tier, AC 3 Tier, AC 3 Tier Economy, Sleeper Class, General Unreserved
- Seating arrangements: Yes
- Sleeping arrangements: Yes
- Catering facilities: IRCTC E-Catering , Zomato & Swiggy
- Observation facilities: Large windows
- Baggage facilities: Available
- Other facilities: Below the seats

Technical
- Rolling stock: LHB coach
- Track gauge: 1,676 mm (5 ft 6 in)
- Operating speed: 130 km/h (max), 52 km/h (avg) including halts

The 19037 / 19038 Bandra Terminus-Barauni Avadh Express is an express train operated by Indian Railways-Western Railway zone, connecting Bandra Terminus in Mumbai, Maharashtra with Barauni in Bihar, passing through Muzaffarpur, Gorakhpur, Lucknow, Kota, Vadodara and Surat along the way.

== Overview ==
The 19037/38 Avadh Express was initially introduced as the Agra-Lucknow Avadh Express. Over time, it was extended in both directions. First, it was extended to Kota and then to Ratlam on one side, and to Gorakhpur, Muzaffarpur, and finally to Barauni on the other side. Eventually, the train was further extended to Mumbai and now operates as the Bandra Terminus–Barauni Avadh Express.

Earlier, the number of stops on the Kota-Mumbai stretch was limited. However, over time, the train began stopping at more stations along the route. This is one reason why it now takes the Western Line, which is a longer route, instead of the Central Line via Bhusawal and Itarsi.

== Schedule ==
19037 / 19038 Avadh Express Schedule
Train Type	Mail/Express
Distance	2255 km
Average Speed	~46 km/h
Journey Time (Bandra → Barauni)	49 hrs 10 min
Journey Time (Barauni → Bandra)	44 hrs 45 min
Classes Available	1A, 2A, 3A, 3E, SL, GEN, PWD
Operating Days	Daily
Operator	Western Railway

== Route & halts ==
19037 Bandra Terminus–Barauni Avadh Express and 19038 Barauni–Bandra Terminus Avadh Express Schedule
Sr.	19037 BDTS–BJU				19038 BJU–BDTS			
Sr.	Station	Day	Arr.	Dep.	Station	Day	Arr.	Dep.
1	Bandra Terminus	1	—	22:00	Barauni Junction	1	—	07:20
2	Andheri	1	22:08	22:10	Samastipur Junction	1	08:28	08:33
3	Surat	2	02:09	02:14	Muzaffarpur Junction	1	09:35	09:40
4	Vadodara Junction	2	03:47	03:57	Motipur	1	10:12	10:14
5	Ratlam Junction	2	07:45	07:55	Mehsi	1	10:27	10:29
6	Kota Junction	2	12:30	12:40	Chakia	1	10:38	10:40
7	Sawai Madhopur Junction	2	14:18	14:23	Pipra	1	10:50	10:52
8	Agra Fort	2	19:10	19:20	Bapudham Motihari	1	11:09	11:11
9	Tundla Junction	2	20:45	20:50	Sagauli Junction	1	11:29	11:31
10	Firozabad	2	21:25	21:27	Bettiah	1	11:53	11:55
11	Kanpur Central	3	01:35	01:45	Narkatiaganj Junction	1	12:55	13:00
12	Lucknow City	3	03:42	03:44	Harinagar	1	13:14	13:16
13	Barabanki Junction	3	04:46	04:48	Bagaha	1	13:56	13:58
14	Gonda Junction	3	07:15	07:20	Paniya Hawa	1	14:53	14:55
15	Basti	3	09:08	09:11	Khada	1	15:05	15:07
16	Gorakhpur Junction	3	11:25	11:35	Siswa Bazar	1	15:22	15:24
17	Pipraich	3	12:04	12:06	Kaptanganj Junction	1	15:50	15:55
18	Kaptanganj Junction	3	12:20	12:25	Pipraich	1	16:13	16:15
19	Siswa Bazar	3	13:18	13:20	Gorakhpur Junction	1	17:08	17:18
20	Khada	3	13:48	13:50	Sahjanwa	1	17:45	17:47
21	Paniya Hawa	3	13:58	14:00	Maghar	1	17:57	17:59
22	Bagaha	3	14:39	14:41	Khalilabad	1	18:20	18:22
23	Harinagar	3	15:08	15:10	Basti	1	18:45	18:48
24	Narkatiaganj Junction	3	15:55	16:00	Gaur	1	19:08	19:10
25	Bettiah	3	16:43	16:45	Babhnan	1	19:20	19:22
26	Sagauli Junction	3	17:08	17:10	S Narayan Chhapia	1	19:34	19:36
27	Bapudham Motihari	3	17:28	17:30	Maskanwa	1	19:44	19:46
28	Chakia	3	18:05	18:07	Mankapur Junction	1	20:02	20:04
29	Mehsi	3	18:17	18:19	Gonda Junction	2	20:30	20:35
30	Motipur	3	18:58	19:00	Colonelganj	2	21:00	21:02
31	Muzaffarpur Junction	3	20:55	21:00	Jarwal Road	2	21:18	21:20
32	Samastipur Junction	3	21:45	21:50	Burhwal Junction	2	21:38	21:40
33	Barauni Junction	3	23:10	DSTN	Barabanki Junction	2	22:33	22:35

== Coach composition ==
Coach Composition:-

LOCO	EOG	GEN	H1	HA1	A1	A2	M1	M2	M3	PC	B1	B2	B3	B4	B5	B6	B7	S1	S2	S3	S4	S5	GEN	EOG

19037 / 19038 Avadh Express Coach Composition
Category	Coaches	Total	Description
LPR (Luggage/Parcel Rake)	LPR	2	Luggage/Parcel rake coaches
General Unreserved (GEN)	GEN1, GEN2	2	General class coaches (unreserved)
Sleeper Class (SL)	S1, S2, S3, S4, S5	5	Non-AC sleeper coaches
Pantry Car (PC)	PC	1	Pantry car for onboard catering
AC 3 Tier (3E)	M1, M2, M3	3	AC 3-Tier sleeper coaches
AC 3 Tier (3A)	B1, B2, B3, B4, B5, B6, B7	7	AC 3-Tier sleeper coaches
AC 2 Tier (2A)	A1, A2	2	AC 2-Tier sleeper coaches
AC First Class (1A + 2A)	HA1	1	Combined AC First Class and AC 2-Tier sleeper coach
AC First Class (1A)	H1	1	AC First Class
SLR (Seating–Luggage Rake)	SLR	1	Guards and luggage coach

- Primary Maintenance - Bandra Coaching Depot
- Secondary Maintenance - Barauni Coaching Depot

== See also ==
- Surat–Muzaffarpur Express
- Shramik Express
- Pawan Express
- Ahmedabad - Saharsa Express
