= Muzaffarpur - Dehradun Express =

Train service in India

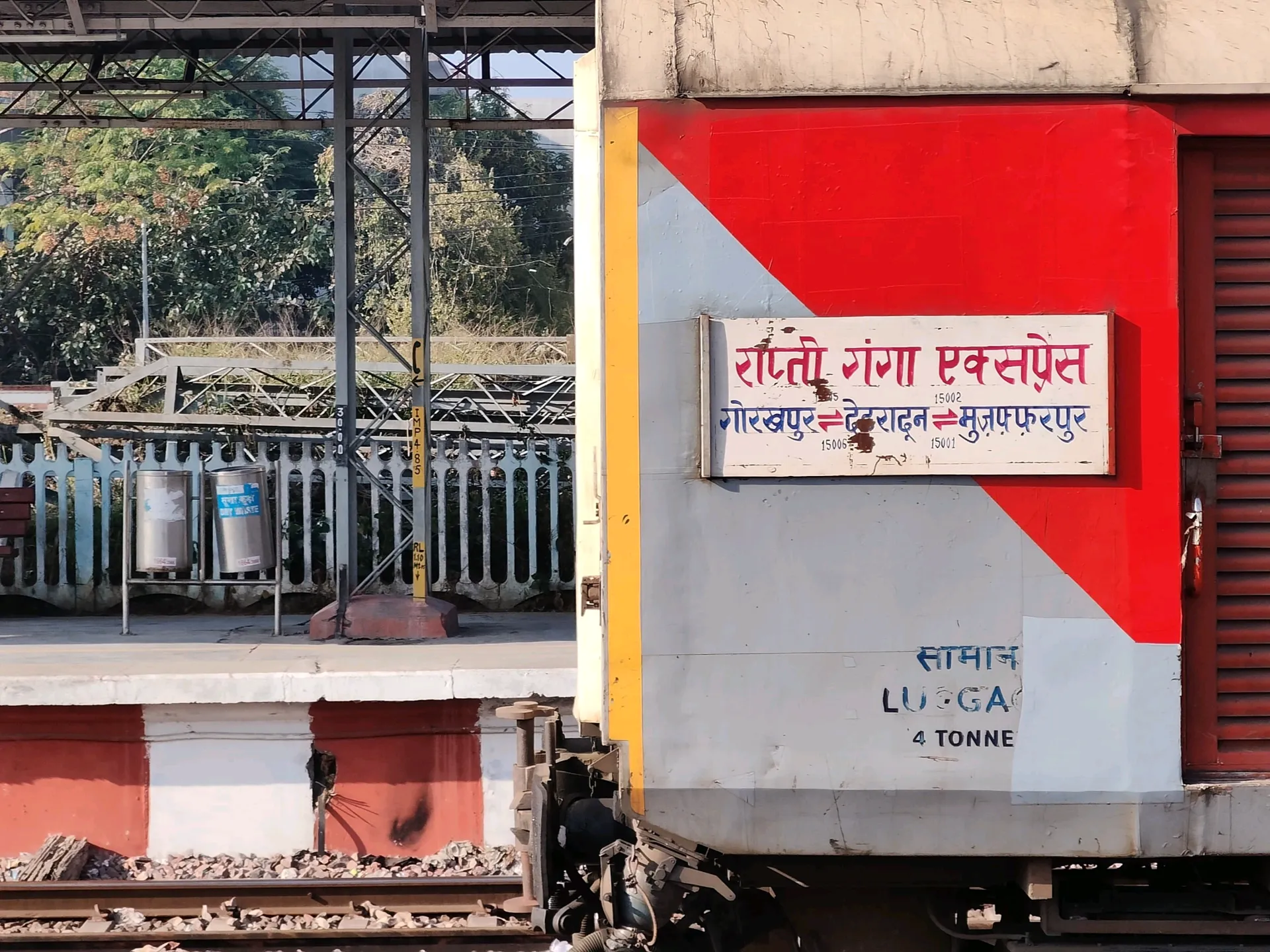
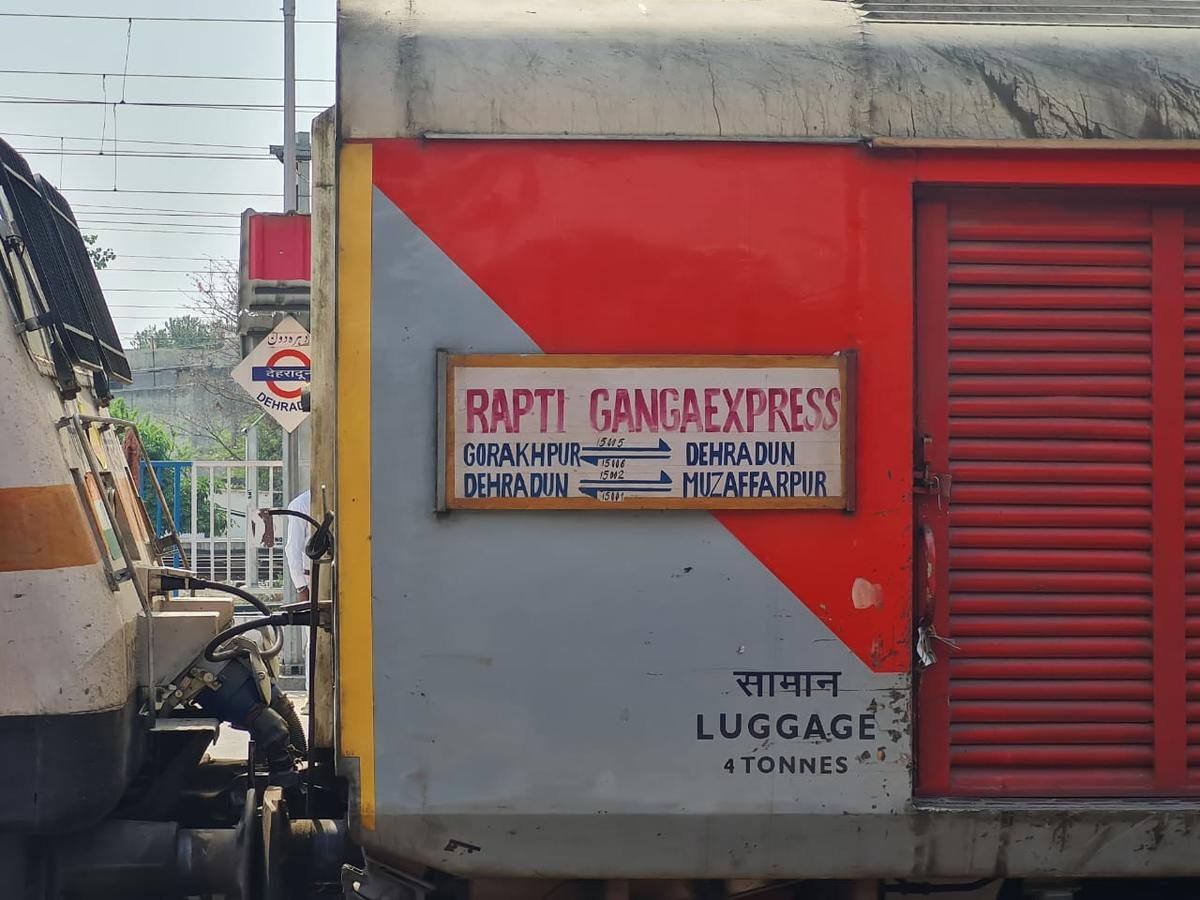

Overview
- Service type: Express
- Locale: Bihar, Uttar Pradesh & Uttrakhand
- Current operator: ECR

Route
- Service frequency: Weekly
- Train number: 15001 / 15002

On-board services
- Classes: AC 1 Tier, AC 2 Tier, AC 3 Tier, Sleeper class & General Unreserved
- Seating arrangements: Yes
- Sleeping arrangements: Yes
- Catering facilities: Available
- Observation facilities: Large windows
- Entertainment facilities: No
- Baggage facilities: Below the seats

Technical
- Rolling stock: LHB coach
- Track gauge: 1,676 mm (5 ft 6 in)
- Operating speed: 110 km/h (68 mph) maximum, 50–55 km/h (31–34 mph) average including halts

The Muzaffarpur–Dehradun Express (train numbers 15001/15002) is a weekly train service connecting Muzaffarpur Junction (MFP) in Bihar to Dehradun railway station (DDN) in Uttarakhand.

The Muzaffarpur–Dehradun Express is a vital train for the people of North Bihar as it provides a direct and convenient connection to Dehradun and Haridwar, important centers for education, tourism, and pilgrimage. This is the only train that directly connects North Bihar to Devbhumi Uttarakhand and has high demand throughout the year due to its importance and convenience.

== Coach composition ==
Category	Coaches	Total
Composite First AC + Second AC (HA1)	HA1	1
AC 2 Tier (2A)	A1, A2	2
AC 3 Tier (3A)	B1, B2, B3, B4, B5	5
Sleeper Class (SL)	S1, S2, S3	3
General Unreserved (GEN)	GN, GN, GN, GN	4
Seating cum Luggage Rake (SLR)	SLR, SLR	2
Total Coaches		17

- Primary Maintenance - Muzaffarpur Coaching Depot

== Schedule ==
15001 / 15002 Muzaffarpur–Dehradun Express Schedule
Train Type	Express
Distance	1124 km (15001) / 1124 km (15002)
Average Speed	~46 km/h
Journey Time (MFP → DDN)	~24 hrs 15 min
Journey Time (DDN → MFP)	~25 hrs 15 min
Classes Available	1A, 2A, 3A, SL, GN
Operating Days	Weekly
Operator	East Central Railway

== Route ==
15001 Muzaffarpur–Dehradun Express and 15002 Dehradun–Muzaffarpur Express Schedule
Sr.	15001 MFP–DDN				15002 DDN–MFP			
Sr.	Station	Day	Arr.	Dep.	Station	Day	Arr.	Dep.
1	Muzaffarpur Junction	1	—	14:00	Dehradun	1	—	15:15
2	Mehsi	1	14:40	14:42	Haridwar Junction	1	16:37	16:47
3	Chakia	1	14:54	14:56	Laksar Junction	1	17:11	17:16
4	Bapudm Motihari	1	15:30	15:32	Najibabad Junction	1	17:45	17:50
5	Sagauli Junction	1	15:56	15:58	Moradabad	1	20:05	20:15
6	Bettiah	1	16:20	16:22	Rampur	1	20:43	20:45
7	Narkatiaganj Junction	1	17:10	17:15	Bareilly Junction	1	21:40	21:42
8	Harinagar	1	17:28	17:30	Shahjahanpur	1	23:07	23:09
9	Bagaha	1	18:17	18:20	Hardoi	1	23:57	23:59
10	Siswa Bazar	1	19:35	19:37	Lucknow Junction	2	01:55	02:05
11	Kaptanganj Junction	1	19:55	19:57	Barabanki Junction	2	03:03	03:05
12	Gorakhpur Junction	1	21:05	21:15	Gonda Junction	2	04:40	04:50
13	Khalilabad	1	21:51	21:53	Mankapur Junction	2	05:18	05:20
14	Basti	1	22:16	22:19	Basti	2	06:27	06:30
15	Mankapur Junction	1	23:05	23:07	Khalilabad	2	06:51	06:53
16	Gonda Junction	1	23:35	23:40	Gorakhpur Junction	2	07:50	08:00
17	Barabanki Junction	2	01:43	01:45	Kaptanganj Junction	2	08:50	08:55
18	Lucknow Junction	2	02:45	02:55	Siswa Bazar	2	09:18	09:20
19	Hardoi	2	04:25	04:27	Bagaha	2	11:07	11:09
20	Shahjahanpur	2	05:28	05:30	Harinagar	2	11:32	11:34
21	Bareilly Junction	2	06:45	06:50	Narkatiaganj Junction	2	12:10	12:15
22	Rampur	2	07:36	07:38	Bettiah	2	12:48	12:50
23	Moradabad	2	08:30	08:40	Sagauli Junction	2	13:13	13:15
24	Najibabad Junction	2	10:17	10:19	Bapudm Motihari	2	13:43	13:45
25	Laksar Junction	2	11:00	11:05	Chakia	2	14:23	14:25
26	Haridwar Junction	2	12:20	12:25	Mehsi	2	14:34	14:36
27	Dehradun	2	14:15	—	Muzaffarpur Junction	2	16:30	—

== Rake sharing ==
15001 /02 Share its Rake with Gorakhpur–Dehradun Rapti Ganga Express
