= Bapudham Motihari railway station =

Railway station in East Champaran, Bihar, India

Bapudham Motihari
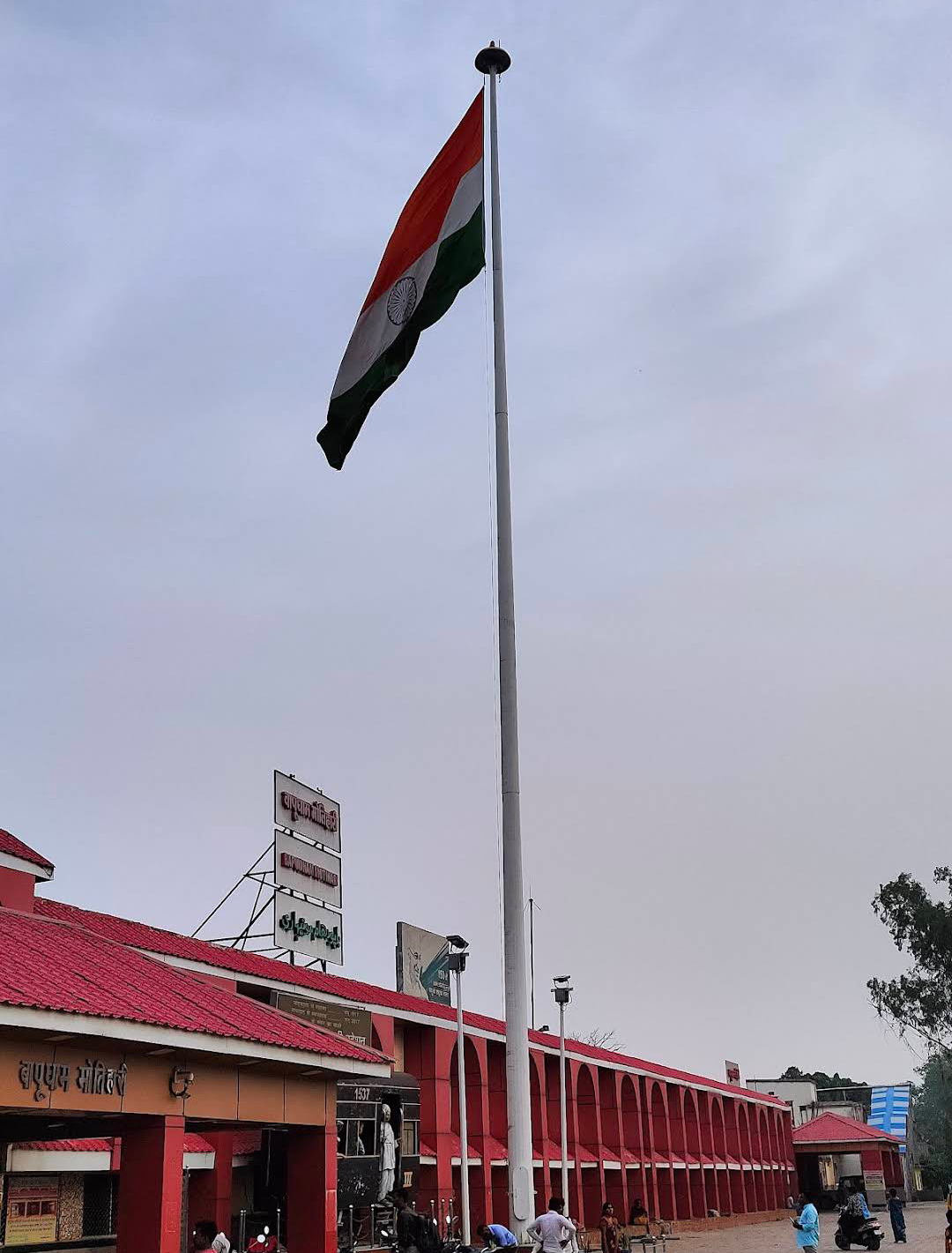
- Bapudham Motihari Railway Station Entrance

General information
- Location: Bapudham Motihari, Belbawana, Motihari, Bihar 845401; India
- Owner: Indian Railways
- Operator: East Central Railway
- Platforms: 2
- Tracks: 5
- Connections: Auto stand & Bus stand

Construction
- Structure type: Standard (on-ground station)
- Parking: Available
- Cycle facilities: Not available
- Accessible: Available

Other information
- Status: Functional
- Station code: BMKI
- Zone(s): East Central Railway
- Division(s): Samastipur
- Classification: NSG-3

History
- Rebuilt: Under Construction
- Electrified: 10 Years Ago
Location

Bapudham Motihari Railway Station (previously Motihari Railway Station) is a major railway station in Motihari through which 2 lines pass one towards Muzaffarpur and other towards Gorakhpur, it lies in the headquarter city of East Champaran district of Bihar. Its station code is BMKI. The station mainly consists of 2 platforms and acts as the main station in the city of Motihari, which is being developed under 'The Amrit Bharat Station Scheme' and to celebrate 150 years of Mahatama Gandhi.

== Trains ==
- Champaran Satyagrah Express
- Muzaffarpur Prayagraj Bapudham Express
- Sapt Kranti Express
- Champaran Humsafar Express
- Porbandar-Muzaffarpur Express
- Muzaffarpur–Anand Vihar Garib Rath Express
- Muzaffarpur Dehradun Express
- Bmki-Anvt Amrit bharat express

== Connectivity ==
There are total 130 trains available, which connect to some major cities of India viz., Amritsar, Bihar (Darbhanga, Katihar, Muzaffarpur, Narkatiaganj, Patliputra, Raxaul & Saharsa), Dehradun, Delhi (Anand Vihar), Guwahati, Gujarat (Ahmedabad & Porbandar), Howrah (Kolkata), Jammu, Mumbai (Bandra & LTT) and Uttar Pradesh (Bareilly, Jaipur, Kanpur, Lucknow, Prayagraj & Banaras.

== Nearest airport ==
The nearest airport to Bmki station are

- Lok Nayak Jayaprakash Airport, Patna
- Birsa Munda Airport, Ranchi 477 kilometres (296 mi)
- Gaya Airport 268 kilometres (167 mi)
- Gorakhpur Airport, 220 km
- Motihari airport approx. 35 km

== Historical background ==
It holds many historical references such as the start of the Champaran Satyagraha, in April 1917, on the request of Raj Kumar Shukla, for which Mahatma Gandhi went to Champaran and started the Satyagraha Movement against the cultivation of Neel (Indigo), in the Champaran district of Bihar, India, during the period of the British Raj. It was the first Satyagraha Movement, inspired by Mahatma Gandhi and a major revolt in the Indian independence movement. Jab Neel ka Daag Mita: Champaran 1917, by author Pushyamitra expresses such events about the plight, Bihar farmers faced and the fight towards freedom which Bapu lead.

Another important Satyagraha just after this revolt was Kheda Satyagraha of 1918, which was also here for the first time, Mahatma Gandhi was first addressed as Bapu & Mahatma.

Due to these movements, the station name changed from Motihari railway station to Bapudham Motihari railway station (Bapudham: Land of Bapu), as a special tribute, for the contribution towards independence of India by the Father of the Nation, Mahatma Gandhi.

== Ranking ==
As per Station Superintendent Rakesh Kumar Tripathi, it was ranked 264th in the year 2018. And was again ranked 23rd for the overall cleanliness, among the list of the top 100 stations, including the new stations of East-Central Railway, in October 2019. Rajesh Kumar, Chief Public Relations Officer of East Central Railway Hajipur, said that it has ranked 9th among the top 10 stations, which have improved rapidly in the whole country.

It has also been included in the list of top 25 railway stations in the India, released by Railway Minister Piyush Goyal, for the ranking of clean and green stations in New Delhi, to mark the 150th birth anniversary of Mahatma Gandhi.
