= Darbhanga–Jalandhar City Antyodaya Express =

Darbhanga Junction – Jalandhar City Junction Antyodaya SF Express

Overview
- Service type: Antyodaya Express
- First service: 15 May 2018; 8 years ago
- Current operator: East Central Railways

Route
- Termini: Jalandhar City (JUC); Darbhanga (DBG)
- Stops: 14
- Distance travelled: 1,397 km (868 mi)
- Average journey time: 25h 45m
- Service frequency: Weekly (Note: Runs once in a week for every direction)
- Train number: 22551 / 22552

On-board services
- Class: Unreserved
- Seating arrangements: Yes
- Sleeping arrangements: No
- Catering facilities: No
- Baggage facilities: Available

Technical
- Rolling stock: LHB-Antyodaya
- Track gauge: 1,676 mm (5 ft 6 in)
- Operating speed: 67 km/h (42 mph) average including halts

The 22551 / 22552 Darbhanga–Jalandhar City Antyodaya SF Express is an Superfast Express train belonging to East Central Railway zone that runs between Darbhanga and Jalandhar City Junction. It is being operated with 22551/22552 train numbers on a weekly basis.

== Loco link ==
Both trains are hauled by Howda based WAP-4 / WAP-7 locomotive on its entire journey.

== Service ==
- 22551/Darbhanga–Jalandhar City Antyodaya Express has an average speed of 67 km/h and covers 1,397 kilometres (868 mi) in 25 hours 45 minutes.
- 25552/Jalandhar City–Darbhanga Antyodaya Express has an average speed of 65 km/h and covers 1,397 kilometres (868 mi) in 25 hours 30 minutes.

== Coach composition ==
The trains are completely general coach trains designed by Indian Railways with features of LED screen display to show information about stations, train speed, etc. Vending machines for water are available. Bio-toilets in compartments as well as CCTV cameras and mobile charging points and toilet occupancy indicators.

== Route & halts ==
- Darbhanga Junction
- Sitamarhi Junction
- Raxaul Junction
- Sagauli Junction
- Bettiah
- Narkatiaganj Junction
- Gorakhpur Junction
- Sitapur Cantonment
- Bareilly Junction
- Moradabad Junction
- Laksar Junction
- Saharanpur Junction
- Ambala Cantonment Junction
- Sahnewal
- Ludhiana Junction
- Jalandhar City

== Rake sharing ==
The train shares its rake with 15551/15552 Darbhanga–Varanasi City Antyodaya Express.

== See also ==
- Antyodaya Express
- Darbhanga Junction railway station
- Jalandhar City Junction railway station
- Bandra Terminus–Gorakhpur Antyodaya Express
