= Muzaffarpur–Anand Vihar Garib Rath Express =

Train in India

Anand Vihar Terminal – Muzaffarpur Junction Garib Rath Express
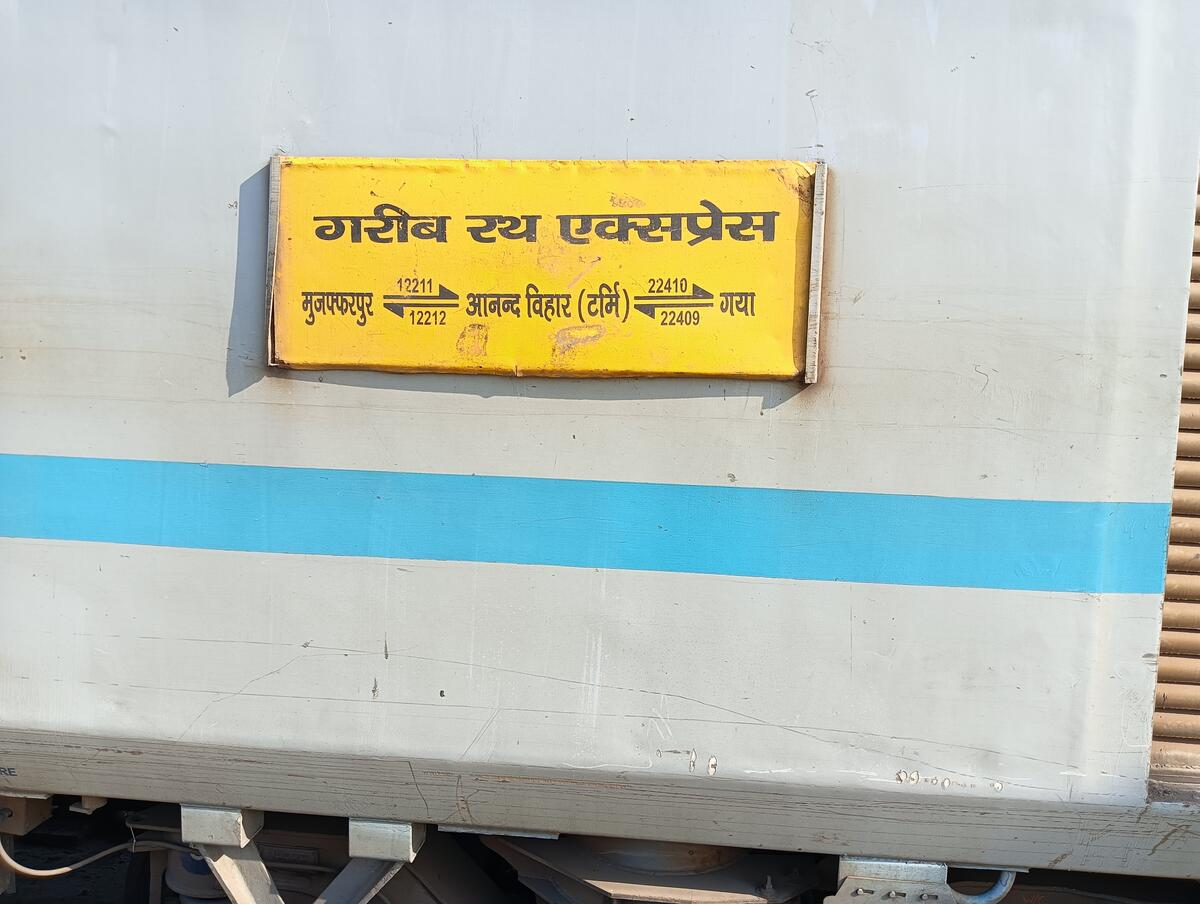
- ANVT-MFP Train Board

Overview
- Service type: Superfast Express, Garib Rath Express
- First service: 6 July 2011
- Current operator: Northern Railways

Route
- Termini: Anand Vihar Terminal (ANVT); Muzaffarpur Junction (MFP)
- Stops: 10
- Distance travelled: 1,057 km (657 mi)
- Average journey time: 21 hours 15 mins
- Service frequency: Weekly
- Train number: 12212 / 12211

On-board services
- Class: AC 3 Economy tier
- Seating arrangements: No
- Sleeping arrangements: Yes
- Auto-rack arrangements: Yes
- Catering facilities: On-board catering E-catering
- Baggage facilities: Storage space under berth

Technical
- Rolling stock: LHB
- Track gauge: 1,676 mm (5 ft 6 in)
- Electrification: Yes
- Operating speed: 49.88 km/h (31 mph)

The 12212 / 12211 Anand Vihar–Muzaffarpur Junction Garib Rath Express is a Superfast Express train of the Garib Rath series belonging to Indian Railways – Northern Railway zone that runs between Anand Vihar Terminal and Muzaffarpur Junction in India.

It operates as train number 12212 from Anand Vihar Terminal to Muzaffarpur Junction and as train number 12211 in the reverse direction, serving the states of Delhi, Uttar Pradesh & Bihar.

It is part of the Garib Rath Express series launched by the former railway minister of India, Mr. Laloo Prasad Yadav.

== Schedule ==
12211 / 12212 Muzaffarpur–Anand Vihar Garib Rath Schedule
Train Type	Garib Rath Express
Distance	1059 km (12211) / 1060 km (12212)
Average Speed	~53 km/h
Journey Time (MFP → ANVT)	20 hrs 05 min
Journey Time (ANVT → MFP)	20 hrs 30 min
Classes Available	3E
Operating Days	Weekly
Operator	East Central Railway

== Coaches ==
Coach Composition of 12211/12212 Muzaffarpur – Anand Vihar Terminal Garib Rath Express
Coach No.	Type	Description
1	EOG	End-on-Generator
2–21	3E	M1, M2, M3, M4, M5, M6, M7, M8, M9, M10, M11, M12, M13, M14, M15, M16, M17, M18, M19, M20
22	EOG	End-on-Generator

- Primary Maintenance - Muzaffarpur Coaching Depot

== Route & halts ==
12211 Muzaffarpur–Anand Vihar Garib Rath and 12212 Anand Vihar–Muzaffarpur Garib Rath Schedule
Sr.	12211 MFP–ANVT				12212 ANVT–MFP			
Sr.	Station	Day	Arr.	Dep.	Station	Day	Arr.	Dep.
1	Muzaffarpur Junction	1	—	15:15	Anand Vihar Terminal	1	—	20:55
2	Chakia	1	16:11	16:13	Moradabad	1	23:35	23:40
3	Bapudham Motihari	1	16:38	16:40	Bareilly Junction	2	01:00	01:02
4	Sagauli Junction	1	17:08	17:10	Shahjahanpur	2	02:11	02:13
5	Bettiah	1	17:28	17:30	Lucknow Junction	2	05:15	05:25
6	Narkatiaganj Junction	1	18:20	18:25	Gonda Junction	2	08:05	08:10
7	Bagaha	1	19:04	19:07	Basti	2	09:17	09:20
8	Gorakhpur Junction	1	22:12	22:20	Gorakhpur Junction	2	10:45	10:55
9	Basti	1	23:51	23:54	Bagaha	2	14:11	14:14
10	Gonda Junction	2	01:40	01:50	Narkatiaganj Junction	2	15:05	15:10
11	Lucknow Junction	2	04:15	04:25	Bettiah	2	15:42	15:45
12	Shahjahanpur	2	06:51	06:53	Sagauli Junction	2	16:06	16:08
13	Bareilly Junction	2	07:50	07:55	Bapudham Motihari	2	16:24	16:27
14	Moradabad	2	09:08	09:13	Chakia	2	16:55	

== Traction ==
Both trains are hauled by a Ghaziabad Electric Loco Shed-based WAP-5 locomotive on its entire journey.
