= Champaran Humsafar Express =

Superfast express train in India

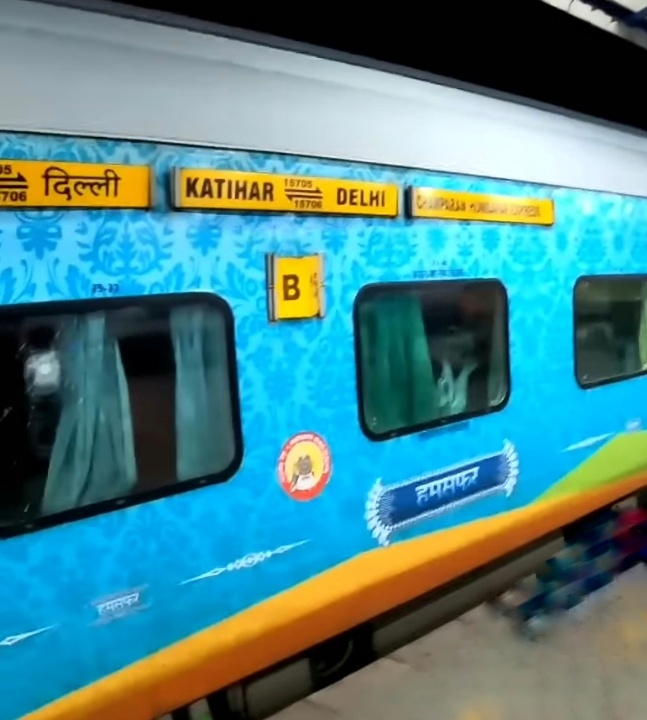
- Champaran Humsafar Express At Etawah Junction railway station

Overview
- Service type: Humsafar Express
- First service: 10 April 2018; 7 years ago
- Current operator: Northeast Frontier Railways

Route
- Termini: Katihar Junction (KIR); Old Delhi (DLI)
- Stops: 12
- Distance travelled: 1,473 km (915 mi)
- Average journey time: 29h 50m
- Service frequency: Bi - Weekly
- Train number: 15705 / 15706

On-board services
- Class: AC 3 tier
- Seating arrangements: No
- Sleeping arrangements: Yes
- Catering facilities: Available
- Observation facilities: Large windows
- Baggage facilities: Yes

Technical
- Rolling stock: LHB Humsafar
- Track gauge: 1,676 mm (5 ft 6 in)
- Operating speed: 49 km/h (30 mph) Avg. Speed

The 15705 / 15706 Champaran Humsafar Express is a superfast premium train of Indian Railways operated by the Northeast Frontier Railway zone. It connects Katihar Junction in Bihar with Old Delhi (Delhi Junction) in the National Capital Region.

== Overview ==
The Champaran Humsafar Express (15705/15706) operated its inaugural run on 10 April 2018 as the 05705 Katihar–Delhi Champaran Humsafar Special. The train was inaugurated on the same day by the Prime Minister of India, Narendra Modi.

- Following the inaugural run, regular commercial operations were introduced as a bi-weekly service. The 15706 Delhi Junction–Katihar Champaran Humsafar Express commenced regular service from Delhi Junction on 13 April 2018, while the 15705 Katihar–Delhi Junction Champaran Humsafar Express commenced regular service from Katihar on 16 April 2018.
- Initial Route and Halts - In its initial schedule, the train provided halts at Purnea, Dauram Madhepura, Saharsa, Khagaria, Samastipur, Muzaffarpur, Bapudham Motihari, Bettiah, Narkatiaganj, Gorakhpur, Naugarh, Balrampur, Gonda, Lucknow, and Kanpur Central in both directions.
- Route Modification - Subsequently, the route of the Champaran Humsafar Express was modified, and halts at Dauram Madhepura, Purnea, and Saharsa were withdrawn. After the route rationalisation, the train began operating via the Katihar – Naugachia – Khagaria – Barauni–Samastipur - Muzaffarpur section.

== Schedule ==
Katihar–Delhi Champaran Humsafar Express Schedule
Train Type	Humsafar Express
Distance	~1300 km
Average Speed	~48 km/h
Journey Time (KIR → DLI)	~27 hrs 35 min
Journey Time (DLI → KIR)	~26 hrs 00 min
Classes Available	3A, SL, AC-2, AC-1, GN & 3E
Catering	On-board catering included
Operating Days	Bi - Weekly
Operator	Northeast Frontier Railway zone

== Route and halts ==
15705 Katihar–Delhi Champaran Humsafar and 15706 Delhi–Katihar Champaran Humsafar
15705 KIR → DLI				15706 DLI → KIR			
Station	Arr.	Dep.	Day	Station	Arr.	Dep.	Day
Katihar Junction	—	08:10	1	Delhi Junction	—	16:35	1
Naugachia	08:53	08:55	1	Aligarh Junction	18:08	18:10	1
Khagaria Junction	10:05	10:10	1	Kanpur Central	21:35	21:40	1
Samastipur Junction	11:40	11:45	1	Lucknow Junction	23:10	23:20	1
Muzaffarpur Junction	12:45	12:50	1	Gonda Junction	01:25	01:35	2
Chakia	13:40	13:42	1	Balrampur	02:25	02:27	2
Bapudham Motihari	14:14	14:16	1	Tulsipur	02:53	02:55	2
Sagauli Junction	14:42	14:44	1	Siddharth Nagar	03:59	04:01	2
Bettiah	15:03	15:05	1	Gorakhpur Junction	06:15	06:25	2
Narkatiaganj Junction	16:15	16:20	1	Siswa Bazar	07:25	07:27	2
Bagaha	17:11	17:13	1	Bagaha	08:22	08:24	2
Siswa Bazar	18:38	18:40	1	Narkatiaganj Junction	09:10	09:15	2
Gorakhpur Junction	20:25	20:35	1	Bettiah	09:43	09:45	2
Siddharth Nagar	22:07	22:09	1	Sagauli Junction	09:59	10:01	2
Tulsipur	23:07	23:09	1	Bapudham Motihari	10:18	10:21	2
Balrampur	23:38	23:40	1	Chakia	10:58	11:00	2
Gonda Junction	01:10	01:15	2	Muzaffarpur Junction	12:05	12:10	2
Lucknow Junction	04:00	04:10	2	Samastipur Junction	13:10	13:15	2
Kanpur Central	06:05	06:10	2	Khagaria Junction	15:43	15:45	2
Aligarh Junction	09:20	09:22	2	Naugachia	16:41	16:43	2
Delhi Junction	11:45	—	2	Katihar Junction	18:35	—	2

== Coach composition ==
Category	Coaches	Total
Sleeper cum Luggage Rake (SLRD) (Divyangjan)	SLRD	1
General Unreserved (GEN)	GEN1, GEN2, GEN3, GEN4	4
Sleeper Class (SL)	S1, S2, S3, S4, S5, S6	6
Pantry Car (PC)	PC	1
AC 3 Economy (3E)	M1	1
AC 3 Tier (3A)	B1, B2, B3, B4, B5	5
AC 2 Tier (2A)	A1, A2	2
AC First Class (1A)	H1	1
Luggage/Parcel Rake (LPR)	LPR	1
Total Coaches		22

- Primary Maintenance – Katihar CD

== See also ==
- Sapt Kranti Express
- Satyagrah Express
- Amrapali Express
- Avadh Express
- Muzaffarpur–Anand Vihar Garib Rath Express
- Humsafar Express
