= Champaran Satyagrah Express =

Train in India

Overview
- Service type: Express
- Locale: Bihar, Uttar Pradesh & Delhi
- First service: 10 June 2016; 10 years ago
- Current operator: Northern Railway

Route
- Termini: Bapudham Motihari (BMKI); Anand Vihar Terminal (ANVT)
- Stops: 13
- Distance travelled: 964 km (599 mi)
- Average journey time: 13 hrs 13 mins
- Service frequency: Weekly. (Note: Runs two day in a week for every direction.)
- Train number: 14009 / 14010

On-board services
- Classes: AC First Class, AC 2 Tier, AC 3 Tier, Sleeper Class, General Unreserved
- Seating arrangements: Yes
- Sleeping arrangements: Yes
- Catering facilities: On-board catering, E-catering
- Observation facilities: Large windows
- Baggage facilities: No
- Other facilities: Below the seats

Technical
- Rolling stock: LHB coach
- Track gauge: 1,676 mm (5 ft 6 in)
- Operating speed: 47 km/h (29 mph) average including halts.

The 14009 / 14010 Champaran Satyagrah Express is an express train belonging to Northern Railway zone that runs between Bapudham Motihari and Anand Vihar Terminal in India. It is currently being operated with 14009/14010 train numbers on a weekly basis.

== Service ==
The 14009/Champaran Satyagrah Express has an average speed of 47 km/h and covers 964 km in 20h 40m. The 14010/Champaran Satyagrah Express has an average speed of 48 km/h and covers 964 km in 20h 15m.

== Route and halts ==
The important halts of the train are:

- Bapudham Motihari
- Sagauli Junction
- Bettiah
- Narkatiaganj Junction
- Kaptanganj Junction
- Gorakhpur Junction
- Basti
- Gonda Junction
- Sitapur Junction
- Chandausi Junction
- Moradabad Junction
- Hapur Junction
- Ghaziabad Junction
- Anand Vihar Terminal.

== Coach composition ==
The train has LHB rakes with a maximum speed of 160 km/h. The train consists of 16 coaches:

- 1 AC III Tier
- 7 Sleeper coaches
- 6 General
- 2 Seating cum Luggage Rake

== Traction ==
Both trains are hauled by a Ghaziabad Loco Shed-based WAP-5 electric locomotive from Motihari to Delhi and vice versa.

== Rake sharing ==
The train shares its rake with 12444/12443 Haldia–Anand Vihar Terminal Superfast Express.

== See also ==
- Bapudham Motihari railway station
- Anand Vihar Terminal railway station
- Satyagrah Express
- Haldia–Anand Vihar Terminal Superfast Express
