= Patliputra–Narkatiaganj Intercity Express =

Train in India

Intercity Express

Overview
- Service type: Express
- Current operator: North Eastern Railway zone

Route
- Termini: Patliputra Junction; Narkatiaganj Junction
- Stops: 12
- Distance travelled: 370 km (230 mi)
- Average journey time: 11 hours 55 mins
- Service frequency: six days in a week
- Train number: 25201 / 25202

On-board services
- Class: general unreserved
- Seating arrangements: Yes
- Sleeping arrangements: Yes
- Catering facilities: No

Technical
- Rolling stock: Standard Indian Railways Coaches
- Track gauge: 1,676 mm (5 ft 6 in)
- Operating speed: 32.5 km/h (20 mph)
Route map
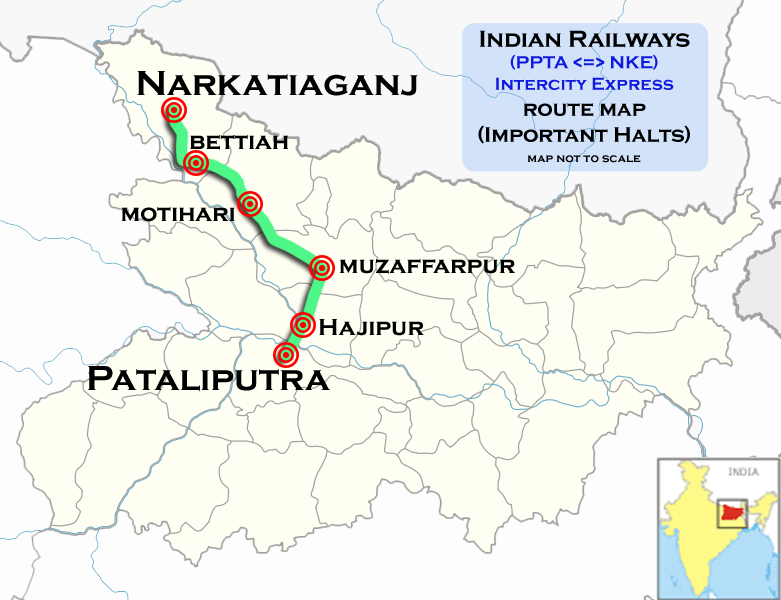

The 25201 / 02 Intercity Express is an Express train belonging to North Eastern Railway zone that runs between Patliputra Junction and Narkatiaganj Junction in India.

It operates as train number 25201 from Patliputra Junction to Narkatiaganj Junction and as train number 25202 in the reverse direction serving the state of Bihar.

== Coaches ==
The 25201 / 02 Intercity Express has 13 general unreserved & two SLR (seating with luggage rake) coaches . It does not carry a pantry car coach.

As is customary with most train services in India, coach composition may be amended at the discretion of Indian Railways depending on demand.

== Service ==
The 25201 Patliputra Junction - Narkatiaganj Junction Intercity Express covers the distance of 235 km (146 mi) in 7 hours 35 mins (31 km/h) and in 6 hours 25 mins as the 25202 Narkatiaganj Junction - Patliputra Junction Intercity Express (37 km/h).

As the average speed of the train is lower than 55 km/h (34 mph), as per railway rules, its fare doesn't includes a Superfast surcharge.

== Routing ==
The 25201 / 02 Intercity Express runs from Patliputra Junction via Sonpur Junction, Muzaffarpur Junction, Mehsi railway station, Sagauli Junction to Narkatiaganj Junction.

== Traction ==
As the route is going to electrification, a Samastipur Junction based WDM-3A diesel locomotive pulls the train to its destination.

== See also ==
- Patliputra Junction railway station
- Narkatiaganj Junction railway station
- Muzaffarpur - Narkatiaganj Express
