= Kamakhya–Anand Vihar Terminal North East Express =

Passenger train in India

North East Express
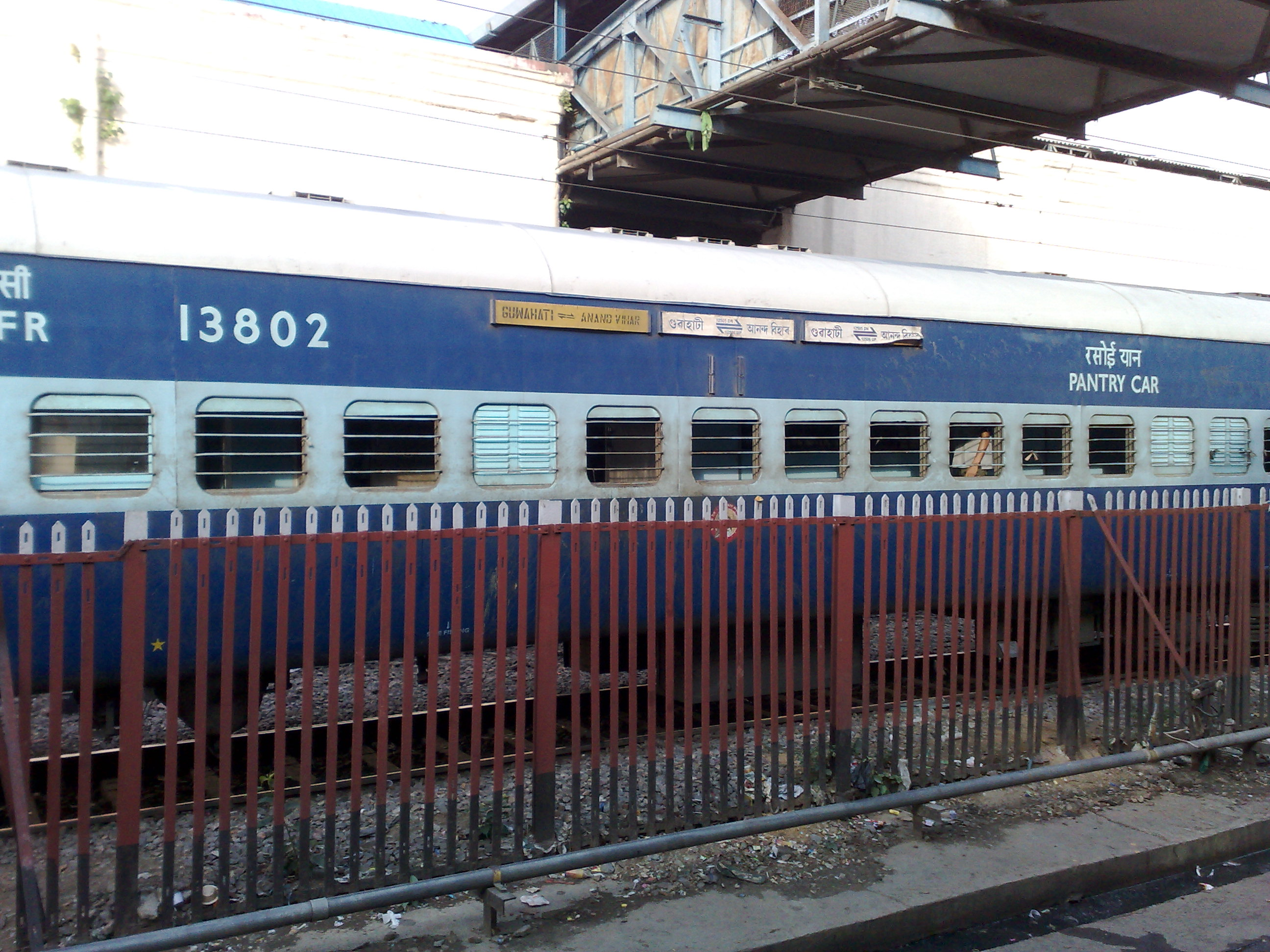

Overview
- Service type: Express
- First service: 1 April 1986; 40 years ago
- Current operator: North East Frontier Railways

Route
- Termini: Kamakhya Junction (KYQ); Anand Vihar Terminal (ANVT)
- Stops: 29
- Distance travelled: 1,866 km (1,159 mi)
- Average journey time: 34 hours
- Service frequency: Daily
- Train number: 12505 / 12506

On-board services
- Classes: AC 2 tier, AC 3 tier, Sleeper Class, General Unreserved
- Seating arrangements: Yes
- Sleeping arrangements: Yes
- Catering facilities: Pantry Car Coach attached
- Observation facilities: Large windows

Technical
- Rolling stock: LHB coach
- Track gauge: 1,676 mm (5 ft 6 in)
- Operating speed: 55.37 km/h (34 mph), including halts
Route map
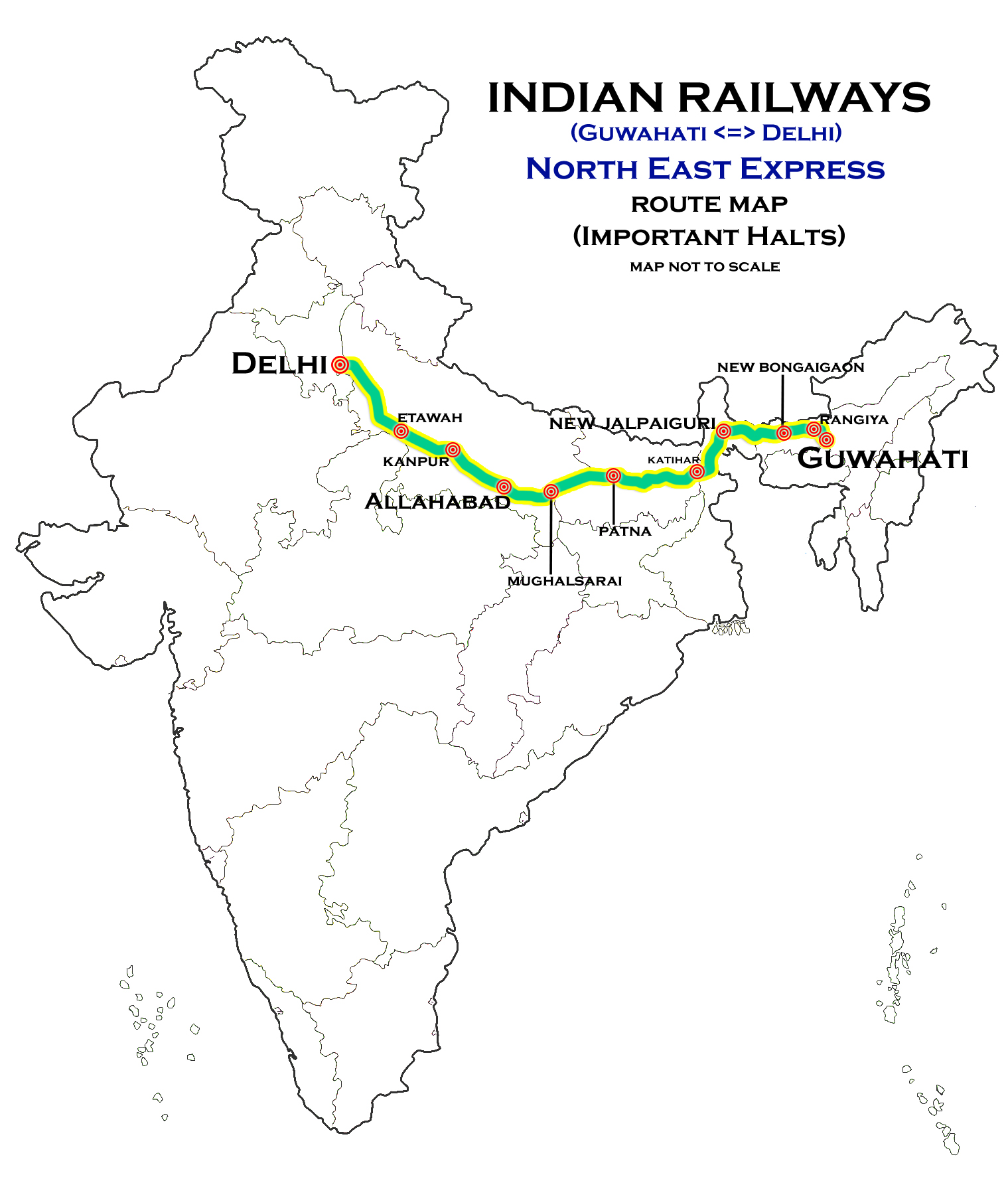

Kamakhya Anand Vihar Terminal Express also known as North East Express is an express train of Indian Railways – Northeast Frontier Railway zone that runs between Guwahati and Anand Vihar Terminal in India.

It operates as train number 12505 from Guwahati to Anand Vihar Terminal and as train number 12506 in the reverse direction serving the states of Assam, West Bengal, Bihar, Uttar Pradesh & Delhi.

== Coaches ==
The 12505 / 06 Kamakhya Anand Vihar Terminal North East Express presently has 1 AC 2 tier, 3 AC 3 tier, 14 Sleeper Class, 4 General Unreserved, 2 SLR (Seating cum Luggage Rake) coaches. In addition, it carries a Pantry car coach.

As is customary with most train services in India, Coach Composition may be amended at the discretion of Indian Railways depending on demand.

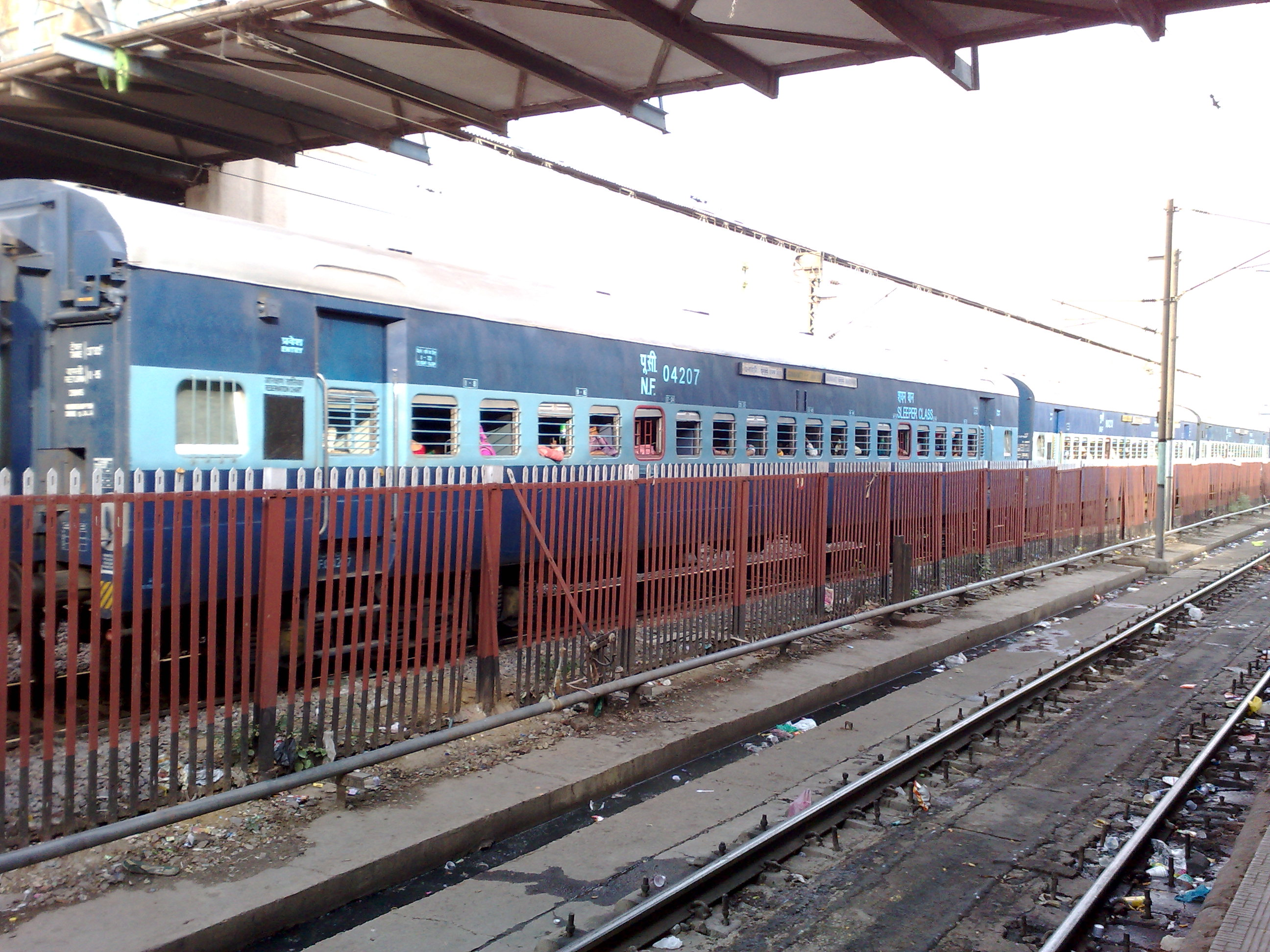
12506 North East Express – Sleeper Class coach

== Speed ==
The train travels at an average speed of 55 km/h (34 mph).

== Route ==
=== Delhi to Guwahati ===
==== List of stops on the North East Express from Delhi to Guwahati ====
State	Town/City	Station	Distance (km)
Delhi	Delhi	Anand Vihar Terminal	0
Uttar Pradesh	Aligarh	Aligarh Junction	126
Uttar Pradesh	Tundla	Tundla Junction	204
Uttar Pradesh	Etawah	Etawah Junction	296
Uttar Pradesh	Kanpur	Kanpur Central	435
Uttar Pradesh	Fatehpur	Fatehpur	513
Uttar Pradesh	Prayagraj	Prayagraj Junction	629
Uttar Pradesh	Pandit Deen Dayal Upadhyaya Nagar	Pandit Deen Dayal Upadhyaya Junction	778
Bihar	Buxar	Buxar	872
Bihar	Arrah	Ara Junction	941
Bihar	Danapur	Danapur	980
Bihar	Patna	Patliputra Junction	986
Bihar	Barauni	Barauni Junction	1095
Bihar	Begusarai	Begusarai	1110
Bihar	Khagaria	Khagaria Junction	1150
Bihar	Mansi	Mansi Junction	1159
Bihar	Naugachia	Naugachia	1217
Bihar	Katihar	Katihar Junction	1274
Bihar	Barsoi	Barsoi Junction	1313
Bihar	Kishanganj	Kishanganj	1371
West Bengal	Siliguri	New Jalpaiguri Junction	1458
West Bengal	Jalpaiguri	Jalpaiguri Road	1491
West Bengal	Cooch Behar	New Cooch Behar Junction	1584
West Bengal	Alipurduar	New Alipurduar	1603
Assam	Gossaigaon	Gossaigaon Hat	1645
Assam	Kokrajhar	Kokrajhar	1681
Assam	Bongaigaon	New Bongaigaon Junction	1709
Assam	Bijni	Bijni	1724
Assam	Barpeta	Barpeta Road	1751
Assam	Rangia	Rangiya Junction	1819
Assam	Kamalpur	Kendukona	1825
Assam	Guwahati	Kamakhya Junction	1856

=== Guwahati to Delhi ===
==== List of stops on the North East Express from Guwahati to Delhi ====
State	Town/City	Station	Distance (km)
Assam	Maligaon	Kamakhya Junction	0
Assam	Kamalpur	Kendukona	31
Assam	Rangia	Rangiya Junction	48
Assam	Barpeta	Barpeta Road	105
Assam	Bijni	Bijni	133
Assam	Bongaigaon	New Bongaigaon Junction	157
Assam	Kokrajhar	Kokrajhar	185
Assam	Gossaigaon	Gossaigaon Hat	210
West Bengal	Alipurduar	New Alipurduar	264
West Bengal	Cooch Behar	New Cooch Behar Junction	283
West Bengal	Jalpaiguri	Jalpaiguri Road	375
West Bengal	Siliguri	New Jalpaiguri Junction	409
Bihar	Kishanganj	Kishanganj	496
Bihar	Barsoi	Barsoi Junction	553
Bihar	Katihar	Katihar Junction	593
Bihar	Naugachia	Naugachia	650
Bihar	Mansi	Mansi Junction	708
Bihar	Khagaria	Khagaria Junction	716
Bihar	Begusarai	Begusarai	757
Bihar	Barauni	Barauni Junction	772
Bihar	Patna	Patliputra Junction	880
Bihar	Danapur	Danapur	886
Bihar	Arrah	Ara Junction	926
Bihar	Buxar	Buxar	994
Uttar Pradesh	Pandit Deen Dayal Upadhyaya Nagar	Pandit Deen Dayal Upadhyaya Junction	1088
Uttar Pradesh	Prayagraj	Prayagraj Junction	1237
Uttar Pradesh	Fatehpur	Fatehpur	1354
Uttar Pradesh	Kanpur	Kanpur Central	1432
Uttar Pradesh	Etawah	Etawah Junction	1571
Uttar Pradesh	Tundla	Tundla Junction	1663
Uttar Pradesh	Aligarh	Aligarh Junction	1741
Uttar Pradesh	Ghaziabad	Ghaziabad Junction	1844
Delhi	Delhi	Anand Vihar Terminal	1856
