= Harinagar railway station =

Railway station in Bihar, India

Harinagar

General information
- Location: Dharshyam, Ramnagar, West Champaran district, Bihar; India
- Coordinates: 27°09′24″N 84°19′28″E
- Elevation: 97 m (318 ft)
- System: Passenger train station
- Owner: Indian Railways
- Operator: East Central Railway
- Line: Muzaffarpur–Gorakhpur main line
- Platforms: 1
- Tracks: 2

Construction
- Structure type: Standard (on ground station)

Other information
- Status: Active
- Station code: HIR
- Zone(s): East Central Railway zone
- Division(s): Samastipur

History
- Opened: 1930s

Services
Preceding station	Indian Railways	Following station
Bhairoganj towards ?	East Central Railway zone Muzaffarpur–Gorakhpur main line	Chamua towards ?
Location

Harinagar railway station (station code: HIR), is a railway station on Muzaffarpur–Gorakhpur main line under the Samastipur railway division of East Central Railway zone. The station is situated at Dharshyam, Ramnagar in West Champaran district of the Indian state of Bihar.
