= Haldia–Anand Vihar Terminal Superfast Express =

Anand Vihar Haldia Superfast Express
Overview
- Service type: Superfast Express
- First service: 23 April 2013
- Current operator: Northern Railways

Route
- Termini: Anand Vihar Terminal; Haldia
- Stops: 10
- Distance travelled: 1,576 km (979 mi)
- Average journey time: 25 hours 20 mins as 12444 Anand Vihar–Haldia Superfast Express, 31 hours 05 mins as 12443 Haldia–Anand Vihar Superfast Express.
- Service frequency: Once a week. 12444 Anand Vihar–Haldia Superfast Express – Tuesday, 12443 Haldia–Anand Vihar Superfast Express – Thursday.
- Train number: 12444 / 43

On-board services
- Classes: AC 3 tier, Sleeper class, General Unreserved
- Seating arrangements: Yes
- Sleeping arrangements: Yes
- Catering facilities: No
- Observation facilities: LHB coach

Technical
- Rolling stock: LHB coach
- Track gauge: 1,676 mm (5 ft 6 in)
- Electrification: Yes
- Operating speed: 110 km/h (68 mph) maximum, 59.85 km/h (37 mph), including halts.

The 12444 / 43 Anand Vihar–Haldia Superfast Express is a Superfast Express train belonging to Indian Railways – Northern Railway zone that runs between Anand Vihar Terminal and Haldia in India.

It operates as train number 12444 from Anand Vihar Terminal to Haldia and as train number 12443 in the reverse direction, serving the states of Delhi, Uttar Pradesh, Bihar, Jharkhand and West Bengal.

== Coaches ==
The 12444 / 43 Anand Vihar–Haldia Superfast Express has 1 AC 3 tier, 6 Sleeper class, 6 General Unreserved and 2 SLR (Seating cum Luggage Rake) coaches. It does not carry a pantry car .

As is customary with most train services in India, coach composition may be amended at the discretion of Indian Railways depending on demand.

== Service ==
The 12444 Anand Vihar–Haldia Superfast Express covers the distance of 1,576 km (979 mi) in 25 hours 20 mins (62.21 km/h) and in 27 hours 20 mins as 12443 Haldia–Anand Vihar Superfast Express (57.66 km/h).

As the average speed of the train is above 55 km/h (34 mph), as per Indian Railways rules, its fare includes a Superfast surcharge.

== Routeing ==
The 12444 / 43 Anand Vihar–Haldia Superfast Express runs from

- Anand Vihar Terminalvia
- Ghaziabad,
- Kanpur Central,
- Allahabad Junction,
- Mughalsarai Junction,
- Gaya Junction,
- Gomoh Junction,
- Purulia Junction,
- Tatanagar Junction,
- Kharagpur Junction,
- Panskura Junction,
- Tamluk Junction,
- Haldia

== Traction ==
As the entire route is fully electrified, a Ghaziabad-based WAP-1 or WAP-4 powers the train for its entire journey.

== Operation ==
12444 Anand Vihar–Haldia Superfast Express runs from Anand Vihar Terminal every Tuesday reaching Haldia the next day .i.e. Wednesday.

12443 Haldia–Anand Vihar Superfast Express runs from Haldia every Thursday reaching Anand Vihar Terminal the next day .i.e. Friday.
