= Narkatiaganj Junction railway station =

Railway station in West Champaran, Bihar, India

Narkatiaganj Junction
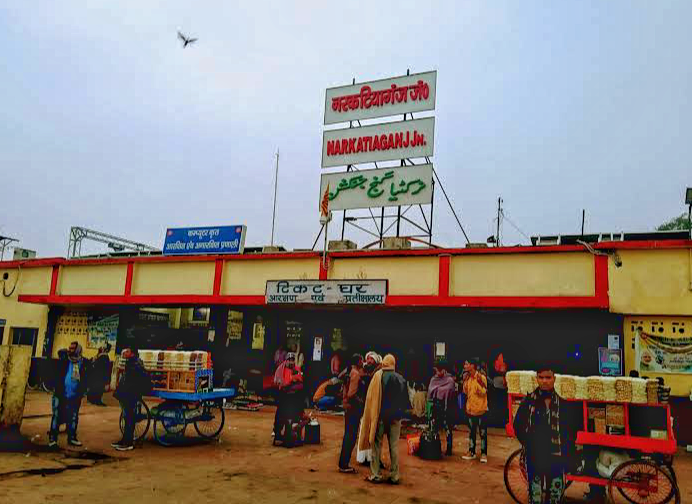
- Narkatiaganj junction Railway station

General information
- Location: Narkatiaganj, West Champaran district, Bihar; India
- Coordinates: 27.1050°N 84.4631°E
- Elevation: 54 metres (177 ft)
- System: Indian Railways station
- Lines: Muzaffarpur–Gorakhpur main line Narkatiaganj–Bhikhna Thori line Narkatiaganj–Darbhanga line
- Platforms: 5
- Tracks: 8

Construction
- Structure type: Standard station

Other information
- Status: Functioning
- Station code: NKE
- Zone(s): East Central Railway zone
- Division(s): Samastipur

History
- Former names: East Indian Railway
Location
- Location within Bihar Location within India

Narkatiaganj Junction (station code: NKE), is a railway station in the Samastipur railway division of East Central Railway. It is one of the busiest and important junctions of Samastipur division. The station is located in the town of Narkatiaganj, a sub-division of West Champaran district in the Indian state of Bihar.

== Platforms ==
The four platforms are accessible only through a level-crossing side on platform no. 1 & 2 where an office for station officials and facilities for ticket and waiting are situated. The platforms are interconnected with foot overbridges (FOB). Platforms 1, 2 3 & 4 are also connected to FOB, platform no 5 is lower-level platform.

== Trains ==
Samastipur is the divisional headquarters; several local passenger trains and express trains run from Narkatiaganj to neighbouring destinations. List of some important trains that stop at Narkatiaganj:

Number	Train Name
15567/8	Bapudham Motihari - Anand Vihar Terminal Amrit Bharat Express (BMKI - ANVT)
12557/8	Sapt Kranti Express (MFP-ANVT)
15705/6	Champaran Humsafar Express (KIR-DLI)
15273/4	Satyagrah Express (RXL-ANVT)
19269/70	Porbandar–Muzaffarpur Express (PBR-MFP) VIA-DLI
12211/2	Muzaffarpur–Anand Vihar Garib Rath Express (ANVT-MFP)
14009/10	Champaran Satyagrah Express (ANVT-BMKI)
19037/38	Bandra Terminus–Barauni Avadh Express (BDTS-BJU)
15529/30	Saharsa–Anand Vihar Terminal Jan Sadharan Express (SHC-ANVT)
15655/6	Kamakhya–Shri Mata Vaishno Devi Katra Express (KYQ-SVDK)
15653/4	Amarnath Express (GHY-JAT)
15001/2	Rapti Ganga Express (MFP-DDN)
22551/2	Darbhanga–Jalandhar City Antyodaya Express (DBG-JUC)
15211/2	Jan Nayak Express (DBG-ASR)
15215/6	Muzaffarpur–Narkatiaganj Express (MFP-NKE)
25201/2	Patliputra–Narkatiaganj Intercity Express (PPTA-NKE)
15237/8	Darbhanga–Ajmer Express* (DBG-AII)
26501/2	Vande Bharat Express (GKP-PPTA)

*Pending

- Pair of passenger train run from Gorakhpur to Narkatiaganj
- Pair of MEMU passenger train run from Muzaffarpur to Narkatiaganj
- Pair of trains run from Raxaul to Narkatiaganj

Doubling MFP-NKE-PNYA undergoing project.

== Connectivity ==
The nearest airport to Narkatiaganj Junction is Gorakhpur Airport, 136 kilometres (85 mi) distance. Patna airport is an alternative airport, situated from Narkatiaganj to 240 kilometres (150 mi) distance.

== See also ==
- Bhikhna Thori railway station
