= Chakia railway station =

Railway Station in Bihar, India

Chakia Bara Chakia

General information
- Location: Station Road, Chakia East Champaran district, Bihar; India
- Coordinates: 26°25′02″N 85°02′47″E
- Elevation: 66 m (217 ft)
- System: Passenger & Express train station
- Owner: Indian Railways
- Operator: East Central Railway
- Line: Muzaffarpur–Gorakhpur main line
- Platforms: 1
- Tracks: 4

Construction
- Structure type: Standard (on ground station)
- Parking: Yes

Other information
- Status: Active
- Station code: CAA
- Zone(s): East Central Railway zone
- Division(s): Samastipur

History
- Opened: 1930s
- Rebuilt: 2024

Services
Preceding station	Indian Railways	Following station
Kuria towards ?	East Central Railway zone Muzaffarpur–Gorakhpur main line	Harpur Nag Halt towards ?
Location

Chakia Railway Station (station code: CAA), is a railway station on Muzaffarpur–Gorakhpur main line under the Samastipur Railway Division of East Central Railway Zone. This is situated at Chakia in East Champaran district of the Indian state of Bihar.
