= Bagaha railway station =

Railway station in Bihar, India

Bagaha

General information
- Location: State Highway 64, Naraipur, Bagaha, West Champaran district, Bihar; India
- Coordinates: 27°07′48″N 84°04′01″E
- Elevation: 93 m (305 ft)
- System: Passenger train station
- Owner: Indian Railways
- Operator: East Central Railway
- Line: Muzaffarpur–Gorakhpur main line
- Platforms: 5
- Tracks: 9( 2 tracks under construction)

Construction
- Structure type: Standard (on ground station)
- Parking: yes

Other information
- Status: Active
- Station code: BUG
- Zone(s): East Central Railway zone
- Division(s): Samastipur

History
- Opened: 1930s

Services
Preceding station	Indian Railways	Following station
Awasani towards ?	East Central Railway zone Muzaffarpur–Gorakhpur main line	Kharpokhra towards ?
Location

Bagaha railway station is a railway station on Muzaffarpur–Gorakhpur main line under the Samastipur railway division of East Central Railway zone. This is situated beside State Highway 64 at Naraipur, Bagaha in West Champaran district of the Indian state of Bihar.
