= Narkatiaganj =

- Town
- Narkatiaganj Bazar

- Location in Bihar, India
- Coordinates: 27.108°N 84.464°E
- Country: India
- State: Bihar
- District: West Champaran
- Elevation: 89 m (292 ft)

Population (2011)
  - Total: 49,507
- Time zone: UTC+5:30 (IST)
- PIN: 845455
- Telephone code: 06253
- Lok Sabha constituency: Valmiki Nagar
- Vidhan Sabha constituency: Narkatiaganj
- Website: westchamparan.bih.nic.in

Narkatiaganj is a town and a notified area in West Champaran district in the Indian state of Bihar. It is a part of Tirhut Division, and situated 122 kilometres (76 mi) northwest of Historical Mehsi and 280 kilometres (170 mi) northwest of capital of the state, Patna.

== Overview ==
Narkatiaganj is a subdivided region in West Champaran district in the Indian state of Bihar. It is situated 280 kilometres (170 mi) northwest of the capital of Patna. Narkatiaganj contains 27 Panchayats. The city is well connected by roads and railways to all major places of Bihar and neighbor states. It is situated on the Barauni–Gorakhpur, Raxaul and Jainagar railway lines.

== Demographics ==
As of 2011 India census, Narkatiaganj had a population of 49,507 in 9083 households. Males constitute 53% of the population and females 43%. Narkatiaganj has an average literacy rate of 65%, lower than the national average of 74%, male literacy is 57.65% and female literacy is 42.34%. 15.7% of the population in Narkatiyaganj is under 6 years of age.

=== According to Narkatiaganj Nagar Parishad ===
As per the 2011 Population Census data, the following are some facts about Narkatiaganj Nagar Parishad.

	Total	Male	Female
Children	7,789	4,067	3,722
Literacy	77.2%	70.7%	58.7%
Scheduled Caste	5,026	2,660	2,366
Scheduled Tribe	332	176	156
Illiterate	17,305	7,708	9,597

== Climate ==
Climate data for Narkatiaganj
Month	Jan	Feb	Mar	Apr	May	Jun	Jul	Aug	Sep	Oct	Nov	Dec	Year
Record high °C (°F)	22 (72)	27.2 (81.0)	31 (88)	37 (99)	34 (93)	36 (97)	33 (91)	34 (93)	33 (91)	33 (91)	30 (86)	25 (77)	37 (99)
Record low °C (°F)	7 (45)	9 (48)	12 (54)	23 (73)	23 (73)	26 (79)	25 (77)	24 (75)	24 (75)	21 (70)	16 (61)	9 (48)	9 (48)

== Notable people ==
- Manoj Bajpai - Indian actor
- Satish Chandra Dubey - Politician
- Vikas Mishra, former Vice-Chancellor, Kurukshetra University
- Bhagirathi Devi - Politician
- Damodar Raao - Music Director

== Places of interest ==
Near Narkatiaganj is the historical Chanaki Garh, which is said to belong to Chanakya, the prime minister of Chandragupta Maurya of the Mauryan dynasty. An Iron Pillar (also known as Ashoka Stambha) representing the history of India and commissioned by Ashoka, is another center of attraction.

== See also ==
- Narkatiaganj Junction
- Narkatiaganj (Vidhan Sabha constituency)
