= Sapt Kranti Express =

Train in India

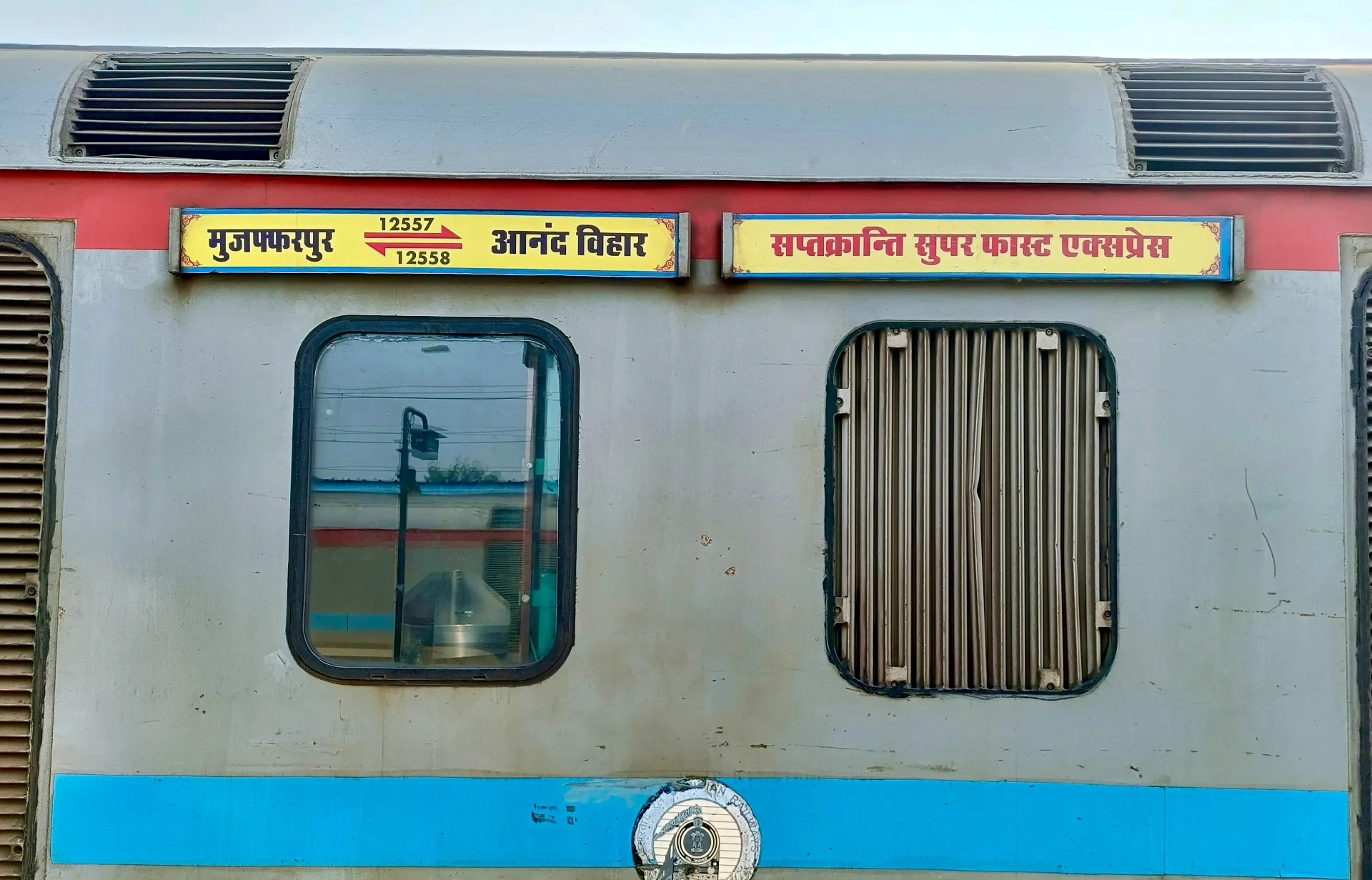
- Sapt Kranti Express train board.

Overview
- Service type: Superfast
- Locale: Bihar, Uttar Pradesh & Delhi
- First service: 1 July 2002; 24 years ago
- Current operator: East Central Railway

Route
- Termini: Muzaffarpur Junction (MFP); Anand Vihar Terminal (ANVT)
- Stops: 19
- Distance travelled: 1,057 km (657 mi)
- Average journey time: 20 Hours
- Service frequency: Daily
- Train number: 12557 / 12558

On-board services
- Classes: AC First Class, AC 2 Tier, AC 3 Tier, Sleeper class, AC 3 Tier Economy, General Unreserved
- Seating arrangements: Yes
- Sleeping arrangements: Yes
- Catering facilities: Pantry Car, IRCTC E-Catering, Zomato & Swiggy
- Observation facilities: Large windows
- Baggage facilities: Available
- Other facilities: Below the seats

Technical
- Rolling stock: LHB coach
- Track gauge: 1,676 mm (5 ft 6 in)
- Operating speed: 52 km/h (32 mph) average including halts.

The 12557 / 12558 Sapt Kranti Express is a daily running superfast express train operated by the East Central Railway zone, it is connecting Muzaffarpur Junction in Bihar with Anand Vihar Terminal in Delhi. Introduced on 1st July 2002, it plays a crucial role in linking North Bihar with the national capital

The Sapt Kranti Superfast Express is an ISO 9001:2008 certified service, signifying its commitment to quality and passenger satisfaction

== History ==
The Sapt Kranti Superfast Express is a daily train service operated by Indian Railways that connects Muzaffarpur Junction in Bihar to Anand Vihar Terminal in Delhi. It was introduced on 1st July 2002, initially running between Muzaffarpur and New Delhi Railway Station. However, from 2nd December 2010, its terminal in Delhi was shifted to Anand Vihar Terminal to help decongest New Delhi Station.

The train is named after the historic Sapt Kranti or Seven Revolutions movement launched by socialist leader Dr. Ram Manohar Lohia, symbolizing its ideological link with social and political reform. The name reflects movements associated with equality, non-violence, and social justice, making the train culturally significant, especially in Bihar where Dr. Lohia's influence was strong.

It was upgraded to modern LHB coaches on 2nd October 2019, as part of the 150th birth anniversary celebrations of Mahatma Gandhi. One of the rakes was also decorated with Gandhi-themed artwork during that time.

== Schedule ==
12557 / 12558 Train Schedule
Train Type	Superfast Express
Distance	1059 km (12557) / 1060 km (12558)
Average Speed	~53 km/h
Journey Time (MFP → ANVT)	20 hrs 05 min
Journey Time (ANVT → MFP)	20 hrs 30 min
Classes Available	1A, 2A, 3A, 3E, SL
Operating Days	Daily
Operator	East Central Railway

== Route and halts ==
12557 & 12558 Sapt Kranti Express
Sr.	12557 MFP–ANVT				12558 ANVT–MFP			
Sr.	Station	Day	Arr.	Dep.	Station	Day	Arr.	Dep.
1	Muzaffarpur Junction	1	—	11:35	Anand Vihar Terminal	1	—	14:35
2	Motipur	1	12:07	12:09	Moradabad Junction	1	17:22	17:30
3	Mehsi	1	12:22	12:24	Lucknow Junction	1	22:30	22:40
4	Chakia	1	12:34	12:36	Gonda Junction	2	00:51	00:53
5	Pipra	1	12:46	12:48	Gorakhpur Junction	2	03:40	03:50
6	Bapudham Motihari	1	13:04	13:07	Kaptanganj Junction	2	04:38	04:40
7	Sagauli Junction	1	13:34	13:36	Siswa Bazar	2	05:01	05:03
8	Bettiah Railway Station	1	13:56	13:58	Bagaha	2	05:59	06:02
9	Chanpatia	1	14:14	14:16	Harinagar	2	06:26	06:28
10	Narkatiaganj Junction	1	14:48	14:53	Narkatiaganj Junction	2	06:52	06:57
11	Harinagar	1	15:10	15:12	Chanpatia	2	07:13	07:15
12	Bagaha	1	15:38	15:40	Bettiah	2	07:23	07:26
13	Siswa Bazar	1	16:53	16:55	Sagauli Junction	2	07:49	07:51
14	Kaptanganj Junction	1	17:28	17:30	Bapudham Motihari	2	08:22	08:25
15	Gorakhpur Junction	1	18:30	18:45	Pipra	2	08:41	08:43
16	Gonda Junction	1	21:06	21:08	Chakia	2	08:56	08:58
17	Lucknow Junction	1	23:35	23:40	Mehsi	2	09:08	09:10
18	Moradabad Junction	2	04:42	04:50	Motipur	2	09:28	09:30
19	Anand Vihar Terminal	2	07:40	—	Muzaffarpur Junction	2	11:05	—

== Coach composition and mainteance ==
Coach Composition of Sapt Kranti Express
Category	Coaches	Total
Sleeper Class (SL)	S1, S2, S3, S4, S5, S6	6
AC 3 Tier (3A)	B1, B2, B3, B4, B5	5
AC 3 Tier Economy (3E)	M1	1
AC 2 Tier (2A)	A1, A2	2
AC First Class (1A)	H1	1
General Unreserved (GEN)	GEN, GEN, GEN, GEN	4
Pantry Car (PC)	PC	1
SLRD (Divyangjan cum Luggage Coach)	SLRD	1
End-On Generator (EOG)	EOG	1
Total Coaches		22

- Primary Maintenance - Muzaffarpur Junction Coaching Depot

== See also ==
- Porbandar–Muzaffarpur Express
- Muzaffarpur - Hadapsar (Pune) AC Express
- Swatantra Senani Superfast Express
- Dibrugarh Rajdhani Express
