= Anand Vihar Terminal railway station =

Railway station in Delhi, India

Anand Vihar Terminal

General information
- Location: Anand Vihar, East Delhi; India
- Coordinates: 28°39′2.79″N 77°18′54.86″E
- Elevation: 207.140 metres (679.59 ft)
- System: Indian Railways station
- Owner: Ministry of Railways (India)
- Operator: Indian Railways
- Platforms: 7
- Tracks: 12
- Connections: Blue Line Pink Line Anand Vihar; Anand Vihar; Anand Vihar ISBT

Construction
- Structure type: At grade
- Parking: Available
- Accessible: Disabled access

Other information
- Station code: ANVT
- Zone(s): Northern Railway
- Division(s): Delhi

History
- Opened: 19 December 2009; 16 years ago
Route map
Location
- Interactive map

Anand Vihar Terminal (station code: ANVT), a railway station under the Delhi Division of the Northern Railway zone of Indian Railways, is located in Anand Vihar in Delhi. Anand Vihar Terminal, along with Delhi Junction (Old Delhi), New Delhi, and Hazrat Nizamuddin, comprises one of the major long-distance railway terminals of Delhi. Spread over 42 hectares (100 acres), the terminal is one of the largest railway stations in Delhi, handling the vast majority of east-bound trains originating from Delhi to the states of UP, Bihar, West Bengal and beyond. The station also serves as a stop for Delhi Suburban Railway. The station is integrated with the Anand Vihar RRTS station of Delhi–Meerut Regional Rapid Transit System, Anand Vihar ISBT, and Anand Vihar metro station.

== History ==
Following the announcement of its establishment in 2003, the foundation stone for the terminal was laid on 25 January 2004. After several delays, and multiple revised deadlines, the station was officially inaugurated on 19 December 2009 by the former Union Railway Minister Mamata Banerjee and then Chief Minister of Delhi, Sheila Dikshit.

After the 16 May 2010 stampede at New Delhi railway station, the originating station for several long-haul trains was permanently transferred to the Anand Vihar Terminal.

Between 2004 and 2009, a two-storey railway station, three platforms, a coach maintenance yard, and feeder lines to Sahibabad Junction were completed at the cost of ₹850 million. Eventually, the number of platforms was increased to 7 and a separate building with two platforms for suburban trains was constructed.

In 2016, a 1.1 MW rooftop solar project was installed.

In 2020, the station received a five-star rating for its food-related facilities.

In 2025-26, the Anand Vihar Terminal underwent a ₹224.48 crore airport-style upgrade.

== Facilities ==
The Anand Vihar Terminal has ticket counters, separate arrival and departure areas, reservation halls, waiting halls with amenities for disabled passengers, high-speed Wi-Fi, toilets, parking areas, first floor cloakroom, two escalators, six lifts, a special heritage gallery, custom-built subways for physically challenged passengers, ATMs, foreign exchange counters, food plazas, touch-screen enquiry systems, and dedicated facilities for loading and unloading parcels, linen, and food items in the station yard.

== Major trains ==
The major trains originating at Anand Vihar Terminal are as follows:

- Anand Vihar Terminal–Ayodhya Cantonment Vande Bharat Express (22425/22426)
- Dehradun–Anand Vihar Terminal Vande Bharat Express (22457/22458)
- Agartala - Anand Vihar Terminal Tejas Rajdhani Express (20501/20502)
- Sairang–Anand Vihar Terminal Rajdhani Express (20507/20508)
- Naharlagun - Anand Vihar Terminal Arunachal AC Superfast Express (22411/22412)
- Gorakhpur–Anand Vihar Terminal Humsafar Express (via Basti) (12595/12596)
- Gorakhpur–Anand Vihar Terminal Humsafar Express (via Barhni) (12571/12572)
- Prayagraj–Anand Vihar Terminal Humsafar Express (22437/22438)
- Lucknow Junction–Anand Vihar Terminal Double Decker Express (12583/12584)
- Howrah–Anand Vihar Terminal Amrit Bharat Express (13065/13066)
- Chhapra–Anand Vihar Terminal Amrit Bharat Express (15133/15134)
- Bapudham Motihari – Anand Vihar Terminal Amrit Bharat Express (15567/15568)
- Darbhanga–Anand Vihar Terminal Amrit Bharat Express (15557/15558)
- Kamakhya–Anand Vihar Terminal North East Superfast Express (12505/12506)
- New Jalpaiguri–Anand Vihar Terminal Superfast Express (12523/12524)
- Kamakhya - Anand Vihar Terminal Superfast Express (15621/15622)
- Puri - Anand Vihar Terminal Neelachal Express (12875/12876)
- Puri - Anand Vihar Terminal Purushottam Express (12801/12802)
- Puri - Anand Vihar Terminal Nandan Kanan Express (12815/12816)
- Sealdah - Anand Vihar Terminal West Bengal Sampark Kranti Express (12329/12330)
- Bhubaneswar - Anand Vihar Terminal Odisha Sampark Kranti Express (12819/12820)
- Ranchi - Anand Vihar Terminal Jharkhand Sampark Kranti Express (12825/12826)
- Malda Town - Anand Vihar Terminal Weekly Express (13429/13430)
- Bhubaneswar - Anand Vihar Terminal Superfast Express (22805/22806)
- Haldia–Anand Vihar Terminal Superfast Express (12443/12444)
- Jogbani - Anand Vihar Terminal Seemanchal Express (12487/12488)
- Baba Baidyanath Dham Deoghar Humsafar Express (22459/22460)
- Vikramshila Express (12367/12368)
- Mau–Anand Vihar Terminal Express (15025/15026)
- Santragachi–Anand Vihar Superfast Express (22857/22858)
- Danapur–Anand Vihar Jan Sadharan Express (13257/13258)
- Lalkuan–Anand Vihar Terminal Intercity Express (15059/15060)
- Sapt Kranti Express (12557/12558)
- Sadbhavna Express (via Sitamarhi) (14007/14008)
- Sadbhavna Express (via Faizabad) (14017/14018)
- Poorbiya Express (15279/15280)
- Lichchavi Express (14005/14006)
- Gorakhpur–Anand Vihar Express (15057/15058)
- Jaynagar–Anand Vihar Garib Rath Express (12435/12436)
- Bhagalpur–Anand Vihar Terminal Garib Rath Express (22405/22406)
- Madhupur–Anand Vihar Terminal Humsafar Express (12235/12236)
- Satyagrah Express (15273/15274)
- Banaras-Anand Vihar Terminal Garib Rath Express (22541/22542)
- Ghazipur City–Anand Vihar Terminal Express (22433/22434)
- Gaya–Anand Vihar Garib Rath Express (22409/22410)
- Jharkhand Swarna Jayanti Express (12817/12818)
- Kanpur Central–Anand Vihar Terminal Express (14151/14152)
- Muzaffarpur–Anand Vihar Garib Rath Express (12211/12212)
- Rewa–Anand Vihar Superfast Express (12427/12428)
- Bhrigu Superfast Express (22427/22428)
- Champaran Satyagrah Express (14009/14010)
- Saharsa–Anand Vihar Terminal Jan Sadharan Express (15529/15530)
- Anand Vihar Terminal -- Madhupur Juction Baba Baidyanath Dhan Deoghar SF Express ( 22465/22466 )

== Gallery ==
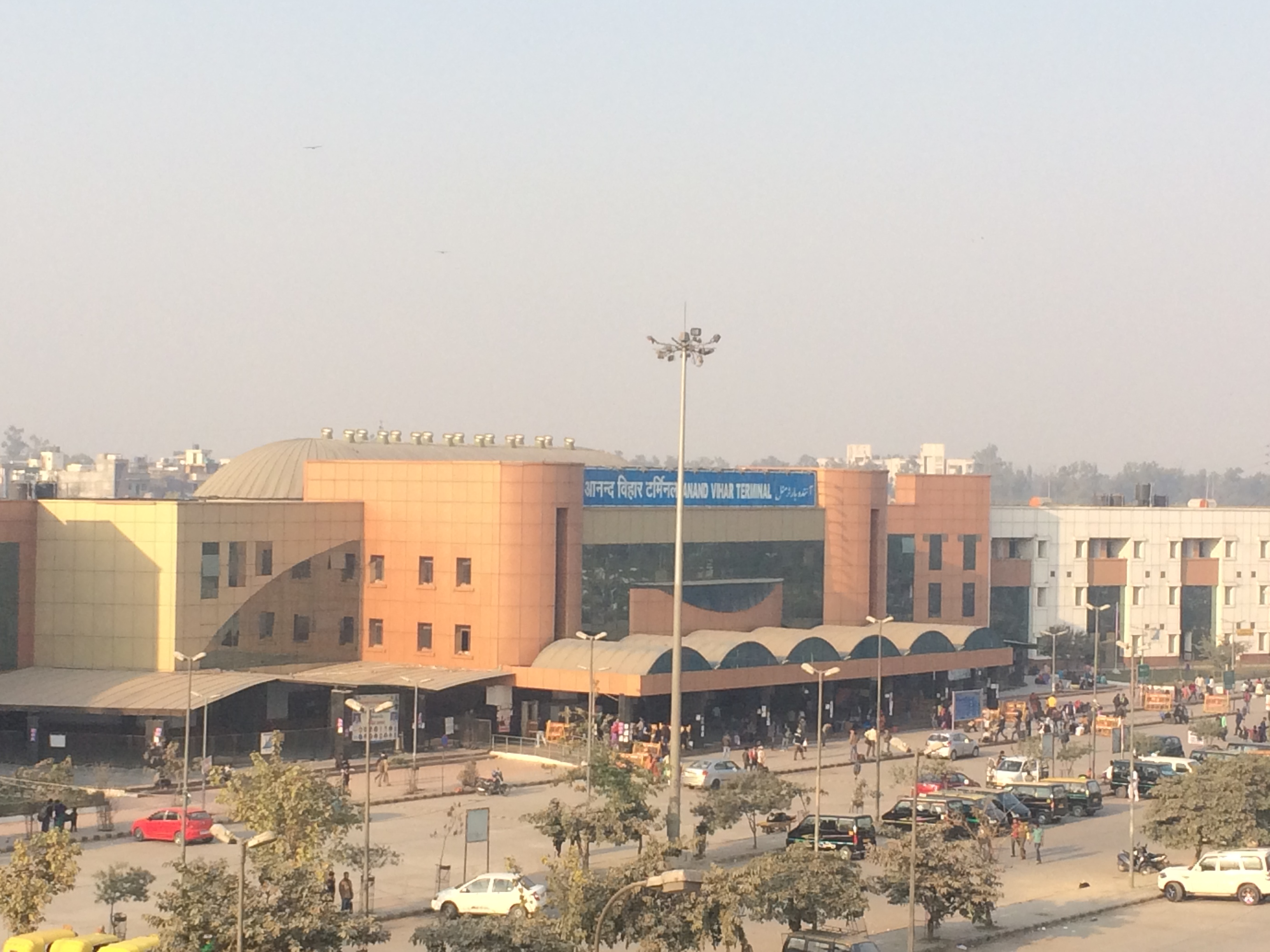
View of the terminal from the Anand Vihar metro station.

Anand Vihar Terminal at night.

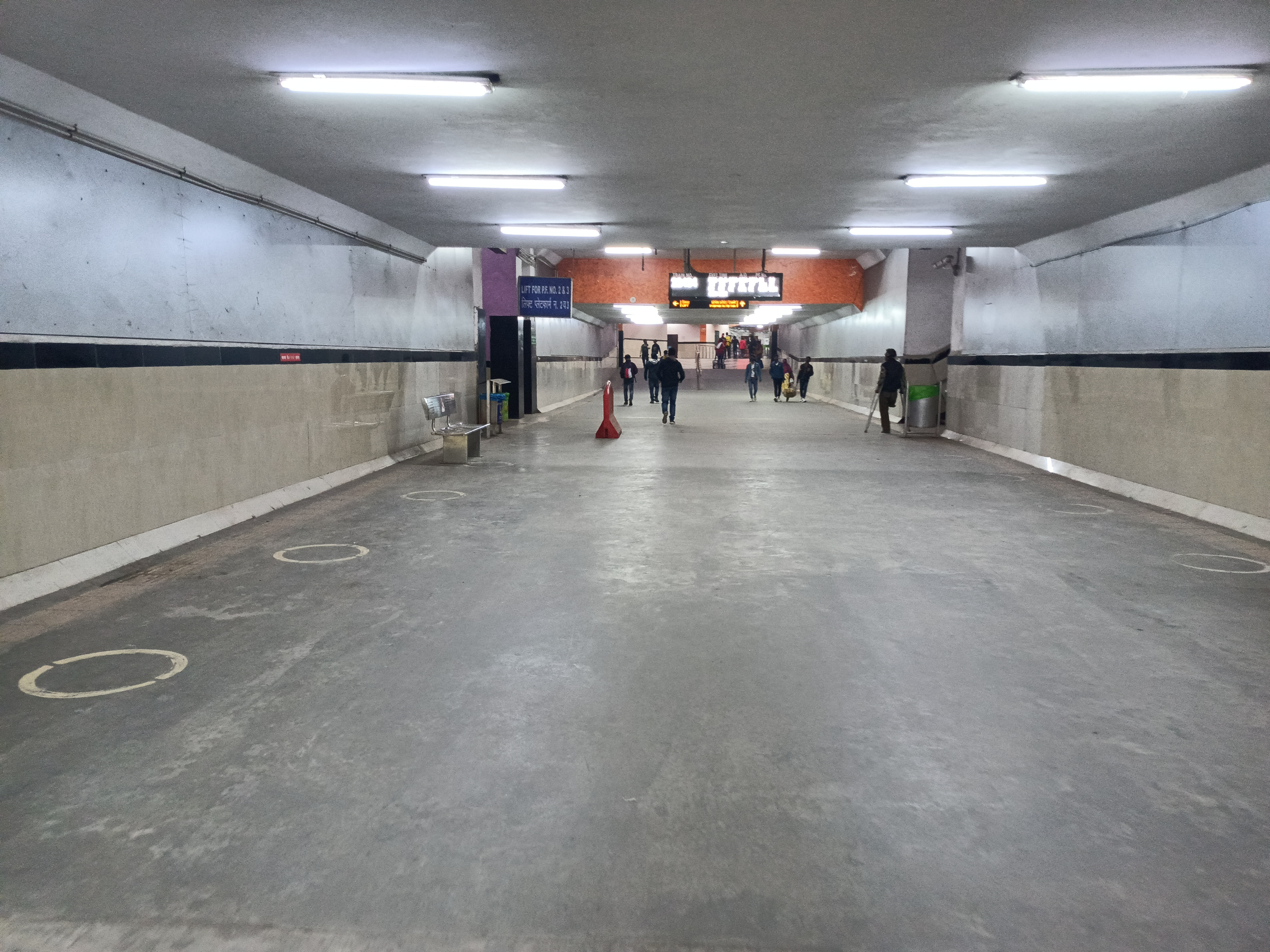
Subway underneath the platforms.

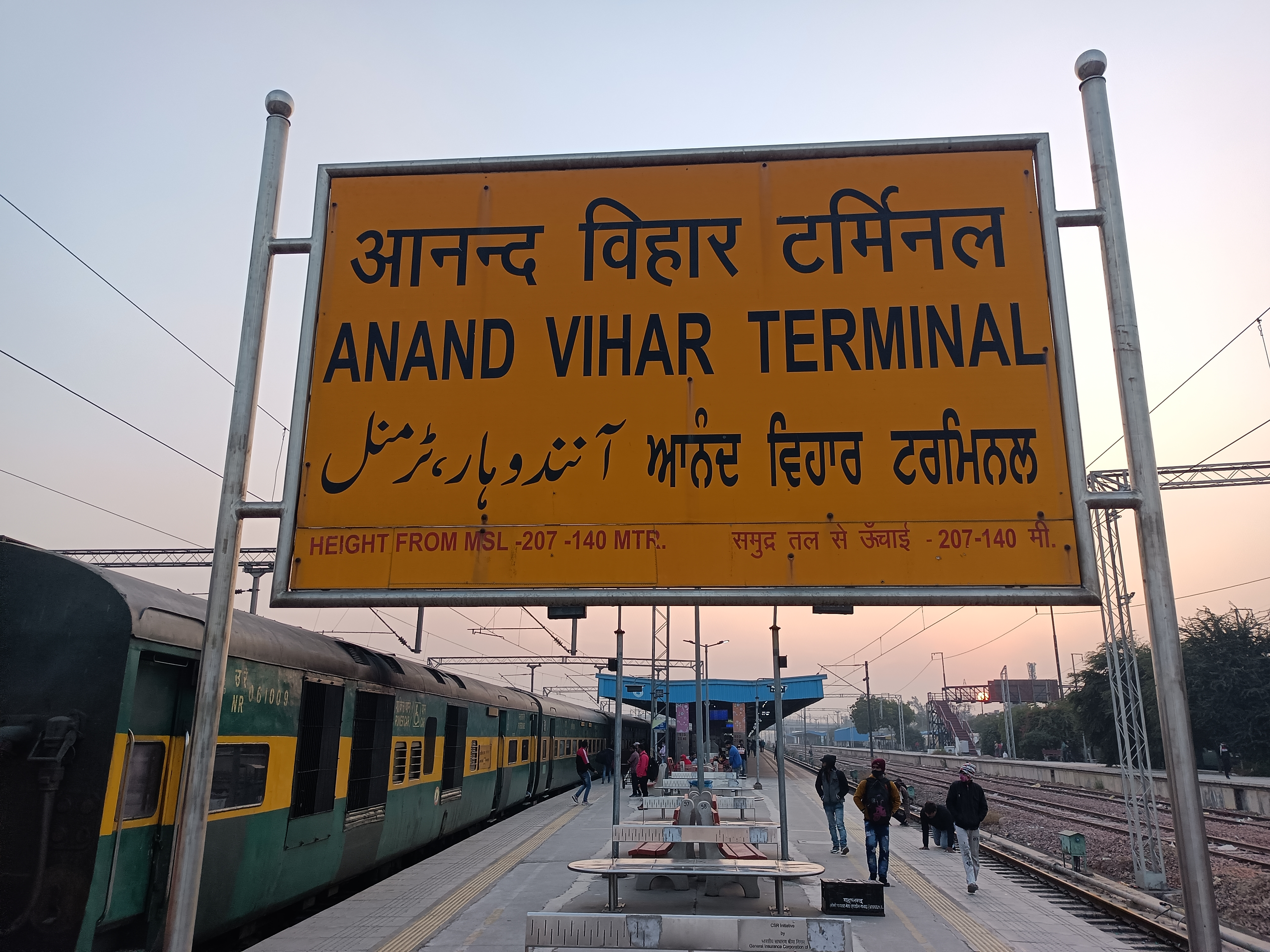
Platform signage.

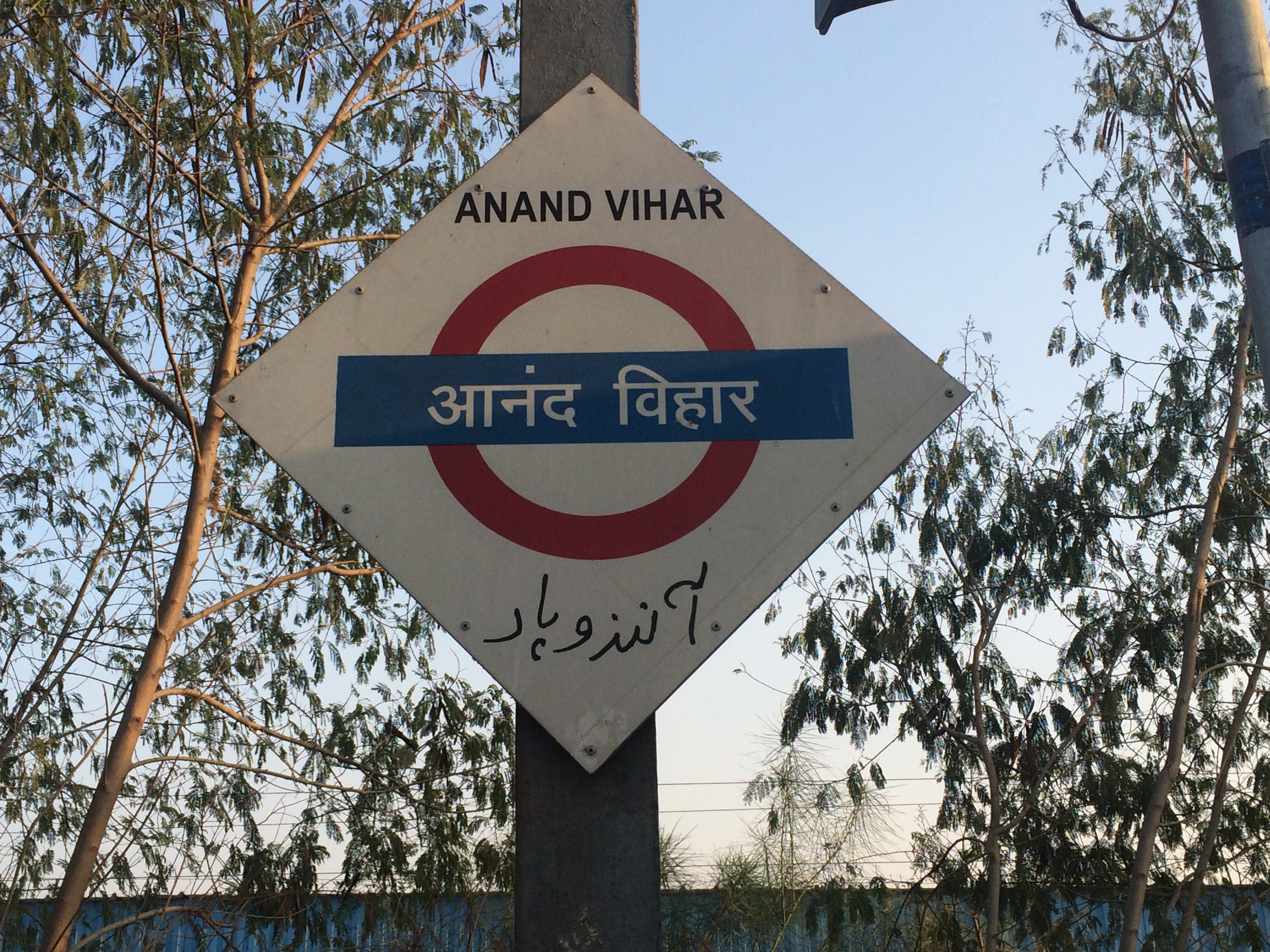
Sign at one of the platforms.

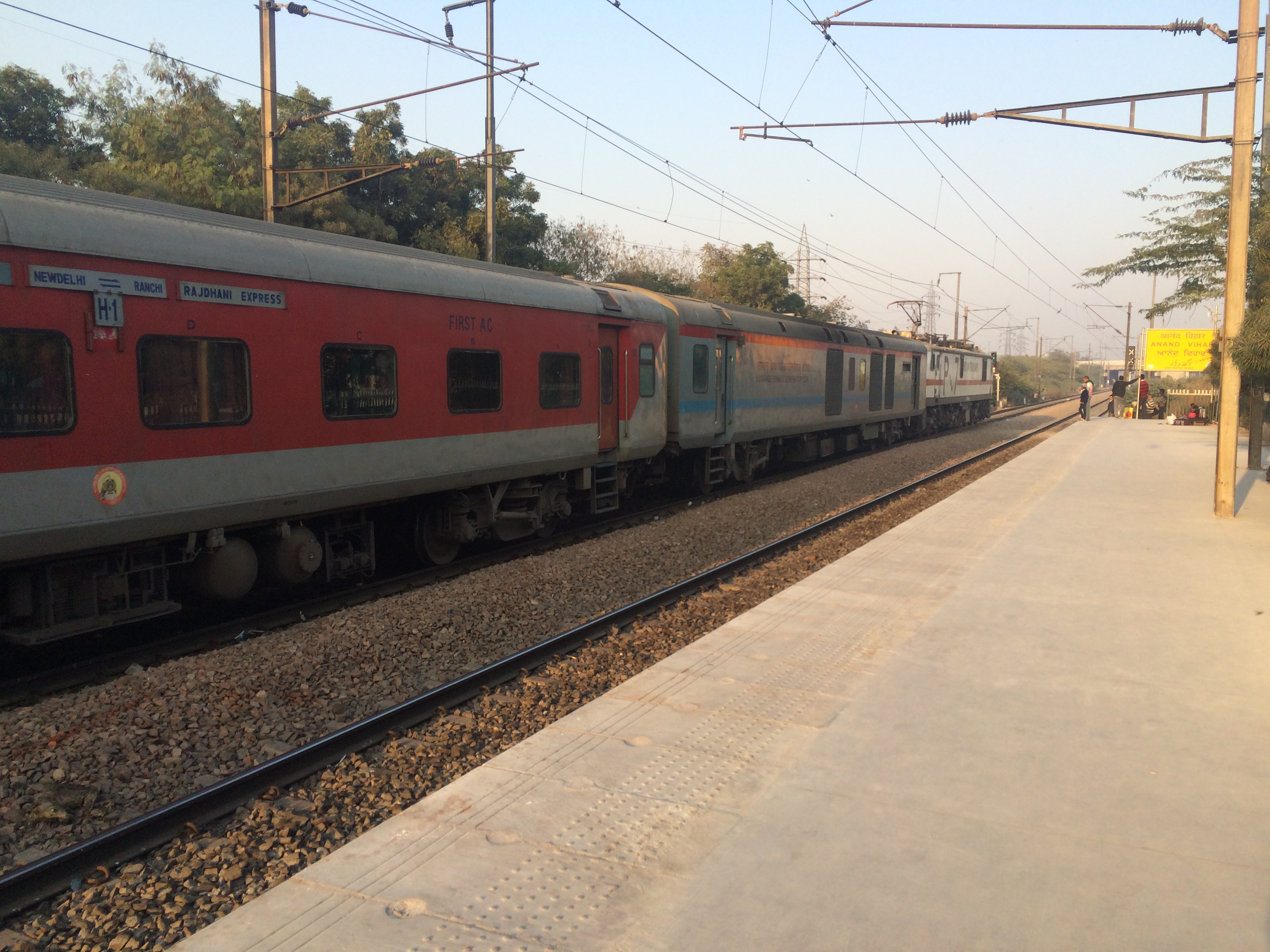
Ranchi Rajdhani Express passing Anand Vihar.

== See also ==
- List of railway stations in India
- New Delhi railway station
- Delhi Junction railway station
- Delhi Cantonment railway station
- Hazrat Nizamuddin railway station
- Sarai Rohilla
