= Sagauli Junction railway station =

Railway station in East Champaran, Bihar, India

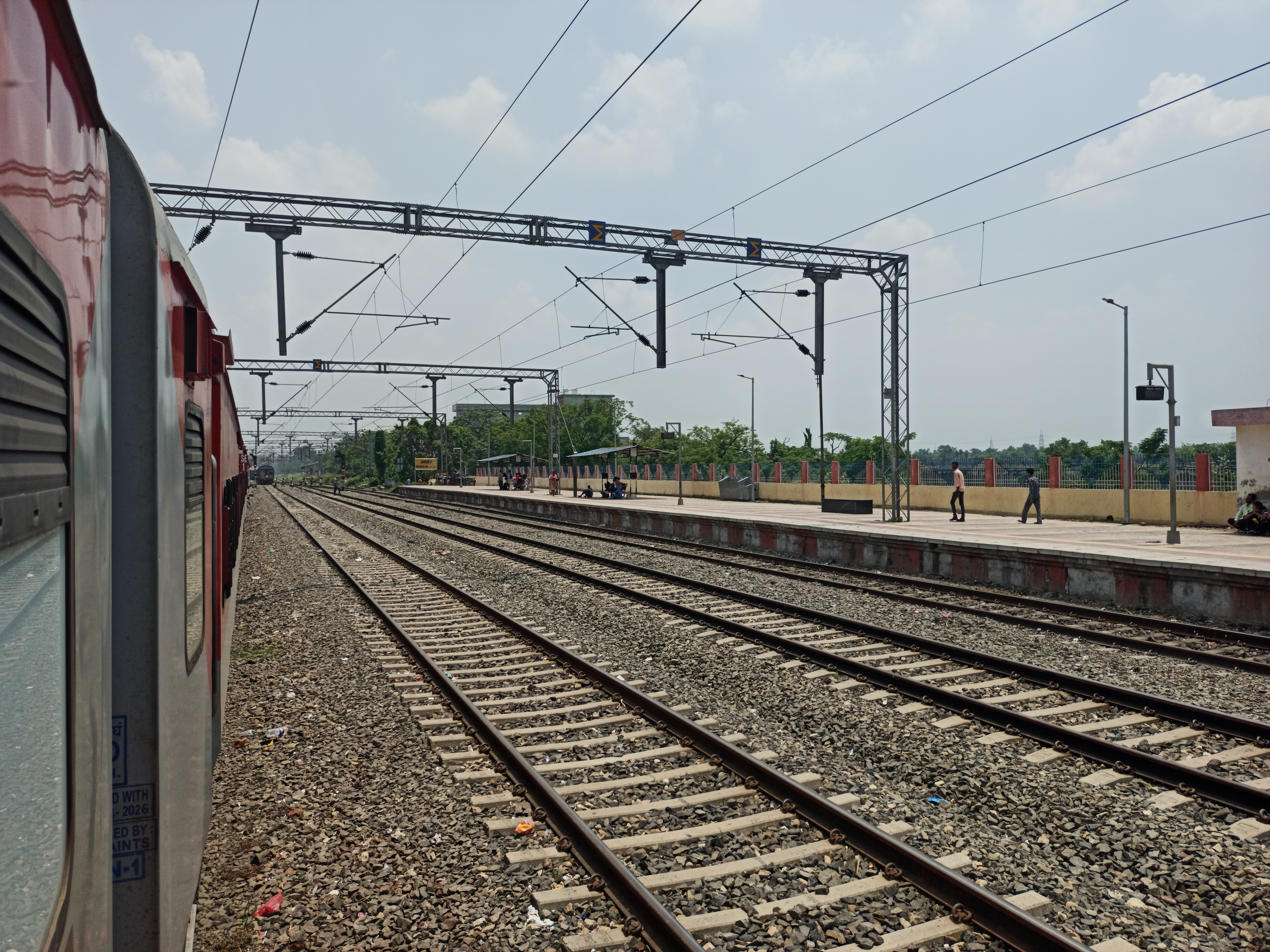
- Sagauli Junction railway station

General information
- Location: NH 28, Sagauli, East Champaran district, Bihar; India
- Coordinates: 26.7587°N 84.7393°E
- Elevation: 75 metres (246 ft)
- System: Indian Railways station
- Owner: Indian Railways
- Operator: East Central Railway
- Lines: Delhi - Muzaffarpur–Gorakhpur main line; Raxaul - Sagauli Line; Sagauli - Hajipur Line; (Under Construction)
- Platforms: 2
- Tracks: 4
- Connections: Auto stand auto rickshaw

Construction
- Structure type: Standard (on-ground station)
- Parking: Yes (Only Auto)
- Cycle facilities: No

Other information
- Status: Active
- Station code: SGL
- Zone(s): East Central Railway

Passengers
- 30000 Daily
Location
- Location within India Location within Bihar

Sagauli Junction railway station (station code: SGL) is a junction railway station in East Champaran district, Bihar. It is on the Delhi–Muzaffarpur–Gorakhpur main line

Sagauli is connected to several cities in Bihar with daily passenger trains. There are multiple daily connections to Muzaffarpur, Raxaul, and Sitamarhi and daily connections to Bagaha, Bettiah, Hajipur, Samastipur, Motihari and Narkatiaganj.

Daily express trains connect to Delhi with stops in major cities in Uttar Pradesh including Gorakhpur and Bareilly. Kolkata is also connected by a daily express train.

There are also direct trains to Lucknow and Varanasi with stops in several towns in Uttar Pradesh. Chhapra, Patna, Jabalpur, Mumbai, Darbhanga, Barauni, Dhanbad, Bokaro, Ranchi, Rourkela, Bilaspur, Raipur and Nagpur are also connected by weekly or multiple weekly trains.

Delhi is connected via Satyagrah Express and Sadbhawna Express. Earlier, all tracks were metre gauge but most have been converted to 5 ft 6 in (1,676 mm) broad gauge. After the completion of the gauge conversion from Darbhanga to Sagauli via Sitamarhi, another broad-gauge route to Sagauli became available from March 2014.

== Trains ==
Samastipur is the divisional headquarters; several local passenger trains and express trains run from Sagauli to neighbouring destinations. List of some important trains that stop at Sagauli:Departures from SGL/Sagauli Junction.

== Connectivity ==
There are total of 49 trains available, Train Departures ECR/East Central Zone – Railway Enquiry.which connect to some major cities of India viz., Amritsar, Bihar (Darbhanga, Katihar, Muzaffarpur, Narkatiaganj, Patliputra, Raxaul & Saharsa), Dehradun, Delhi (Anand Vihar), Guwahati, Gujarat (Ahmedabad & Porbandar), Howrah (Kolkata), Jaipur, Jammu, Mumbai (Bandra & LTT) and Uttar Pradesh (Bareilly, Kanpur, Lucknow & Manduadih).
