= Paschim Champaran Lok Sabha constituency =

Constituency of the Indian parliament in Bihar

Coordinates: 27.2°N 84.2°E

Paschim Champaran
- Lok Sabha constituency

Constituency details
- Country: India
- Region: East India
- State: Bihar
- Assembly constituencies: Nautan; Chanpatia; Bettiah; Raxaul; Sugauli; Narkatiya
- Established: 2008
- Reservation: None

Member of Parliament
- 18th Lok Sabha
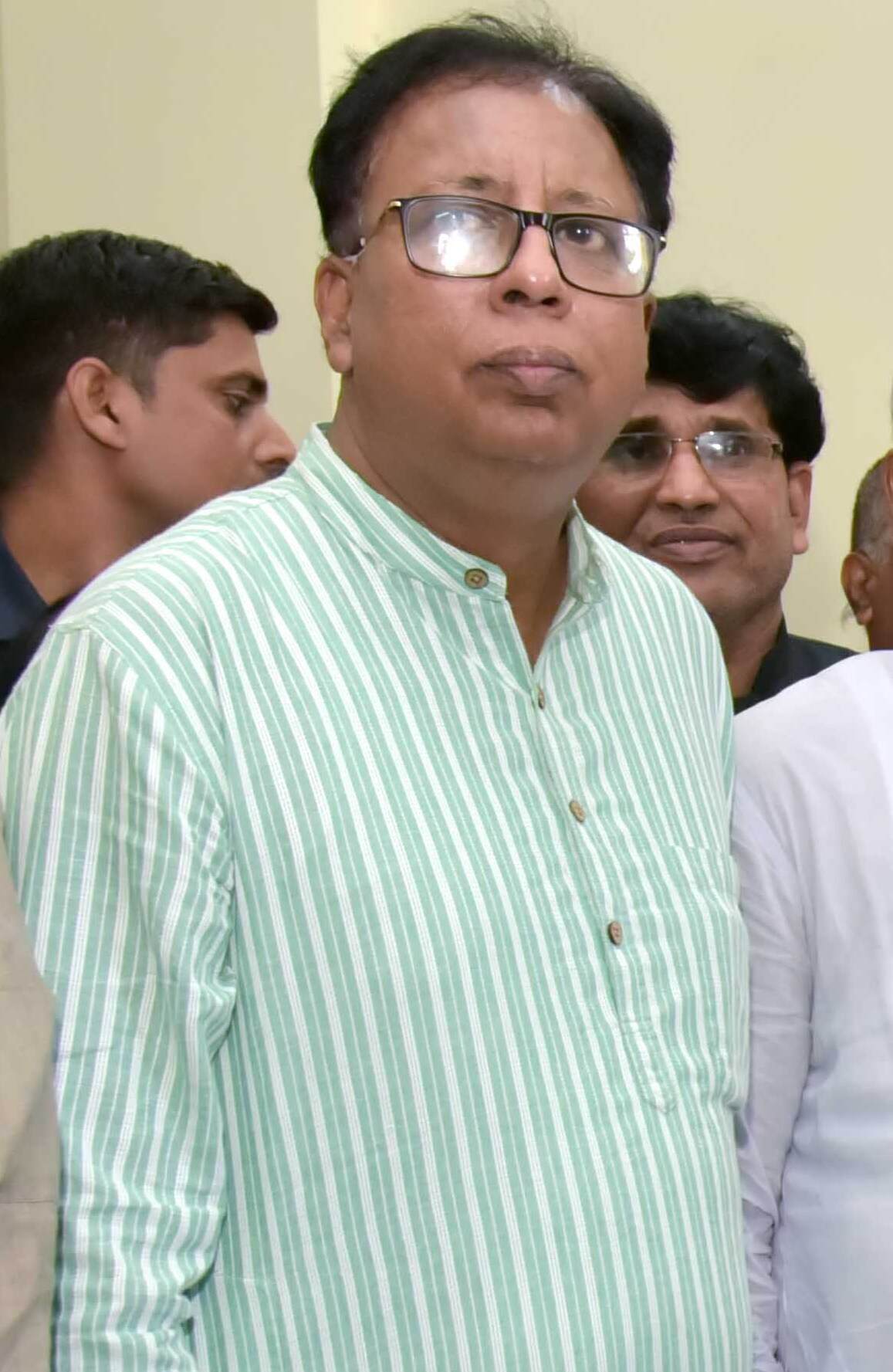
- Incumbent Sanjay Jaiswal
- Party: BJP
- Alliance: NDA
- Elected year: 2019

Paschim Champaran Lok Sabha constituency is one of the 40 Lok Sabha (parliamentary) constituencies in Bihar state in eastern India. This constituency came into existence in 2008, following delimitation of the parliamentary constituencies based on the recommendations of the Delimitation Commission of India constituted in 2002.

== Assembly segments ==
Presently, this constituency comprises six Vidhan Sabha segments, which are:

#	Name	District	Member	Party	2024 Lead
6	Nautan	West Champaran	Narayan Prasad	BJP	BJP
7	Chanpatia	West Champaran	Abhishek Ranjan	INC	BJP
8	Bettiah	West Champaran	Renu Devi	BJP	BJP
10	Raxaul	East Champaran	Pramod Sinha	BJP	BJP
11	Sugauli	East Champaran	Rajesh Kumar Gupta	LJP(RV)	BJP
12	Narkatiya	East Champaran	Vishal Kumar	JD(U)	BJP

== Members of Parliament ==
Year	Name	Party
Till 2008 : See Bettiah
2009	Sanjay Jaiswal	Bharatiya Janata Party
2014	Sanjay Jaiswal	Bharatiya Janata Party
2019	Sanjay Jaiswal	Bharatiya Janata Party
2024	Sanjay Jaiswal	Bharatiya Janata Party

== Election results ==
=== General election 2024 ===
2024 Indian general elections: Paschim Champaran
Party	Candidate	Votes	%	±%
BJP	Sanjay Jaiswal	580,421	53.43	▼6.17
INC	Madan Mohan Tiwari	4,43,853	40.86	
NOTA	None of the above	11,288	1.04	▼3.47
Majority		1,36,568		
Turnout		10,86,798	61.78	
BJP hold		Swing		

=== 2019 ===
2019 Indian general elections: Paschim Champaran
Party	Candidate	Votes	%	±%
BJP	Dr. Sanjay Jaiswal	603,799	59.60	
RLSP	Brijesh Kumar Kushwaha	3,09,800	30.58	
NOTA	None of the Above	45,699	4.51	
BSP	Rakesh Kumar	11,427	1.13	
IND.	Sanjay Kumar Patel	10,801	1.07	
Margin of victory		2,93,906	29.02	
Turnout		10,13,373	62.02	
BJP hold		Swing		

=== 2014 ===
2014 Indian general elections: Paschim Champaran
Party	Candidate	Votes	%	±%
BJP	Dr. Sanjay Jaiswal	371,232	43.43	+4.86
JD(U)	Prakash Jha	2,60,978	30.53	+30.53
RJD	Raghunath Jha	1,21,800	14.25	+14.25
NOTA	None of the Above	18,804	2.20	
CPI(M)	Prabhu Raj Narain Rao	17,157	2.01	−2.54
BSP	Syed Shamim Akhtar	12,415	1.45	−2.86
Margin of victory		1,10,254	12.90	
Turnout		8,54,800	62.57	
BJP hold		Swing		

=== 2009 ===
2009 Indian general elections: Paschim Champaran
Party	Candidate	Votes	%	±%
BJP	Dr. Sanjay Jaiswal	198,781	3.56	
LJP	Prakash Jha	1,51,438	29.38	
INC	Sadhu Yadav (Anirudh Prasad)	70,001	13.48	
CPI(M)	Ramashray Singh	23,462	4.55	
BSP	Shambhu Prasad Gupta	22,199	4.31	
Margin of victory		47,343	9.18	
Turnout		5,15,477	42.22	
BJP win (new seat)				

== See also ==
- Bettiah (Lok Sabha constituency)
- East Champaran district
- West Champaran district
- List of constituencies of the Lok Sabha
- Bettiah Raj
