= Barwa Barauli =

- Village
- Location within Bihar Location within India
- Coordinates: 27.0760258°N 84.5248403°E
- Country: India
- State: Bihar
- District: West Champaran district
- Block: Narkatiaganj
- Elevation: 84 m (276 ft)

Population (2011)
  - Total: 5,008

Languages
  - Official: Hindi
- Time zone: UTC+5:30 (IST)
- ISO 3166 code: IN-BR
- 2011 census code: 216640

Barwa Barauli is Gram panchayat which comes under Narkatiaganj block of West Champaran district in the Indian state of Bihar.

== Governance ==
It comes under Sikta Assembly constituency of Narkatiaganj Block. This panchayat includes Rupwaliya, Rampur, Ammaghaud, Khajuriya, Barwa Barauli, Pokhariya, and Mangrahari villages, having 15 wards.

Neighbouring Panchayats include Bheriharwa, Baitapur, Gokula, and Belwania.

=== Panchayat Representatives ===
- Mukhiya - Shaukat Ali
- Sarpanch - Rijwan Alam
- Jila parishad member - Shafiuddin Urf Teni Bhai

== Education ==
The local schools are:

- Uchch Madhyamik Vidyalay, Barwa Barauli
- Maulana Azad Public School Barwa Barauli
- Ideal Mission School Rupwaliya Bazar

== Health care ==
A Primary Health Centre is sited at Rupwaliya Bazar.

== Transport ==
Gokhula Railway Station is the local. It is on the line between Narkatiaganj Junction railway station and Raxaul Junction railway station.

== Demographics ==
As of the 2011 census of India, Barwa Barauli had a population of 5,008 in 795 households. Males constitute 53.1% and females 46.8% of the population. Barwa Barauli has an average literacy rate of 51%, lower than the national average of 74%: male literacy is 64%, and female literacy is 36%. In Barwa Barauli, 22% of the population is under 6.
