= Dharmesh Prasad Varma =

Indian politician

Member of Parliament, Lok Sabha
- In office 1989–1991
- Preceded by: Manoj Pandey
- Succeeded by: Faiyazul Azam
- Constituency: Bettiah

Member of Bihar Legislative Assembly
- In office 1980–1989
- Preceded by: Faiyazul Azam
- Succeeded by: Faiyazul Azam
- Constituency: Sikta

Personal details
- Born: 18 December 1944 (age 80) Bettiah, West Champaran, Bihar
- Political party: Janata Dal
- Spouse: unmarried
- Relations: Dilip Varma (brother)
- Parent: Amresh Prasad Varma (father)

Dharmesh Prasad Varma is an Indian politician from Bihar who represented Bettiah in the Lok Sabha from 1989 to 1991. He previously served as member of Bihar Legislative Assembly from Sikta on Janata Party ticket from 1980 to 1989. He contested 2014 Indian general election on AAP ticket from Valmiki Nagar only to lose to Satish Chandra Dubey of the BJP. He contested 2015 Bihar election from Sikta on Samajwadi Party ticket but lost to Firoj Ahmad of the JDU.

== Personal life ==
Verma was born in a Kayastha family.
