= Mujauna =

Mujauna may refer to any of the following villages in India:

Uttar Pradesh:

- Mujauna, Gola, a village in the Gola Tahsil of Gorakhpur district (Census code 188102)

Bihar:

- Mujauna, Alauli, a village in the Alauli block of Khagaria district (Census code 238571)
- Mujauna, Dariapur, a village in the Dariapur block of Saran district (Census code 234165)
- Mujauna, Sugauli, a village under the Sugauli panchayat, in the Narkatiaganj block of Pashchim Champaran district (Census code 216684)
- Mujauna, Shikarpur, a village under the Shikarpur panchayat, in the Narkatiaganj block of Pashchim Champaran district (Census code 216599)
- Mujauna, Parsa, a village in the Parsa block of Saran district (Census code 234093)
- Mujauna, Sikta, a village in the Sikta block of Pashchim Champaran district (Census code 217241)
- Mujauna, Samastipur, a village in Samastipur district
