= Madan Prasad Jaiswal =

Indian politician (1936-2009)

Member of Parliament, Lok Sabha
- In office 1996–2004
- Preceded by: Faiyazul Azam
- Succeeded by: Raghunath Jha
- Constituency: Bettiah

Member of the Bihar Legislative Assembly
- In office 1990–1995
- Preceded by: Gauri Shankar Pandey
- Succeeded by: Birval Yadav
- Constituency: Bettiah

Personal details
- Born: 27 February 1936 Bettiah, Bengal Presidency, British India (present day West Champaran, Bihar, India)
- Died: 20 February 2009 (aged 72) Patna, Bihar, India
- Party: Bharatiya Janata Party
- Spouse: Saroj Jaiswal (m. 1964)
- Children: 4 (2 daughters and 2 sons including Sanjay Jaiswal)

Dr. Madan Prasad Jaiswal (27 February 1936 – 20 February 2009) was a member of the 11th Lok Sabha, 12th Lok Sabha, and 13th Lok Sabha of India. He represented Bettiah constituency of Bihar from 1996 to 2004, and was a founding member of the Bharatiya Janata Party.

He died due to brain haemorrhage on 20 February 2009 at Patna in Bihar.

== Early life ==
Madan Prasad Jaiswal was born on 27 February 1936 to Sri Ramyad Ram Jaiswal and Smt Ram Dulari Jaiswal. He did his schooling from Eving Christian College at Allahabad in Uttar Pradesh, M.B.B.S from P.W. Medical College, Masters in General Medicine(M.D) from Patna University at Patna in Bihar, and E.C.F.M.G fellowship from Chicago of US.

He married Smt. Saroj Jaiswal, a doctor by profession, and the couple had two daughters and two sons. One of his sons, Sanjay Jaiswal, is the current member of the 15th Lok Sabha from Bharatiya Janata Party.

== Career ==
He did his research in neurological complications in T.B.M and then started his professional career as medical practitioner at Bettiah of Bihar state of India. Coming from an agricultural family, he was also well attached with villages and agriculture, which inspired him to work for downtrodden and poor people in remote villages lacking medical facilities. Through social and cultural societies and organisations in which he was chairman or governor organised several camps for blood donation, eye donation and took the medical help to the not easily accessible remote villages in Bihar, Assam, Orissa, West Bengal and the Northeastern states of India.

He established blood banks while being life member and treasurer of Red Cross Society of India, worked as Vice-President of Indian Medical Association, was one of Governing body member of Indian Council of Medical Research (I.C.M.R), and was part of Board of Governors of the National Institute of Pharmaceutical Education and Research.

=== Political career ===
He entered into politics in mid of 1980 and was elected as Chairman of Municipal Council of Bettaiah. He, later founded Bharatiya Janata Party political party as one of his founding member in Bihar in 1980. In 1990, he was elected as MLA to Bihar Legislative Assembly. Between 1992 and 1995, he worked as Convenor of Internal Resource Committee in Bihar Legislative Assembly and between 1993 and 1994 as a Chairman of Estimates Committee. In 1995, he was appointed as President of BJP Medical Cell(Chikitsa Manch) of Bihar.

In 1996, he contested for Member of Parliament from Bettiah constituency on Bharatiya Janata Party ticket to enter 11th Lok Sabha and successively got re-elected to 12th Lok Sabha and 13th Lok Sabha in 1998 and 1999.

In 2004 elections for Member of Parliament, he lost to Rashtriya Janata Dal candidate Raghunath Jha. He later quit BJP to join RJD when differences mounted in tickets sharing and selection of right candidates with BJP state unit president Keshri Nath Tripathi to return to BJP in few months with high command intervention.

=== Positions held ===
- Chairman, Municipal Council, Bettiah between 1978 and 1983.
- Founding Member of Bharatiya Janata Party in 1980.
- Member of Executive Committee of Bharatiya Janata Party in Bihar from 1990 onwards.
- Elected as MLA for Bihar Legislative Assembly between 1990 and 1995.
- Served as Convenor for Internal Resources Committee in Bihar Legislative Assembly between 1992 and 1995.
- Served as chairman for Estimates Committee in Bihar Legislative Assembly between 1992 and 1995.
- Elected as President of Bharatiya Janata Party Chikitsa Manch of Bihar.
- Elected to 11th Lok Sabha in 1996.
- Served as Member of Committee on Commerce between 1996 and 1997.
- Served as Member of Consultative Committee in Ministry of Defence between 1996 and 1997.
- Re-elected to 12th Lok Sabha in 1998.
- Elected as Bharatiya Janata Party Secretary in 1998.
- Served as Member of Consultative Committee in Ministry of Coals and Textiles between 1998 and 1999.
- Re-elected to 13th Lok Sabha in 1999.
- Served as Member of Committee on Railways and Member of Joint Committee on Salaries and Allowances for members of parliament between 1999 and 2000.
- Served as Member of Committee on Public Accounts between 1999 and 2001.

== At United Nations General Assembly ==
Representing India, Madan Jaiswal speaking at 57th General Assembly as part of fourth committee and 14th meeting on 22 October 2002, he expressed concerns over lack of communication in advance, insufficient information in advance, delays in reimbursement, lack of training, lack of contingent-owned equipment and full self-sustainability as the major concerns for developing nations like India, which being one of the major troop contributor to the United Nations Security Council. He called for innovative approaches for effective and strategic deployment of troops from member states to maintain international peace and security. He also called for transparency in appointment of senior appointments of DPKO and develop global norms for peace operations that were achievable by all member states rather than reflecting the norms of any particular group of countries.

Representing India, Madan Jaiswal speaking at 57th General Assembly as part of fourth committee and 17th meeting on 30 October 2002, he asked United Nations to play a role in bridging the gap between developing and developed nations in getting access to the information and communication technologies. He also noted that India decided to give greater importance to global information and communication order with an aim of strengthening peace and international understanding through free, wider and balanced dissemination of information.
