= Birval Yadav =

Indian politician

Birbal Yadav

Member of the Bihar Legislative Assembly
- In office 1995–2000
- Preceded by: Madan Prasad Jaiswal
- Succeeded by: Renu Devi
- Constituency: Bettiah

Personal details
- Born: Shayam pur kotranha, Nautan west Champaran, Bihar
- Party: Rashtriya Janata Dal; Janata Dal
- Children: 5(1 Daughter And 4 Sons
- Occupation: Politician social work cane farming

Birval Yadav is an Indian politician who was elected as a member of Bihar Legislative Assembly from Bettiah constituency in 1995.He defeated the prominent leader of BJP and former Lok Sabha member Madan Prasad Jaiswal.

== See also ==
- Bettiah Assembly constituency
