= Belwania =

Belwania may refer to

- Belwania, Bihar, a village in Bihar, India.
- Belwania, Uttar Pradesh, a village in Uttar Pradesh, India.
