= Bhikhna Thori railway station =

Railway station in West Champaran, Bihar, India

General information
- Location: West Champaran district, Bihar; India
- Coordinates: 27.3333°N 84.6140°E
- Elevation: 192 metres (630 ft)
- System: Indian Railways station
- Owner: Indian Railways
- Operator: East Central Railway
- Line: Narkatiaganj–Bhikhna Thori branch line
- Platforms: 2
- Tracks: 4
- Connections: Auto stand

Construction
- Structure type: Standard (on-ground station)
- Parking: No
- Cycle facilities: No

Other information
- Status: Active
- Station code: BKF
- Zone(s): East Central Railway
- Division(s): Samastipur

Services
Preceding station	Indian Railways	Following station
Gawnaha towards ?	Narkatiaganj–Bhikhna Thori branch line	Terminus
Route map
Location
- Location within India Location within Bihar

Bhikhna Thori railway station is a small terminus railway station on Narkatiaganj–Bhikhna Thori branch line in West Champaran district, Bihar. Its code is BKF. It serves Bhikhna Thori village. The station consists of two platforms.

Bhikhna Thori is terminal station before the Indo-Nepal border. It is connected with the Gorakhpur–Narkatiaganj–Raxaul rail line at Narkatiaganj Junction.

== Gauge conversion ==
Presently services are suspended on this 36 km line since 2015, as it is undergoing gauge conversion, from metre to broad gauge. It is expected that the first stretch between Narkatiaganj Junction and Amolwa (13 km) to be completed in March 2020 and by June 2020, up to Gawnaha (23 km). The final section between Gawnaha and Bhikhna Thori (13 km) passes through dense forest and needs a special permit from the Forest Department allowing construction works. As of August 2019, the permit has not been given. According to the Forest Department, Gawnaha – Bhikhna Thori section should be closed and the railway land transferred to them.

== See also ==
- Narkatiaganj Junction railway station
- Raxaul Junction railway station
