= Bishunpurwa =

Bishunpurwa may refer to

- Bishunpurwa (census code 216654), a village in West Champaran, India.
- Bishunpurwa (census code 216586), a village in West Champaran, India.
