= Majhowlia railway station =

Railway station in Bihar, India

Majhowlia

General information
- Location: Majhowlia, West Champaran district, Bihar; India
- Coordinates: 26°48′10″N 84°37′09″E
- Elevation: 76 m (249 ft)
- System: Passenger train station
- Owner: Indian Railways
- Operator: East Central Railway
- Line: Muzaffarpur–Gorakhpur main line
- Platforms: 1
- Tracks: 2

Construction
- Structure type: Standard (on ground station)

Other information
- Status: Active
- Station code: MJL
- Zone(s): East Central Railway zone
- Division(s): Samastipur

History
- Opened: 1930s

Services
Preceding station	Indian Railways	Following station
Bettiah towards ?	East Central Railway zone Muzaffarpur–Gorakhpur main line	Parsa Nagar Halt towards ?
Location

Majhowlia railway station (station code: MJL), is a railway station on Muzaffarpur–Gorakhpur main line under the Samastipur railway division of East Central Railway zone. Government Polytechnic West Champaran (under Department of Science, Technology and Technical Education Department, Bihar, Patna) is situated only 3 KM away from this railway station.It provides a very good connectivity for students who come for study from Motihari or Other places.This is situated at Majhowlia in West Champaran district of the Indian state of Bihar.
