= Chaurbar =

- Village
- Location within Bihar
- Coordinates: 27.108°N 84.464°E
- Country: India
- State: Bihar
- District: West Champaran district

Languages
  - Official: Hindi
- Time zone: UTC+5:30 (IST)
- ISO 3166 code: IN-BR

Chaurbar is a village in West Champaran district in the Indian state of Bihar.

== Demographics ==
As of the 2011 census of India, Chaurbar had a population of 473 in 84 households. Males constitute 48.62% of the population and females 51.37%. Chaurbar has an average literacy rate of 31.28%, lower than the national average of 74%: male literacy is 62.83%, and female literacy is 37.16%. In Chaurbar, 24.94% of the population is under 6 years of age.
