= Maldi, Bihar =

Maldi
- Village
- Location within Bihar
- Coordinates: 27.108°N 84.464°E
- Country: India
- State: Bihar
- District: West Champaran district

Languages
  - Official: Hindi
- Time zone: UTC+5:30 (IST)
- ISO 3166 code: IN-BR

Maldi is a village in West Champaran district in the Indian state of Bihar.

== Demographics ==
As of the 2011 census of India, Maldi had a population of 1926 in 360 households. Males constitute 52.23% of the population and females 47.76%. Maldi has an average literacy rate of 33.28%, lower than the national average of 74%: male literacy is 64.1%, and female literacy is 35.8%. In Maldi, 24% of the population is under 6 years of age.

The village code is 216619 as per the 2011 census. Its pincode is 845451. Narkatiyaganj is the nearest town, located 10 km away from Maldi.

Maldi has a lower literacy rate, at 43.8%, than the state of Bihar, at 61.80%. The male literacy rate stands at nearly 54% as per the last census, whereas for females, it stands at nearly 33%.

The village is administered by a Sarpanch, according to the laws set out in the Indian Constitution and the Panchayati Raj system.
