= Manwa, Bihar =

Manwa
- Village
- Location within Bihar
- Coordinates: 27.108°N 84.464°E
- Country: India
- State: Bihar
- District: West Champaran district

Languages
  - Official: Hindi
- Time zone: UTC+5:30 (IST)
- ISO 3166 code: IN-BR

Manwa is a village in West Champaran district in the Indian state of Bihar.

== Demographics ==
As of the 2011 census of India, Manwa had a population of 1616 in 268 households. Males constitute 54% of the population and females 45%. Manwa has an average literacy rate of 37.8%, lower than the national average of 74%: male literacy is 67.75%, and female literacy is 32.24%. In Manwa, 24.31% of the population is under 6 years of age.
