= Kharpokhra railway station =

Railway station in Bihar, India

Kharpokhra

General information
- Location: Sapahi Marg, Chowtkipatti, Pakargawn, West Champaran district, Bihar; India
- Coordinates: 27°08′33″N 84°09′10″E
- Elevation: 97 m (318 ft)
- System: Passenger train station
- Owner: Indian Railways
- Operator: East Central Railway
- Line: Muzaffarpur–Gorakhpur main line
- Platforms: 2
- Tracks: 2

Construction
- Structure type: Standard (on ground station)

Other information
- Status: Active
- Station code: KPB
- Zone(s): East Central Railway zone
- Division(s): Samastipur

History
- Opened: 1930s

Services
Preceding station	Indian Railways	Following station
Bagaha towards ?	East Central Railway zone Muzaffarpur–Gorakhpur main line	Bhairoganj towards ?
Location

Kharpokhra railway station (station code: KPB), is a railway station on Muzaffarpur–Gorakhpur main line under the Samastipur railway division of East Central Railway zone. This is situated beside Sapahi Marg at Chowtkipatti, Pakargawn in West Champaran district of the Indian state of Bihar.
