= Maldahia =

- Village
- Nickname: Maldahia Pokharia
- Location within Bihar
- Coordinates: 27.108°N 84.464°E
- Country: India
- State: Bihar
- District: West Champaran district
- Established: Bihar
- Founder: Not Known Yet
- Named for: Maldahiya pokhariya

Area
  - Total: 10 km^{2} (3.9 sq mi)

Population
  - Total: 5,000
  - Density: 500/km^{2} (1,300/sq mi)

Languages Hindi, Bhojpuri
  - Official Hindi: Hindi
- Time zone: UTC+5:30 (IST)
- ISO 3166 code: IN-BR
- Vehicle registration: BR-22

Maldahia is a village in West Champaran district in the Indian state of Bihar.

== Demographics ==
As of the 2011 census of India, Maldahia had a population of 3909 in 671 households. Males constitute 52.13% of the population and females 47.86%. Maldahia has an average literacy rate of 46%, lower than the national average of 74%: male literacy is 64.18%, and female literacy is 35.81%. In Maldahia, 24.68% of the population is under 6 years of age.
