= Khiria =

- Village
- Location within Bihar
- Coordinates: 27.108°N 84.464°E
- Country: India
- State: Bihar
- District: West Champaran district

Languages
  - Official: Hindi
- Time zone: UTC+5:30 (IST)
- ISO 3166 code: IN-BR

Khiria is a village in West Champaran district in the Indian state of Bihar.

== Demographics ==
As of the 2011 census of India, Khiria had a population of 1209 in 224 households. Males constitute 52% of the population and females 47%. Khiria has an average literacy rate of 44.58%, lower than the national average of 74%: male literacy is 64.74%, and female literacy is 35.25%. In Khiria, 17.86% of the population is under 6 years of age.
