= Mathia Khap, Bihar =

Mathia Khap
- Village
- Location within Bihar
- Coordinates: 27.108°N 84.464°E
- Country: India
- State: Bihar
- District: West Champaran district

Languages
  - Official: Hindi
- Time zone: UTC+5:30 (IST)
- ISO 3166 code: IN-BR

Mathia Khap is a village in West Champaran district in the Indian state of Bihar.

== Demographics ==
As of the 2011 census of India, Mathia Khap had a population of 99 in 22 households. Males constitute 56.5% of the population and females 43.4%. Mathia Khap has an average literacy rate of 20.2%, lower than the national average of 74%: male literacy is 65%, and female literacy is 34%. In Mathia Khap, 27.2% of the population is under 6 years of age.
