= Pokharia, Bihar =

Pokharia
- Village
- Location within Bihar
- Coordinates: 27.108°N 84.464°E
- Country: India
- State: Bihar
- District: West Champaran district

Languages
  - Official: Hindi
- Time zone: UTC+5:30 (IST)
- ISO 3166 code: IN-BR

Pokharia is a village in West Champaran district in the Indian state of Bihar.

== Demographics ==
As of the 2011 census of India, Pokharia had a population of 2796 in 488 households. Males constitute 51.3% of the population and females 48.6%. Pokharia has an average literacy rate of 44.5%, lower than the national average of 74%: male literacy is 60.2%, and female literacy is 39.7%. In Pokharia, 23.2% of the population is under 6 years of age.
