= Maga Rahi =

- Village
- Location within Bihar
- Coordinates: 27.108°N 84.464°E
- Country: India
- State: Bihar
- District: West Champaran district

Languages
  - Official: Hindi
- Time zone: UTC+5:30 (IST)
- ISO 3166 code: IN-BR

Maga Rahi is a village that is located in the West Champaran district in the Indian state of Bihar.

== Demographics ==
As of the 2011 census of India, Maga Rahi had a population of 1983 in 327 households. Males constitute 52.84% of the population and females 47.15%. Maga Rahi has an average literacy rate of 44.32%, lower than the national average of 74%: male literacy is 67.12%, and female literacy is 32.87%. In Maga Rahi, 21.43% of the population is under 6 years of age.
