= Ajay Kumar Singh (Bihar politician, Bharatiya Janata Party) =

Indian politician

Member of Bihar Legislative Assembly
- In office 2000–2020
- Preceded by: Raj Nandan Rai
- Succeeded by: Pramod Kumar Sinha
- Constituency: Raxaul

Personal details
- Born: 7 February 1950 (age 76) Bettiah, West Champaran, Bihar
- Party: Bharatiya Janata Party
- Spouse: Heera Singh
- Children: 3 daughters
- Parent: Vishwanath Singh (father)
- Education: MBBS

Ajay Kumar Singh is an Indian politician who served as a Member of the Bihar Legislative Assembly from the Raxaul representing the Bharatiya Janata Party in 2010 and 2015.
