= Natkatia =

- Village
- Location within Bihar
- Coordinates: 27.108°N 84.464°E
- Country: India
- State: Bihar
- District: West Champaran district

Languages
  - Official: Hindi
- Time zone: UTC+5:30 (IST)
- ISO 3166 code: IN-BR

Natkatia is a village in West Champaran district in the Indian state of Bihar.

== Demographics ==
As of the 2011 census of India, Natkatia had a population of 1070 in 247 households. Males constitute 51.9% of the population and females 48%. Natkatia has an average literacy rate of 43.17%, lower than the national average of 74%: male literacy is 61.47%, and female literacy is 38.52%. In Natkatia, 20.8% of the population is under 6 years of age.
