= Bhagauna =

- Village
- Location within Bihar
- Coordinates: 27.108°N 84.464°E
- Country: India
- State: Bihar
- District: West Champaran district

Languages
  - Official: Hindi
- Time zone: UTC+5:30 (IST)
- ISO 3166 code: IN-BR

Bhagauna is a village in West Champaran district in the Indian state of Bihar.

== Demographics ==
As of the 2011 census of India, Bhagauna had a population of 2118 in 367 households. Males constitute 51.84% of the population and females 48.15%. Bhagauna has an average literacy rate of 50.75%, lower than the national average of 74%: male literacy is 62.51%, and female literacy is 37.48%. In Bhagauna, 22.6% of the population is under 6 years of age.
