= Hainswa =

- Village
- Location within Bihar
- Coordinates: 27.108°N 84.464°E
- Country: India
- State: Bihar
- District: West Champaran district

Languages
  - Official: Hindi
- Time zone: UTC+5:30 (IST)
- ISO 3166 code: IN-BR

Hainswa is a village in West Champaran district in the Indian state of Bihar.

== Demographics ==
As of the 2011 census of India, Hainswa had a population of 1646 in 281 households. Males constitute 50.12% of the population and females 49.87%. Hainswa has an average literacy rate of 42.2%, lower than the national average of 74%: male literacy is 64.6%, and female literacy is 35.3%. In Hainswa, 24.42% of the population is under 6 years of age.
