= Bhairoganj railway station =

Railway station in Bihar, India

Bhairoganj

General information
- Location: Bhairoganj-Bassgaon Link Road, Ramnagar West Champaran district, Bihar; India
- Coordinates: 27°09′05″N 84°14′33″E
- Elevation: 100 m (330 ft)
- System: Passenger train station
- Owner: Indian Railways
- Operator: East Central Railway
- Line: Muzaffarpur–Gorakhpur main line
- Platforms: 1
- Tracks: 1

Construction
- Structure type: Standard (on ground station)

Other information
- Status: Active
- Station code: BRU
- Zone(s): East Central Railway zone
- Division(s): Samastipur

History
- Opened: 1930s

Services
Preceding station	Indian Railways	Following station
Kharpokhra towards ?	East Central Railway zone Muzaffarpur–Gorakhpur main line	Harinagar towards ?
Location

Bhairoganj railway station is a railway station on Muzaffarpur–Gorakhpur main line under the Samastipur railway division of East Central Railway zone. This is situated beside Bhairoganj-Bassgaon Link Road at Ramnagar in West Champaran district of the Indian state of Bihar.
