= Jaimangalpur =

- Village
- Location within Bihar
- Coordinates: 27.108°N 84.464°E
- Country: India
- State: Bihar
- District: West Champaran district

Languages
  - Official: Hindi
- Time zone: UTC+5:30 (IST)
- ISO 3166 code: IN-BR

Jaimangalpur is a village in West Champaran district in the Indian state of Bihar.

== Demographics ==
As of the 2011 census of India, Jaimangalpur had a population of 1927 in 352 households. Males constitute 52.1% of the population and females 47.8%. Jaimangalpur has an average literacy rate of 47.48%, lower than the national average of 74%: male literacy is 62.18%, and female literacy is 37.81%. In Jaimangalpur, 23.97% of the population is under 6 years of age.
