= Khairwa, Bihar =

Khairwa Khairwa Dargah
- Village
- Location within Bihar
- Coordinates: 27.108°N 84.464°E
- Country: India
- State: Bihar
- District: West Champaran district

Languages
  - Official: Urdu
- Time zone: UTC+5:30 (IST)
- ISO 3166 code: IN-BR

Khairwa is a village in West Champaran district in the Indian state of Bihar.

== Demographics ==
As of the 2011 census of India, Khairwa had a population of 497 in 88 households. Males constitute 53.72% of the population and females 46.27%. Khairwa has an average literacy rate of 37.2%, lower than the national average of 74%: male literacy is 67%, and female literacy is 32%. In Khairwa, 22.33% of the population is under 6 years of age.
