= Laukaria =

- Village
- Location within Bihar
- Coordinates: 27.108°N 84.464°E
- Country: India
- State: Bihar
- District: West Champaran district

Languages
  - Official: Hindi
- Time zone: UTC+5:30 (IST)
- ISO 3166 code: IN-BR

Laukaria is a village in West Champaran district in the Indian state of Bihar.

== Demographics ==
As of the 2011 census of India, Laukaria had a population of 1348 in 245 households. Males constitute 52.4% of the population and females 47.5%. Laukaria has an average literacy rate of 35.68%, lower than the national average of 74%: male literacy is 61.74%, and female literacy is 38.25%. In Laukaria, 23.81% of the population is under 6 years of age.
