= Balua, Bihar =

Balua Bazar
- Village
- Location within Bihar
- Coordinates: 27.108°N 84.464°E
- Country: India
- State: Bihar
- District: West Champaran district

Government
  - Type: Panchayati raj (India)
  - Body: Gram panchayat

Languages
  - Official: Hindi
- Time zone: UTC+5:30 (IST)
- Postal code: 802351
- ISO 3166 code: IN-BR

Balua is a village in West Champaran district in the Indian state of Bihar.

== Demographics ==
As of the 2011 census of India, Balua had a population of 326 in 56 households. Males constitute 53.37% of the population and females 46.61%. Balua has an average literacy rate of 48.77%, lower than the national average of 74%: male literacy is 57.23%, and female literacy is 42.76%. In Balua, 18.4% of the population is under 6 years of age.
