= Dhumnagiar =

- Village
- Location within Bihar
- Coordinates: 27.108°N 84.464°E
- Country: India
- State: Bihar
- District: West Champaran district

Languages
  - Official: Hindi
- Time zone: UTC+5:30 (IST)
- ISO 3166 code: IN-BR

Dhumnagiar is a village in West Champaran district in the Indian state of Bihar.

== Demographics ==
As of the 2011 census of India, Dhumnagiar had a population of 5288 in 949 households. Males constitute 52.49% of the population and females 47.5%. Dhumnagiar has an average literacy rate of 43.75%, lower than the national average of 74%: male literacy is 62.1%, and female literacy is 37.8%. In Dhumnagiar, 21% of the population is under 6 years of age.
