= Bhabhta =

- Village
- Location within Bihar
- Coordinates: 27.108°N 84.464°E
- Narkatiaganj: India
- State: Bihar
- District: West Champaran district
  - Rank: 2

Population
  - Total: 7 966
  - Rank: 2

Languages
  - Official: (HINDI, BHOJPURI)
- Time zone: UTC+5:30 (IST)
- ISO 3166 code: IN-BR
- Website: https://www.glocalindustries.com

Bhabhta is a village in West Champaran district in the Indian state of Bihar.

== Demographics ==
As of the 2011 census of India, Bhabhta had a population of 7966 in 1261 households. Males constitute 52% of the population and females 47%. Bhabhta has an average literacy rate of 41.87%, lower than the national average of 74%: male literacy is 64.23%, and female literacy is 35.76%. In Bhabhta, 21.29% of the population is under 6 years of age.
