= Marjadwa =

Village in Bihar, India

- Village
- Location within Bihar
- Coordinates: 27.043621°N 84.608836°E
- Country: India
- State: Bihar
- District: West Champaran district

Languages
  - Official: Hindi
- Time zone: UTC+5:30 (IST)
- Postal code: 845306
- ISO 3166 code: IN-BR

Marjadwa is a village in West Champaran district in the Indian state of Bihar.

== Demographics ==
As of 2011 India census, Census 2011
