= Odarwa =

- Village
- Location within Bihar
- Coordinates: 27.108°N 84.464°E
- Country: India
- State: Bihar
- District: West Champaran district

Languages
  - Official: Hindi
- Time zone: UTC+5:30 (IST)
- ISO 3166 code: IN-BR

Odarwa is a village in West Champaran district in the Indian state of Bihar.

== Demographics ==
As of the 2011 census of India, Odarwa had a population of 2235 in 312 households. Males constitute 52.6% of the population and females 47.3%. Odarwa has an average literacy rate of 33.6%, lower than the national average of 74%: male literacy is 70.6%, and female literacy is 29.3%. In Odarwa, 21.7% of the population is under 6 years of age.
