= Birendra Prasad Gupta =

Indian politician

Member of Bihar Legislative Assembly
- In office 2020–2025
- Preceded by: Khurshid Urf Firoj Ahmad
- Succeeded by: Sammridh Varma
- Constituency: Sikta

Personal details
- Party: CPI(M–L)L
- Occupation: Politician

Birendra Prasad Gupta is an Indian politician from Bihar and a Member of the Bihar Legislative Assembly. Gupta won the Sikta Assembly constituency on the CPI(M–L)L ticket in the 2020 Bihar Legislative Assembly election, defeating Janata Dal (United) MLA Khurshid Urf Firoj Ahmad.

In past he contested 2010 and 2015 Bihar Legislative Assembly also as candidate of CPI(M–L)L but couldn't win.

He also contested 2014 Indian general election from Valmiki Nagar Lok Sabha constituency as a candidate of CPI(M–L)L but failed.

Birendra Prasad Gupta has done I.Sc. from Bihar Intermediate Council Patna in 1981-83 and belongs to Diuliya near Narkatiaganj.
