= Bargajwa village =

Bargajwa
- Village
- Location within Bihar Location within India
- Coordinates: 27.108°N 84.464°E
- Country: India
- State: Bihar
- District: West Champaran district

Government
  - Type: Panchayati raj (India)
  - Body: Gram panchayat

Languages
  - Official: Hindi
- Time zone: UTC+5:30 (IST)
- ISO 3166 code: IN-BR

Bargajwa is a village in West Champaran district in the Indian state of Bihar.

== Demographics ==
As of the 2011 census of India, Bargajwa had a population of 3463 in 705 households. Males constitute 52.95% of the population and females 47%. Bargajwa has an average literacy rate of 41.75%, lower than the national average of 74%: male literacy is 63.34%, and female literacy is 36.65%. In Bargajwa, 19.17% of the population is under 6 years of age.
