= Majharia, Bihar =

Majharia
- Village
- Location within Bihar
- Coordinates: 27.108°N 84.464°E
- Country: India
- State: Bihar
- District: West Champaran district

Languages
  - Official: Hindi
- Time zone: UTC+5:30 (IST)
- ISO 3166 code: IN-BR

Majharia is a village in the West Champaran district of the Indian state of Bihar.

== Demographics ==
As of the 2011 census of India, Majharia had a population of 1942 in 391 households. Males constituted 52.26% of the population and females 47.73%. It had an average literacy rate of 39.49%, lower than the national average of 74%; male literacy was 64.14% and female literacy was 35.85%. 22.5% of the population was under 6 years of age.
