= Nankar =

- Village
- Location within Bihar
- Coordinates: 27.108°N 84.464°E
- Country: India
- State: Bihar
- District: West Champaran district

Languages
  - Official: Hindi
- Time zone: UTC+5:30 (IST)
- ISO 3166 code: IN-BR

Nankar is a village in West Champaran district in the Indian state of Bihar.

== Demographics ==
As of the 2011 census of India, Nankar had a population of 1339 in 277 households. Males constitute 52.5% of the population and females 47.4%. Nankar has an average literacy rate of 32.3%, lower than the national average of 74%: male literacy is 68.1%, and female literacy is 31.8%. In Nankar, 23.9% of the population is under 6 years of age.
