= Purainia =

- Village
- Location within Bihar
- Coordinates: 27.108°N 84.464°E
- Country: India
- State: Bihar
- District: West Champaran district

Languages
  - Official: Hindi
- Time zone: UTC+5:30 (IST)
- ISO 3166 code: IN-BR

Purainia is a village in West Champaran district in the Indian state of Bihar.

== Demographics ==
As of the 2011 census of India, Purainia had a population of 3538 in 653 households. Males constitute 51.75% of the population and females 48.24%. Purainia has an average literacy rate of 48.9%, lower than the national average of 74%: male literacy is 62%, and female literacy is 37.9%. In Purainia, 21.6% of the population is under 6 years of age.

== Locations and Facilities ==
The village is home to a hotel, a welding shop, a playground, a middle school, multiple stores, and a restaurant.
