= Katahri =

- Village
- Location within Bihar
- Coordinates: 27.108°N 84.464°E
- Country: India
- State: Bihar
- District: West Champaran district

Languages
  - Official: Hindi
- Time zone: UTC+5:30 (IST)
- ISO 3166 code: IN-BR

Katahri is a village in the West Champaran district of the Indian state of Bihar.

== Demographics ==
As of the 2011 census of India, Katahri had a population of 3408 in 559 households. Males constitute 52.61% of the population and females 47.38%. Katahri has an average literacy rate of 55.28%, lower than the national average of 74%: male literacy is 61.83%, and female literacy is 38.16%. In Katahri, 18.75% of the population is under 6 years of age.
