= Harsari =

- Village
- Location within Bihar
- Coordinates: 27.108°N 84.464°E
- Country: India
- State: Bihar
- District: West Champaran district

Languages
  - Official: Hindi, Bhojpuri
- Time zone: UTC+5:30 (IST)
- ISO 3166 code: IN-BR

Harsari is a village in West Champaran district in the Indian state of Bihar.

== Demographics ==
As of the 2011 census of India, Harsari had a population of 1718 in 289 households. Males constitute 51.39% of the population and females 48.6%. Harsari has an average literacy rate of 54%, lower than the national average of 74%: male literacy is 64.47%, and female literacy is 35.52%. In Harsari, 19.9% of the population is under 6 years of age.
