= Nautan Dube =

Village in Bihar, India

- Village
- Location within Bihar Location within India
- Coordinates: 26°42′50″N 84°28′05″E
- Country: India
- State: Bihar
- District: Pashchim Champaran
- Block: Nautan

Government
  - Type: Sarpanch

Area
  - Total: 17.82 km^{2} (6.88 sq mi)
- Elevation: 77 m (253 ft)

Population (2011)
  - Total: 31,190
  - Density: 1,750/km^{2} (4,533/sq mi)

Languages
  - Local: Bhojpuri, Hindi
- Time zone: UTC+5:30 (IST)
- PIN: 845438
- STD code: 06253
- Vehicle registration: BR-22

Nautan Dube is a village in Pashchim Champaran district in the Indian state of Bihar. It is located near the state border with Uttar Pradesh, about 11 kilometres southwest of the district headquarter Bettiah. It had a population of 31,190 according to the 2011 census.

== Geography ==
Nautan Dube lies to the east of the Gandaki River, with a pond named Satkund on the western part of the village. It has an area of 1781.8 hectares.

== Demographics ==
As of 2011 India census, Nautan Dube had a population of 31,190 in 6,042 households. The male population was 16,271 while the female population was 14,919. The working population constituted 32.95% of the total population. Nautan Dube has an average literacy rate of 32.50%, with 7,960 of the male inhabitants and 4,848 of the female inhabitants being literate.
