= Bahuarwa, Bihar =

Bahuarwa
- Village
- Location within Bihar
- Coordinates: 27.108°N 84.464°E
- Country: India
- State: Bihar
- District: West Champaran district

Languages
  - Official: Hindi
- Time zone: UTC+5:30 (IST)
- ISO 3166 code: IN-BR

Bahuarwa is a village in West Champaran district in the Indian state of Bihar.

== Demographics ==
As of the 2011 census of India, Bahuarwa had a population of 1,025 in 218 households. Males constitute 52.97% of the population and females 47%. Bahuarwa has an average literacy rate of 55.80%, lower than the national average of 74%: male literacy is 62.41%, and female literacy is 37.58%. In Bahuarwa, 20.78% of the population is under 6 years of age.
