= Parsa Nagar Halt railway station =

Railway station in Bihar, India

Parsa Nagar Halt

General information
- Location: Parsa Nagar, West Champaran district, Bihar; India
- Coordinates: 26°46′35″N 84°41′13″E
- Elevation: 74 m (243 ft)
- System: Passenger train station
- Owner: Indian Railways
- Operator: East Central Railway
- Line: Muzaffarpur–Gorakhpur main line
- Platforms: 1
- Tracks: 2

Construction
- Structure type: Standard (on ground station)

Other information
- Status: Active
- Station code: PRSN
- Zone(s): East Central Railway zone
- Division(s): Samastipur

History
- Opened: 1930s

Services
Preceding station	Indian Railways	Following station
Majhowlia towards ?	East Central Railway zone Muzaffarpur–Gorakhpur main line	Sagauli Junction towards ?
Location

Parsa Nagar Halt railway station (station code: PRSN), is a halt railway station on Muzaffarpur–Gorakhpur main line under the Samastipur railway division of East Central Railway zone. This is situated at Parsa Nagar in West Champaran district of the Indian state of Bihar.
