= Dhaminha =

- Village
- Location within Bihar
- Coordinates: 27.108°N 84.464°E
- Country: India
- State: Bihar
- District: West Champaran district

Languages
  - Official: Hindi
- Time zone: UTC+5:30 (IST)
- ISO 3166 code: IN-BR

Dhaminha is a village in West Champaran district in the Indian state of Bihar.

== Demographics ==
As of the 2011 census of India, Dhaminha had a population of 2456 in 437 households. Males constitute 52.64% of the population and females 47.35%. Dhaminha has an average literacy rate of 46.29%, lower than the national average of 74%: male literacy is 63.23%, and female literacy is 36.76%. In Dhaminha, 20.31% of the population is under 6 years of age.
