= Auraia =

- Village
- Location within Bihar Location within India
- Coordinates: 27.108°N 84.464°E
- Country: India
- State: Bihar
- District: West Champaran district

Languages
  - Official: Hindi
- Time zone: UTC+5:30 (IST)
- ISO 3166 code: IN-BR

Auraia is a village in West Champaran district in the Indian state of Bihar.

== Demographics ==
As of the 2011 census of India, Auraia had a population of 486 in 85 households. Males constitute 54.32% of the population and females 45.67%. Auraia has an average literacy rate of 40.25%, lower than the national average of 74%: male literacy is 44.96%, and female literacy is 55%. In Auraia, 25% of the population is under 6 years of age.
