= Bhataura =

- Village
- Location within Bihar Location within India
- Coordinates: 27.108°N 84.464°E
- Country: India
- State: Bihar
- District: West Champaran district

Languages
  - Official: Hindi
- Time zone: UTC+5:30 (IST)
- Postal code: 845451
- ISO 3166 code: IN-BR
- Vehicle registration: BR

Bhataura is a village in West Champaran district in the Indian state of Bihar. Narkatiaganj is the nearest city and police station of Bhataura.

== Demographics ==
As of the 2011 census of India, Bhataura had a population of 2059 in 403 households. Males constituted 51.62% of the population and females 48.37%. Bhataura had an average literacy rate of 42.44%, lower than the national average of 74%: male literacy was 62%, and female literacy was 37%. In Bhataura, 22% of the population was under 6 years of age.
