= Lediharwa =

- Village
- Location within Bihar
- Coordinates: 27.108°N 84.464°E
- Country: India
- State: Bihar
- District: West Champaran district

Languages
  - Official: Hindi
- Time zone: UTC+5:30 (IST)
- ISO 3166 code: IN-BR

Lediharwa is a village in West Champaran district in the Indian state of Bihar.

== Demographics ==
As of the 2011 census of India, Lediharwa had a population of 778 in 142 households. Males constitute 51.54% of the population and females 48.45%. Lediharwa has an average literacy rate of 38.81%, lower than the national average of 74%: male literacy is 65.23%, and female literacy is 34.76%. In Lediharwa, 23.65% of the population is under 6 years of age.
