= Bijbania =

- Village
- Location within Bihar
- Coordinates: 27.108°N 84.464°E
- Country: India
- State: Bihar
- District: West Champaran district

Languages
  - Official: Hindi
- Time zone: UTC+5:30 (IST)
- ISO 3166 code: IN-BR

Bijbania is a village in West Champaran district in the Indian state of Bihar.

== Demographics ==
As of the 2011 census of India, Bijbania had a population of 407 in 86 households. Males constitute 53.8% of the population and female 46.1%. Bijbania has an average literacy rate of 49.14%, lower than the national average of 74%: male literacy is 71.5%, and female literacy is 28.4%. In Bijbania, 16.21% of the population is under 6 years of age.
