= Mathia Nisf =

- Village
- Location within Bihar
- Coordinates: 27.108°N 84.464°E
- Country: India
- State: Bihar
- District: West Champaran district

Languages
  - Official: Hindi
- Time zone: UTC+5:30 (IST)
- ISO 3166 code: IN-BR

Mathia Nisf is a village in West Champaran district in the Indian state of Bihar.

== Demographics ==
As of the 2011 census of India, Mathia Nisf had a population of 912 in 177 households. Males constitute 54.16% of the population and females 45.83%. Mathia Nisf has an average literacy rate of 50.9%, lower than the national average of 74%: male literacy is 58.7%, and female literacy is 41.2%. In Mathia Nisf, 17.32% of the population is under 6 years of age.
