= Bargon =

- Village
- Location within Bihar Location within India
- Coordinates: 27.108°N 84.464°E
- Country: India
- State: Bihar
- District: West Champaran district

Languages
  - Official: Hindi
- Time zone: UTC+5:30 (IST)
- ISO 3166 code: IN-BR

Bargon is a village in West Champaran district in the Indian state of Bihar.

== Demographics ==
As of the 2011 census of India, Bargon had a population of 1008 in 212 households. Males constitute 51.19% of the population and females 48.8%. Bargon has an average literacy rate of 37.9%, lower than the national average of 74%: male literacy is 53%, and female literacy is 47%. In Bargon, 20% of the population is under 6 years of age.
