= Bairia, Mainatanr =

Bairia
- Village
- Location within Bihar
- Coordinates: 27.1339°N 84.6593°E
- Country: India
- State: Bihar
- District: West Champaran district

Government
  - Type: Panchayati raj (India)
  - Body: Gram panchayat

Languages
  - Official: Hindi
- Time zone: UTC+5:30 (IST)
- ISO 3166 code: IN-BR

Bairia is a village in Mainatanr block, West Champaran district in the Indian state of Bihar.

== Demographics ==
As of the 2011 census of India, Bairia had a population of 512 in 76 households.
