= Nautanwa, Bihar =

Nautanwa
- Village
- Location within Bihar
- Coordinates: 27.108°N 84.464°E
- Country: India
- State: Bihar
- District: West Champaran district

Languages
  - Official: Hindi
- Time zone: UTC+5:30 (IST)
- ISO 3166 code: IN-BR

Nautanwa is a village in West Champaran district in the Indian state of Bihar.

== Demographics ==
As of the 2011 census of India, Nautanwa had a population of 6783 in 1080 households. Males constitute 52.59% of the population and females 47.4%. Nautanwa has an average literacy rate of 55%, lower than the national average of 74%: male literacy is 64.1%, and female literacy is 35.8%. In Nautanwa, 22.6% of the population is under 6 years of age.

Nautanwa is situated 15 km from Narkatia Ganj and nearest railway station is Narkati Ganj PIN code is 845451. District headquarter of nautanwa is Bettiah west champaran Bihar and distance is 55 KM. & nearest degree college is T.P.Varma College Narkatiaganj.
