= Banwaria =

- Village
- Location within Bihar
- Coordinates: 27.108°N 84.464°E
- Country: India
- State: Bihar
- District: West Champaran district

Languages
  - Official: Hindi
- Time zone: UTC+5:30 (IST)
- ISO 3166 code: IN-BR

Banwaria is a village in West Champaran district in the Indian state of Bihar.

== Demographics ==
As of the 2011 census of India, Banwaria had a population of 2230 in 398 households. Males constitute 52.87% of the population and females 47.13%. Banwaria has an average literacy rate of 42.82%, lower than the national average of 74%: male literacy is 63.76%, and female literacy is 36.23%. In Banwaria, 19.46% of the population is under 6 years of age.
