= Bairia, West Champaran =

Bairia
- Village
- Location within Bihar
- Coordinates: 27.108°N 84.464°E
- Country: India
- State: Bihar
- District: West Champaran district

Languages
  - Official: Hindi
- Time zone: UTC+5:30 (IST)
- ISO 3166 code: IN-BR

Bairia is a block and a village in West Champaran district in the Indian state of Bihar.

== Demographics ==
=== Bairia block ===
The census town of Hat Saraiya and 51 villages comprise Bairia block in West Champaran.

==== Bairia village ====
As of the 2011 census of India, Bairia had a population of 13,324 in 2570 households.

==== Other villages ====
- Macchargawan
