= Gobardhana =

- Village
- Location within Bihar
- Coordinates: 27.108°N 84.464°E
- Country: India
- State: Bihar
- District: West Champaran district

Languages
  - Official: Hindi
- Time zone: UTC+5:30 (IST)
- ISO 3166 code: IN-BR

Gobardhana is a village in West Champaran district in the Indian state of Bihar.

== Demographics ==
As of the 2011 census of India, Gobardhana had a population of 1486 in 266 households. Males constitute 53.63% of the population and females 46.36%. Gobardhana has an average literacy rate of 42.79%, lower than the national average of 74%: male literacy is 63.83%, and female literacy is 36.16%. In Gobardhana, 20.72% of the population is under 6 years of age.
