= Marhia =

- Village
- Location within Bihar
- Coordinates: 27.108°N 84.464°E
- Country: India
- State: Bihar
- District: West Champaran district

Languages
  - Official: Hindi
- Time zone: UTC+5:30 (IST)
- ISO 3166 code: IN-BR

Marhia is a village in West Champaran district in the Indian state of Bihar.

== Demographics ==
As of the 2011 census of India, Marhia had a population of 4120 in 759 households. Males constitute 52.1% of the population and females 47.8%. Marhia has an average literacy rate of 38.2%, lower than the national average of 74%: male literacy is 57%, and female literacy is 42%. In Marhia, 19.49% of the population is under 6 years of age.
