= Mathia, Bihar =

Mathia
- Village
- Location within Bihar
- Coordinates: 27.108°N 84.464°E
- Country: India
- State: Bihar
- District: West Champaran district

Languages
  - Official: Hindi
- Time zone: UTC+5:30 (IST)
- ISO 3166 code: IN-BR

Mathia is a village in the West Champaran district in the Indian state of Bihar.

== Demographics ==
As of the 2011 census of India, Mathia had a population of 388 in 82 households. Males constitute 49.74% of the population and females 50.25%. Mathia has an average literacy rate of 25.51%, lower than the national average of 74%: male literacy is 53.5%, and female literacy is 46.4%. In Mathia, 19.32% of the population is under 6 years of age.
