= Belwa, East Champaran =

Belwa
- Village
- Location within Bihar Location within India
- Coordinates: 27.108°N 84.464°E
- Country: India
- State: Bihar
- District: West Champaran district

Government
  - Type: Panchayati raj (India)
  - Body: Gram panchayat

Languages
  - Official: Hindi, Maithili & Bhojpuri
- Time zone: UTC+5:30 (IST)
- Postal code: 845302
- ISO 3166 code: IN-BR

Belwa is a village in West Champaran district in the Indian state of Bihar. It is situated on the bank of Pandaye river. It is most famous for Mangoes, Sugarcane and the Paddy fields. Most of the people make their living by farming and they depend mostly on rain.

== Demographics ==
As of the 2011 census of India, Belwa had a population of 5525 in 995 households. Males constitute 52.27% of the population and females 47.72%. Belwa has an average literacy rate of 36.6%, lower than the national average of 74%: male literacy is 62.53%, and female literacy is 37.46%. In Belwa, 21.8% of the population is under 6 years of age.
