= Bishunpurwa (census code 216586) =

- Village
- Location within Bihar Location within India
- Coordinates: 27.108°N 84.464°E
- Country: India
- State: Bihar
- District: West Champaran district

Government
  - Type: Panchayati raj (India)
  - Body: Gram panchayat

Languages
  - Official: Hindi
- Time zone: UTC+5:30 (IST)
- ISO 3166 code: IN-BR

Bishunpurwa is a village in Narkatiaganj block of West Champaran district in the Indian state of Bihar.

== Demographics ==
As of the 2011 census of India, Bishunpurwa had a population of 2,850 in 531 households. Males constitute 52.73% of the population and females 47.26%. Bishunpurwa has an average literacy rate of 37.33%, lower than the national average of 74%: male literacy is 60.5%, and female literacy is 39.4%. In Bishunpurwa, 22.5% of the population is under 6 years of age.
