= Pitamber Sinha =

Indian politician

Pitamber Sinha was an Indian politician and leader of Communist Party of India.

He represented the Bettiah Lok Sabha constituency from 1980 to 1984.
