= Baitapur =

- Village
- Location within Bihar
- Coordinates: 27.108°N 84.464°E
- Country: India
- State: Bihar
- District: West Champaran district

Languages
  - Official: Bhojpuri and Hindi
- Time zone: UTC+5:30 (IST)
- ISO 3166 code: IN-BR

Baitapur is a village in West Champaran district in the Indian state of Bihar.

== Demographics ==
As of the 2011 census of India, Baitapur had a population of 1856 in 362 households. Males constitute 50.53% of the population and females 49.46%. Baitapur has an average literacy rate of 72%, lower than the national average of 74%: male literacy is about 65%, and female literacy is 40.65%. In Baitapur, 19.55% of the population is under 6 years of age. Ram Janki Mandir situated in West side is best remarkable place in Baitapur.
