= Mujauna, Shikarpur =

Mujauna
- Village
- Location within Bihar
- Coordinates: 27.108°N 84.464°E
- Country: India
- State: Bihar
- District: West Champaran district
- Block: Narkatiaganj
- Panchayat: Shikarpur

Languages
  - Official: Hindi
- Time zone: UTC+5:30 (IST)
- ISO 3166 code: IN-BR

Mujauna is a village in the West Champaran district in the Indian state of Bihar. It comes under the Shikarpur panchayat of Narkatiaganj block.

== Demographics ==
As of the 2011 census of India, Mujauna had a population of 901 in 121 households. Males constitute 52% of the population and females 47%. Mujauna has an average literacy rate of 42%, lower than the national average of 74%: male literacy is 67.28%, and female literacy is 32.71%. In Mujauna, 20.4% of the population is under 6 years of age.
