= Madan Mohan Tiwari =

Indian politician

Madan Mohan Tiwari (born 1967) is an Indian National Congress politician from the state of Bihar, in India. He is a former member of the Bihar Legislative Assembly in 2015 from the Bettiah Assembly constituency in West Champaran district.

== Early life and education ==
Tiwari is from Bettiah, West Champaran district, Bihar. He is the son of Swaminath Tiwari. He completed his MA in 1990 at MJK College, Bettiah and later did LLB at MS College, Brabu in 2000.

== Career ==
He contested the 2010 Bihar Legislative Assembly election on an Indian National Congress ticket but lost. He won the 2015 Bihar Legislative Assembly election from Bettiah Assembly constituency representing the Indian National Congress. He fought the 2020 Bihar Legislative Assembly election though lost. Later, he also contested the 2024 Paschim Champaran Lok Sabha election but lost to Sanjay Jiswal of the Bharatiya Janata Party.
