= Amolwa railway station =

Railway station in West Champaran, Bihar, India

General information
- Location: West Champaran district, Bihar; India
- Coordinates: 27.2118°N 84.4779°E
- Elevation: 92 metres (302 ft)
- System: Indian Railways station
- Owner: Indian Railways
- Operator: East Central Railway
- Line: Narkatiaganj–Bhikhna Thori branch line
- Platforms: 1
- Tracks: 2
- Connections: Auto stand

Construction
- Structure type: Standard (on ground station)
- Parking: No
- Cycle facilities: No

Other information
- Status: Functioning
- Station code: AMO
- Zone(s): East Central Railway
- Division(s): Samastipur

Services
Preceding station	Indian Railways	Following station
Narkatiaganj Junction towards ?	Narkatiaganj–Bhikhna Thori branch line	Bhitiharwa Ashram towards ?
Route map
Location
- Location within India Location within Bihar

Amolwa railway station is a small railway station on Narkatiaganj–Bhikhna Thori branch line in West Champaran district, Bihar. Its code is AMO. It serves Amolwa village.

Amolwa railway station is connected with the Barauni–Gorakhpur, Raxaul and Jainagar lines at Narkatiaganj Junction, 13 km away.

== Gauge conversion ==
Presently services are suspended on Narkatiaganj–Bhikhna Thori branch line since 2015, as it is undergoing gauge conversion, from metre to 5 ft 6 in (1,676 mm) broad gauge. It is expected that the first stretch between Narkatiaganj Junction and Amolwa (13 km) to be completed in March 2020 and by June 2020, up to Gawnaha station (23 km). The last section between Gawnaha and Bhikhna Thori (13 km) passes through dense forest and needs a special permit from the Forest Department allowing construction works. As of August 2019, the permit has not been given. According to the Forest Department, Gawnaha – Bhikhna Thori section should be closed and the railway land transferred to them.
