= Sagir Ahmad =

Indian politician

Member of Bihar Legislative Assembly
- In office 1972–1990
- Preceded by: Radha Pandey
- Succeeded by: Raj Nandan Rai
- Constituency: Raxaul

Personal details
- Parent: Mohamad Jahirhasan (father)

Sagir Ahmad was an Indian politician affiliated with the Indian National Congress (INC). He served as the Member of Legislative Assembly (MLA) for the Raxaul Assembly constituency in the Bihar Legislative Assembly for four consecutive terms, representing the East Champaran district from 1972 to 1990.
