= Raxaul Assembly constituency =

Coordinates: 26°58′52″N 84°51′11″E

Raxaul
- Constituency No. 10 for the Bihar Legislative Assembly

Constituency details
- Country: India
- Region: East India
- State: Bihar
- District: East Champaran
- Lok Sabha constituency: 2. Paschim Champaran
- Established: 1951
- Total electors: 286,131
- Reservation: None

Member of Legislative Assembly
- 18th Bihar Legislative Assembly
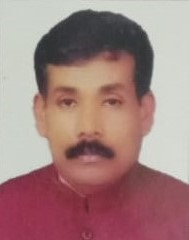
- Incumbent Pramod Kumar Sinha
- Party: BJP
- Alliance: NDA
- Elected year: 2025
- Preceded by: Ajay Kumar Singh

Raxaul Assembly constituency is an assembly constituency in East Champaran district in the Indian state of Bihar. The current Member of Legislative Assembly is Pramod Kumar Sinha.

== Overview ==
As per orders of Delimitation of Parliamentary and Assembly constituencies Order, 2008, 10. Raxaul Assembly constituency is composed of the following: Raxaul and Adapur community development blocks.

Raxaul Assembly constituency is part of 2. Paschim Champaran (Lok Sabha constituency). It was earlier part of Bettiah (Lok Sabha constituency).

== Members of the Legislative Assembly ==
Year	Name	Party
1952	Radha Pandey	Indian National Congress
1957	Radha Pandey	Indian National Congress
1962	Radha Pandey	Indian National Congress
1967	Vidhyachal Sinha	Samyukta Socialist Party
1969	Radha Pandey	Indian National Congress
1972	Sagir Ahmad	Indian National Congress
1977	Sagir Ahmad	Indian National Congress
1980	Sagir Ahmad	Indian National Congress (I)
1985	Sagir Ahmad	Indian National Congress
1990	Raj Nandan Rai	Janata Dal
1995	Raj Nandan Rai	Janata Dal
2000	Ajay Kumar Singh	Bharatiya Janata Party
2005	Ajay Kumar Singh	Bharatiya Janata Party
2005	Ajay Kumar Singh	Bharatiya Janata Party
2010	Ajay Kumar Singh	Bharatiya Janata Party
2015	Ajay Kumar Singh	Bharatiya Janata Party
2020	Pramod Kumar Sinha	Bharatiya Janata Party
2025	Pramod Kumar Sinha	Bharatiya Janata Party

== Election results ==
=== 2025 ===
2025 Bihar Legislative Assembly election: Raxaul
Party	Candidate	Votes	%	±%
BJP	Pramod Kumar Sinha	106,765	49.55	+3.95
INC	Shyam Bihari Prasad	88,887	41.26	+16.45
JSP	Kapil Dev Prasad	14,656	6.8	
NOTA	None of the above	2,510	1.17	−0.4
Majority		17,878	8.29	−12.5
Turnout		215,448	75.3	+11.43
BJP hold		Swing		

=== 2020 ===
2020 Bihar Legislative Assembly election: Raxaul
Party	Candidate	Votes	%	±%
BJP	Pramod Kumar Sinha	80,979	45.6	+5.79
INC	Rambabu Yadav	44,056	24.81	
Independent	Suresh Kumar	28,593	16.1	
BSP	Ajay Kumar Singh	12,267	6.91	+5.88
Independent	Mustaque Ali	2,236	1.26	
Independent	Arbind Prasad Sah	2,197	1.24	
NOTA	None of the above	2,784	1.57	−0.47
Majority		36,923	20.79	+18.85
Turnout		177,583	63.87	+0.85
BJP hold		Swing		

=== 2015 ===
2015 Bihar Legislative Assembly election: Raxaul
Party	Candidate	Votes	%	±%
BJP	Ajay Kumar Singh	64,731	39.81	
RJD	Suresh Kumar	61,562	37.87	
Independent	Shyam Bihari Prasad	21,697	13.35	
SP	Kapildev Ray	3,073	1.89	
Garib Janta Dal (Secular)	Parmanand Prasad	1,952	1.2	
BSP	Chandra Kishor Pal	1,681	1.03	
Independent	Mithilesh Yadav	1,481	0.91	
NOTA	None of the above	3,310	2.04	
Majority		3,169	1.94	
Turnout		162,582	63.02	
BJP hold		Swing		

=== 2010 ===
2010 Bihar Legislative Assembly election: Raxaul
Party	Candidate	Votes	%	±%
BJP	Ajay Kumar Singh	48,686	42.91	
LJP	Raj Nandan Rai	38,569	33.99	
INC	Rambabu Prasad Yadav	9,691	8.54	
BSP	Pramanand Prasad	7,683	6.77	
Majority		10,117	8.92	
Turnout		1,13,455	54.00	
BJP hold		Swing		
