= Thakraha =

Town in Bihar, India

Thakraha Thakrahan
- Town
- Location within Bihar Location within India
- Coordinates: 26°45′40″N 84°15′45″E
- Country: India
- State: Bihar
- District: Pashchim Champaran
- Block: Thakrahan

Government
  - Type: Sarpanch

Area
  - Total: 37.07 km^{2} (14.31 sq mi)
- Elevation: 78 m (256 ft)

Population (2011)
  - Total: 35,734
  - Density: 964.0/km^{2} (2,497/sq mi)

Languages
  - Official: Hindi, Maithili
  - Other: Urdu, Bhojpuri, English
- Time zone: UTC+5:30 (IST)
- PIN: 845459
- Telephone code: 06254
- Vehicle registration: BR-22

Thakraha, or Thakrahan, is a town and the seat of government of Thakrahan Block, Pashchim Champaran, Bihar, India. It is located near the state border with Uttar Pradesh, about 25 kilometres west of the district seat Bettiah. In the year 2011, the town has a total population of 35,734.

== Geography ==
Thakraha is situated on the southern bank of Gandaki River. The village of Ramnagar Kursaha is located on its north, Bhagwanpur on its east, Razpur Bagaha on its south, and Gauri Jagdish on its west. Its average elevation is 78 metres above the sea level.

== Climate ==
Thakraha has a humid subtropical climate (Cwa). It sees the most rainfall in July, with 394 mm of precipitation; and the least rainfall in November, with 4 mm of precipitation.

Climate data for Thakraha
Month	Jan	Feb	Mar	Apr	May	Jun	Jul	Aug	Sep	Oct	Nov	Dec	Year
Mean daily maximum °C (°F)	21.8 (71.2)	25.7 (78.3)	31.8 (89.2)	36.5 (97.7)	36.3 (97.3)	34.6 (94.3)	31.4 (88.5)	31.4 (88.5)	30.8 (87.4)	30 (86)	27.7 (81.9)	23.6 (74.5)	30.1 (86.2)
Daily mean °C (°F)	15.8 (60.4)	19.3 (66.7)	24.8 (76.6)	29.7 (85.5)	30.7 (87.3)	30.2 (86.4)	28.2 (82.8)	28.1 (82.6)	27.4 (81.3)	25.4 (77.7)	21.8 (71.2)	17.5 (63.5)	24.9 (76.8)
Mean daily minimum °C (°F)	10.1 (50.2)	13 (55)	17.6 (63.7)	22.7 (72.9)	25.1 (77.2)	26.2 (79.2)	25.8 (78.4)	25.7 (78.3)	24.7 (76.5)	21 (70)	16.1 (61.0)	11.7 (53.1)	20.0 (68.0)
Average rainfall mm (inches)	13 (0.5)	19 (0.7)	16 (0.6)	38 (1.5)	119 (4.7)	284 (11.2)	447 (17.6)	373 (14.7)	314 (12.4)	79 (3.1)	5 (0.2)	7 (0.3)	1,714 (67.5)
Source: Climate-Data.org

== Demographics ==
According to the 2011 Census of India, Thakraha has 5,963 households. Out of the 35,734 residents, 18,493 are male and 17,241 are female. The overall literacy rate is 41.57%, with 9,511 of the male population and 5,343 of the female population being literate. Its census location code is 217038.
