= Macchargawan =

Coordinates: 26.9064°N 84.3809°E

Machhargawan is a Nagar Panchayat in Jogapatti block of West Champaran district in the Indian state of Bihar. The West Champaran district administration lists Machhargawan Nagar Panchayat among the district's municipalities.

The Nagar Panchayat covers an area of approximately 2.08 square kilometres and has a population of 22,680. It is divided into 15 wards. The postal PIN code of Machhargawan is 845452.

The Bihar State Election Commission lists Machhergawan (Yogapatti) as a Nagar Panchayat with 15 wards and a population of 22,680.

The Nagar Panchayat's official website identifies the area as being in West Champaran district and gives its PIN code as 845452.
