= Bettiah Lok Sabha constituency =

Former Lok Sabha Constituency in Bihar

Coordinates: 26.8°N 84.5°E

Bettiah
- Former Lok Sabha constituency

Constituency details
- Country: India
- Region: East India
- State: Bihar
- Assembly constituencies: Chanpatia, Bettiah, Nautan, Raxaul, Sugauli and Adapur
- Established: 1962
- Abolished: 2009
- Reservation: None

Bettiah was a Lok Sabha constituency in Bihar. It had its first election in 1962 and was abolished after the passing of the Delimitation of Parliamentary and Assembly Constituencies Order, 2008.

== Members of Parliament ==
Year	Name	Party
1952-61 : Constituency did not exist
1962	Kamal Nath Tewari	Indian National Congress
1967	Kamal Nath Tewari	Indian National Congress
1971	Kamal Nath Tewari	Indian National Congress
1977	Fazlur Rahman	Janata Party
1980	Pitamber Sinha	Communist Party of India
1984	Manoj Pandey	Indian National Congress
1989	Dharmesh Prasad Varma	Janata Dal
1991	Faiyazul Azam	Janata Dal
1996	Madan Prasad Jaiswal	Bharatiya Janata Party
1998	Madan Prasad Jaiswal	Bharatiya Janata Party
1999	Madan Prasad Jaiswal	Bharatiya Janata Party
2004	Raghunath Jha	Rashtriya Janata Dal
2008 onwards: See Paschim Champaran

== See also ==
- Bettiah
- List of constituencies of the Lok Sabha
