= Satan Yadav =

Indian politician

Member of the Bihar Legislative Assembly
- In office 1995–2000
- Preceded by: Rawakant Diwedi
- Succeeded by: Baidyanath Prasad Mahto
- Constituency: Nautan

Personal details
- Occupation: Politician social work

Satan Yadav (born at Village Balua Rampurwa in Bariya Block of District West Champaran) is an Indian politician who was elected as a member of Bihar Legislative Assembly from Nautan constituency in 1995.He defeated the prominent leader of Janata Dal (United) and former Lok Sabha member Baidyanath Prasad Mahto.

== See also ==
- Nautan Assembly constituency
