= Mujauna, Sugauli =

Mujauna
- Village
- Location within Bihar
- Coordinates: 27.092989°N 84.398018°E
- Country: India
- State: Bihar
- District: West Champaran district
- Block: Narkatiaganj
- Panchayat: Sugauli

Languages
  - Official: Hindi
- Time zone: UTC+5:30 (IST)
- ISO 3166 code: IN-BR

Mujauna is a village in West Champaran district in the Indian state of Bihar. It comes under the Sugauli panchayat of Narkatiaganj block.

== Demographics ==
As of the 2011 census of India, Mujauna had a population of 1993 in 358 households. Males constitute 48.8% of the population and females 51.1%. Mujauna has an average literacy rate of 48.46%, lower than the national average of 74%: male literacy is 58.28%, and female literacy is 41.71%. In Mujauna, 20.9% of the population is under 6 years of age.
