= Sikta Assembly constituency =

Coordinates: 27°11′07″N 84°27′12″E

Sikta
- Constituency No. 9 for the Bihar Legislative Assembly

Constituency details
- Country: India
- Region: East India
- State: Bihar
- District: West Champaran
- Lok Sabha constituency: Valmiki Nagar
- Established: 1951
- Total electors: 278,251

Member of Legislative Assembly
- 18th Bihar Legislative Assembly
- Incumbent Sammridh Varma
- Party: JD(U)
- Alliance: NDA
- Elected year: 2025
- Preceded by: Birendra Prasad Gupta (CPI(ML)L)

Sikta Assembly constituency is an assembly constituency in West Champaran district in the Indian state of Bihar.

== Overview ==
As per orders of Delimitation of Parliamentary and Assembly constituencies Order, 2008, 9. Sikta Assembly constituency is composed of the following: Mainatanr and Sikta community development block; and Barwa Barauli, Somgarh and Bhabhata gram panchayats of Narkatiaganj CD Block.

Sikta Assembly constituency is part of 1. Valmiki Nagar (Lok Sabha constituency).

== Members of the Legislative Assembly ==
Year	Name	Party
1952	Faizul Rahman	Indian National Congress
1957	Faizul Rahman	Indian National Congress
1962	Raiful Azam	Swatantra Party
1967	U. S. Shukla	Communist Party of India
1969	Raiful Azam	Indian National Congress
1972	Faiyazul Azam	Indian National Congress (O)
1977	Faiyazul Azam	Indian National Congress
1980	Dharmesh Prasad Varma	Janata Party
1985	Dharmesh Prasad Varma	Janata Party
1990	Faiyazul Azam	Independent
1991^	Dilip Varma	Independent
1995	Dilip Varma	Champaran Vikas Party
2000	Dilip Varma	Bharatiya Janata Party
2005	Dilip Varma	Samajwadi Party
2005	Firoj Ahmad	Indian National Congress
2010	Dilip Varma	Independent
2015	Firoj Ahmad	Janata Dal (United)
2020	Birendra Prasad Gupta	Communist Party of India (Marxist–Leninist) Liberation
2025	Sammridh Varma	Janata Dal (United)

^by-election

== Election results ==
=== 2025 ===
2025 Bihar Legislative Assembly election: Sikta
Party	Candidate	Votes	%	±%
JD(U)	Sammridh Varma	97,173	46.11	▲25.06
Independent	Firoj Ahmad	50,029	23.74	
CPI(ML)L	Birendra Prasad Gupta	37,431	17.76	▼11.09
JSP	Utkash Srivastava	8,181	3.88	
AAP	Aurangjeb	2,512	1.19	
Independent	Lalgurad Miyan	2,427	1.15	
Rashtriya Jansambhavna Party	Md. Fakhruddin	2,225	1.06	
BSP	Santosh Ram	1,964	0.93	
NOTA	None of the above	4,568	2.17	▲0.98
Majority		47,144	22.37	▲21.02
Turnout		210,762	75.75	▲13.79
JD(U) gain from CPI(ML)L		Swing		

=== 2020 ===
2020 Bihar Legislative Assembly election: Sikta
Party	Candidate	Votes	%	±%
CPI(ML)L	Birendra Prasad Gupta	49,075	28.85	
Independent	Dilip Varma	46,773	27.5	
JD(U)	Firoj Ahmad	35,798	21.05	▼22.43
AIMIM	Rijabanullah Alias Rizwan Riyazi	8,519	5.01	
Independent	Vinay Kumar Yadav	4,160	2.45	
Bhartiya Panchyat Party	Akhileshwar Prasad Alias Jhunu	3,312	1.95	
Independent	Wasi Ahmad	2,686	1.58	
Independent	Hardev Ram	2,588	1.52	
Independent	Ghausul Azam	2,461	1.45	
Peoples Party of India (Democratic)	Rajesh Paswan	2,362	1.39	
The Plurals Party	Tamnna Khatun	2,237	1.32	
NCP	Mainuddin Alam	2,023	1.19	
Independent	Ramjee Prasad	1,746	1.03	
Janata Congress	Malkhan Singh	1,613	0.95	
NOTA	None of the above	2,022	1.19	▼2.28
Majority		2,302	1.35	▼0.42
Turnout		170,077	61.96	▼4.01
CPI(ML)L gain from JD(U)		Swing		

=== 2015 ===
2015 Bihar Legislative Assembly election: Sikta
Party	Candidate	Votes	%	±%
JD(U)	Firoj Ahmad	69,870	43.48	
BJP	Dilip Varma	67,035	41.71	
CPI(ML)L	Birendra Prasad Gupta	5,639	3.51	
Independent	Dhanesh Patel	4,043	2.52	
Independent	Ajeet Kumar Urf Munna Singh	2,551	1.59	
NOTA	None of the above	5,579	3.47	
Majority		2,835	1.77	
Turnout		160,709	65.97	
JD(U) gain from Independent		Swing		

=== 2010 ===
2010 Bihar Legislative Assembly election: Sikta
Party	Candidate	Votes	%	±%
Independent	Dilip Varma	49,229	39.40	
JD(U)	Firoj Ahmad	40,450	32.37	
LJP	Ghanshyam Prasad	8,779	7.03	
CPI(ML)L	Birendra Prasad Gupta	5,921	4.74	
Independent	Krishna Prasad	5,010	4.01	
INC	Faiyazul Azam	3,187	2.55	
Majority		8,779	7.03	
Turnout		1,24,948	62.63	
Independent gain from INC		Swing		
