= Faiyazul Azam =

Indian politician (born 1936-2014)

Member of Bihar Legislative Assembly
- In office 1972–1980
- Constituency: Sikta
- In office 1990–1991
- Constituency: Sikta

Member of Lok Sabha from Bettiah
- In office 1991–1996

Personal details
- Born: West Champaran district, Bihar, India
- Other political affiliations: Janata Dal; Indian National Congress; Bahujan Samaj Party
- Spouse: Roshan Qeyas (m. 1953)
- Children: 3 sons and 5 daughters
- Parent: Late Shri Rauful Azam (father)

Faiyazul Azam (born 30 December 1936) is an Indian politician and former member of the Bihar Legislative Assembly representing Sikta for three terms as an Independent, Indian National Congress (O) candidate and Indian National Congress candidate. He was elected to the 10th Lok Sabha from Bettiah as a Janata Dal candidate.
