= Renu Devi =

Indian politician

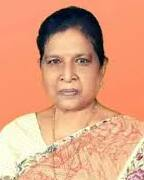

7th Deputy Chief Minister of Bihar
- In office 16 November 2020 – 9 August 2022 Serving with Tarkishore Prasad
- Chief Minister: Nitish Kumar
- Preceded by: Sushil Kumar Modi
- Succeeded by: Tejashwi Yadav

Minister of Backward Classes & Extremely Backward Classes Welfare Government of Bihar
- In office 16 November 2020 – 9 August 2022
- Chief Minister: Nitish Kumar
- Preceded by: Binod Kumar Singh

Minister of Disaster Management Government of Bihar
- In office 9 February 2021 – 9 August 2022
- Chief Minister: Nitish Kumar
- Preceded by: Tarkishore Prasad

Minister of Industry Government of Bihar
- In office 16 November 2020 – 9 February 2021
- Chief Minister: Nitish Kumar
- Preceded by: Shyam Rajak
- Succeeded by: Shahnawaz Hussain

Minister of Panchayat Raj Government of Bihar
- In office 16 November 2020 – 9 February 2021
- Chief Minister: Nitish Kumar
- Preceded by: Kapil Deo Kamat
- Succeeded by: Samrat Chaudhary

Minister of Art, Culture & Youth Affairs Government of Bihar
- In office 13 April 2008 – 26 November 2010
- Chief Minister: Nitish Kumar
- Preceded by: Janardan Singh Sigriwal
- Succeeded by: Sukhada Pandey

Member of Bihar Legislative Assembly
- Incumbent
- Assumed office 2020
- Preceded by: Madan Mohan Tiwari
- Constituency: Bettiah
- In office 2000–2015
- Preceded by: Birval Yadava
- Succeeded by: Madan Mohan Tiwari
- Constituency: Bettiah

Minister of Animal and Fisheries Resources Government of Bihar
- In office 18 March 2024 – 20 November 2025
- Chief Minister: Nitish Kumar
- Succeeded by: Surendra Mehta

Personal details
- Born: 1 November 1959 (age 66) Bettiah, Bihar, India
- Party: Bharatiya Janata Party
- Spouse: Durga Prasad (died)
- Children: 2
- Education: B. R. Ambedkar Bihar University

Renu Devi (born 1 November 1959) is an Indian politician who served as the 7th Deputy Chief Minister of Bihar from 16 November 2020 to 9 August 2022. She also served as Animal and Fisheries Resources minister in 9th Nitish cabinet.

She became the fifth female Deputy Chief Minister of India from Bihar in 2020. A former national vice-president of the Bharatiya Janata Party, she is currently a Member of the Bihar Legislative Assembly and the formerly deputy legislative leader of party for the National Democratic Alliance.

== Personal life ==
Renu, eldest of her parents' three sons and five daughters, comes from the Noniya caste, an extremely backward Class (EBC) community. She completed secondary school education in 1977 from the Babasaheb Bhimrao Ambedkar Bihar University.

She was married to a Kolkata-based insurance inspector named Durga Prasad in 1973. However, the sudden death of her husband within seven years of marriage made her return to Bettiah, her mother's hometown, and pursue it as her karmabhoomi. She is a single parent with two children.

== Political career ==
Renu Devi's mother was associated with the Sangh Parivar, which is said to have strongly influenced her. Renu Devi was also part of Durga Vahini, the women's wing of the Vishwa Hindu Parishad.

Beginning her political career through social activism in 1981, she later joined the BJP Mahila Morcha or BJP women's wing in 1988. Next year, she was given the responsibility to head the wing in the Champaran region. She was further chosen as the wing's state head for two terms, in 1993 and 1996.

Though she unsuccessfully contested her first election in 1995 from the Nautan Assembly seat, she was successful in being elected four times from Bettiah (2000–2015; 2020–present), another division of West Champaran district, to the Bihar Legislative Assembly. She lost 2015 elections to a Mahagathbandhan candidate from whom she recovered the seat again in 2020.

She served as the Minister of Sports, Arts and Culture in the Bihar State Government between 2005 and 2009. She was also a national vice-president of the BJP between 2014 and 2020, and was nominated as a member of the National Working Committee of the party by Amit Shah. Her appointment in 2020 as a Deputy Chief Minister of Bihar has been positively received.
