= Pramod Kumar Sinha =

Indian politician

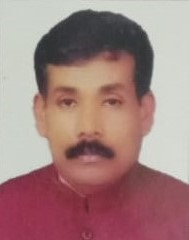

Member of the Bihar Legislative Assembly
- Incumbent
- Assumed office 10 November 2020
- Preceded by: Ajay Kumar Singh
- Constituency: Raxaul

Personal details
- Born: 2 April 1960 (age 66)
- Party: BJP
- Occupation: Politician

Pramod Kumar Sinha (also known as Pramod Kumar Sinha Kushwaha) is an Indian politician from Bihar and a Member of the Bihar Legislative Assembly. Sinha won the Raxaul Constituency on the symbol of BJP in the 2020 Bihar Legislative Assembly election.

== Political career ==
Sinha was a member of Janata Dal (United) and prior to Bihar Assembly elections of 2020, he joined Bhartiya Janata Party. Sinha was serving as District level president of Janata Dal United before joining Bhartiya Janata Party. After assuming the membership of the BJP, he was made a candidate for 2020 assembly elections from Raxaul Assembly constituency, keeping aside sitting Member of Legislative Assembly, Ajay Singh. In response to candidature of Sinha, protests were organised by the supporters of Ajay Singh; the supporters of Singh contested the decision of BJP leadership on the question of rejecting his candidature in favour of Sinha.

It was during tenure of Sinha in 2022 that a food laboratory was established in Raxaul. A sub-divisional hospital was also inaugurated by union minister Mansukh Mandaviya. This laboratory was aimed at increasing the import and export of food products as the quality testing of those products could take place locally promoting swift movement of the cargo.
