= Mujauna, Samastipur =

Mujauna a village, 8 km west of Samastipur, Bihar, India. The village has a large population of Brahmins, as well as Paswan and Dhanuk.

The nearest railway station is Karpurigram.this village is very high population
