= Narkatiaganj–Bhikhna Thori branch line =

Railway line in India

Narkatiaganj–Bhikhna Thori line

Overview
- Status: Operational
- Owner: Indian Railways
- Locale: Bihar
- Termini: Narkatiaganj Junction; Bhikhna Thori

Service
- Operator: East Central Railway

Technical
- Line length: 36 km
- Track gauge: 1,676 mm (5 ft 6 in) broad gauge
- Electrification: Yes

The Narkatiaganj–Bhikhna Thori line is a railway line in eastern India, operated by Indian Railways, that connects Narkatiaganj and Bhikhna Thori near the Indo-Nepal border.

== History ==
Railway lines in the area were pioneered by Tirhut Railway and the Bengal and North Western Railway lines in the 19th century. In his book The Indian Empire, Its People, History and Products W.W.Hunter says, "The Tirhut State Railway with its various branches intersects Northern Behar and is intended to extend to the Nepal frontier on one side and to Assam on the other."

The area was laid with metre-gauge tracks. The 229 km (142 mi) Samastipur–Narkatiaganj loop was developed in stages between 1875 and 1907. The Samastipur–Darbhanga line opened for famine relief in 1874 and opened to the public on 1 November 1875. The 72 km (45 mi)-long Nirmali branch (Darbhanga–Nirmali) opened between 1883 and 1886. The Sakri–Jainagar branch opened in 1905. The Jhanjharpur–Laukaha Bazar line opened in 1976.

== Gauge conversion ==
Presently services are suspended on this 36 km line since 2015, as it is undergoing gauge conversion, from 1,000 mm (3 ft 3 3/8 in) metre gauge to 1,676 mm (5 ft 6 in) broad gauge. It is expected that the first stretch between Narkatiaganj Junction and Amolwa (13 km) to be completed in March 2020 and by June 2020, up to Gawnaha (23 km). The final section between Gawnaha and Bhikhna Thori (13 km) passes through dense forest and needs a special permit from the Forest Department allowing construction works. As of August 2019, the permit has not been given. According to the forest department, Gawnaha–Bhikhna Thori section should be closed and the railway land transferred to them.
