= Raghunath Jha =

Indian politician (1939–2018)

Member of Parliament (MP) in Lok Sabha
- In office 2004–2009
- Preceded by: Madan Prasad Jaiswal
- Succeeded by: constituency abolished
- Constituency: Bettiah
- In office 1999–2004
- Preceded by: Abdul Ghafoor
- Succeeded by: Sadhu Yadav
- Constituency: Gopalganj

Personal details
- Born: 9 August 1939; Sitamarhi, Bihar, British India
- Died: 15 January 2018 (aged 78); Delhi, India
- Political party: Rashtriya Janata DalSamata Party led by Uday Mandal

Raghunath Jha (9 August 1939 – 15 January 2018) was an Indian politician who was Union minister of State for Heavy Industries and Public Enterprise and member of the 14th Lok Sabha of India. He represented the Bettiah constituency of Bihar and was a member of the Rashtriya Janata Dal (RJD) political party. Born in Amba Ojha Tola village, in Sheohar (then Sitamarhi in British India), he started his career by becoming the Mukhiya of his home panchayat and Chairman of Zila Parishad in 1967. He started his legislative career in 1972 when he was elected as an MLA on Congress Ticket. He was elected from Sheohar for a record six consecutive terms before 1998. He was twice elected as a Member of Parliament from Gopalganj and Bettiah respectively.

== Political career ==
Jha remained a member of Socialist Party before switching to the Congress in 1972 and successfully contesting the assembly elections from Sheohar.

He represented the constituency in 1972, 1977 and 1980 on the Congress ticket and became a minister in the Jagannath Mishra ministry in Bihar. As he paraded in favour of Mishra before the Raj Bhavan in 1985 in support of the latter's candidature for the post of chief minister and ouster of the then chief minister Bhagwat Jha Azad, Jha was denied re-nomination from Sheohar for "disobeying" the Congress leadership. Jha then resigned from the Congress' primary membership and secured a Janata Party ticket when Shekhar was its president. Rajiv Gandhi came to campaign against Jha in Sheohar but the latter won the elections to the Sheohar assembly seat for the fourth time.

After the merger of former prime minister V P Singh's Jan Morcha, Janata Party and Lok Dal of former deputy prime minister Devi Lal in Bangalore in 1988, Jha became the state president of Janata Dal in Bihar. But his relations with Singh were not going well and he was removed from the post within three months. A few months after his removal, Jha was made chairman of the party's parliamentary board in Bihar following Shekhar's intervention.

In the late 1980s, some of the remnants of Janata Party had come together to form Janata Dal, which formed a coalition government at the national level following the 1989 Indian general election. In 1990 Bihar Legislative Assembly election, Janata Dal won the largest number of seats and sought to form government with the outside support of BJP and Communists. Jha was a contender for Chief Ministership pitted against Ram Sundar Das and Lalu Prasad Yadav. Yadav was supported by Devi Lal and Nitish Kumar, Jha by Chandra Shekhar and Das by Prime Minister VP Singh. Yadav had campaigned heavily in favour of implementing Mandal Commission, which sought to reserve government jobs for backward castes in Central Government jobs. Das was less keen on this. Nitish Kumar rallied backward caste MLAs towards Yadav. In the election, Yadav won narrowly over Das by a vote of 59 to 56. Jha won 12, mostly upper caste MLAs.

On 3 September 2015, Jha left the RJD joined the Samajwadi Party, becoming the latter's first MLA in Bihar. He also accused Prasad of ignoring senior leaders in a bid to promote his family members in the party.

He died on 15 January 2018 at Ram Manohar Lohia Hospital in Delhi.

Lok Sabha
Preceded by Madan Prasad Jaiswal	Member of Parliament for Bettiah; 2004–2009	Succeeded by Constituency ceased to exist
