= Bettiah Assembly constituency =

Coordinates: 26°48′N 84°30′E

Bettiah
- Constituency No. 8 for the Bihar Legislative Assembly

Constituency details
- Country: India
- Region: East India
- State: Bihar
- Division: Tirhut
- District: Paschim Champaran
- Lok Sabha constituency: 2. Paschim Champaran
- Established: 1951
- Total electors: 292,087
- Reservation: None

Member of Legislative Assembly
- 18th Bihar Legislative Assembly
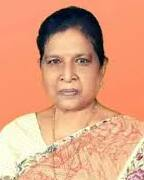
- Incumbent Renu Devi
- Party: BJP
- Alliance: National Democratic Alliance
- Elected year: 2025
- Preceded by: Madan Mohan Tiwari, INC

Bettiah Assembly constituency is an assembly constituency in Paschim Champaran district in the Indian state of Bihar. In 2015 Bihar Legislative Assembly election, Bettiah was one of the 36 seats to have VVPAT enabled electronic voting machines.

== Overview ==
As per orders of Delimitation of Parliamentary and Assembly constituencies Order, 2008, 8. Bettiah Assembly constituency is composed of the following: Bettiah community development block; and Mohaddipur, Majhaulia, Parsa, Bahuarawa, Gudara, Jaukatia, Bakharia, Rulahi, Rajabhar, Karamawa, Lal Saraiya, Ramnagar Bankat, Amawa Majhar, Majharia Sheikh, Ahawar Kuria, Madhopur, Senuwaria and Bishambharpur gram panchayats of Majhaulia CD Block.

Bettiah Assembly constituency is part of 2. Paschim Champaran (Lok Sabha constituency). It was earlier part of Bettiah (Lok Sabha constituency).

== Members of the Legislative Assembly ==
| Year | Name | Party |
|---|---|---|
| 1952 | Prajapati Mishra | Indian National Congress |
| 1952^ | Ketaki Devi | Indian National Congress |
| 1957 | Jay Narayan Prasad | Indian National Congress |
| 1957 | Jagannath Pd. Swatantra | Indian National Congress |
| 1962 | Jay Narayan Prasad | Indian National Congress |
| 1967 | H.P. Shahi | Independent |
| 1969 | Gauri Shankar Pandey | Indian National Congress |
| 1972 | Krishna Mohan Pandey | Indian National Congress |
| 1977 | Gauri Shankar Pandey | Indian National Congress |
| 1980 | Gauri Shankar Pandey | Indian National Congress (I) |
| 1985 | Gauri Shankar Pandey | Indian National Congress |
| 1990 | Madan Prasad Jaiswal | Bharatiya Janata Party |
| 1995 | Birval Yadava | Janata Dal |
| 2000 | Renu Devi | Bharatiya Janata Party |
| 2005 | Renu Devi | Bharatiya Janata Party |
| 2005 | Renu Devi | Bharatiya Janata Party |
| 2010 | Renu Devi | Bharatiya Janata Party |
| 2015 | Madan Mohan Tiwari | Indian National Congress |
| 2020 | Renu Devi | Bharatiya Janata Party |
| 2025 | Renu Devi | Bharatiya Janata Party |

== Election results ==
=== 2025 ===
2025 Bihar Legislative Assembly election: Bettiah
| Party | Candidate | Votes | % | ±% |
|---|---|---|---|---|
| BJP | Renu Devi | 91,907 | 46.78 | −6.05 |
| INC | Wasi Ahmad | 69,534 | 35.39 | −6.14 |
| Independent | Rohit Kumar Sikaria | 24,665 | 12.55 | |
| JSP | Anil Kumar Singh | 6,297 | 3.21 | |
| NOTA | None of the above | 1,981 | 1.01 | −0.25 |
| Majority | | 22,373 | 11.39 | +0.09 |
| Turnout | | 196,464 | 67.26 | +11.0 |
| BJP hold | | Swing | | |

=== 2020 ===
Bihar Assembly election, 2020: Bettiah
| Party | Candidate | Votes | % | ±% |
|---|---|---|---|---|
| BJP | Renu Devi | 84,496 | 52.83 | ▲9.14 |
| INC | Madan Mohan Tiwari | 66,417 | 41.53 | ▼3.73 |
| PP | Avkash Kumar Gupta | 1,559 | 0.97 | |
| NOTA | None of the above | 2,017 | 1.26 | ▼0.04 |
| Majority | | 18,079 | 11.3 | ▲9.73 |
| Turnout | | 159,932 | 56.26 | ▼2.98 |
| BJP gain from INC | | Swing | | |

=== 2015 ===
2015 Bihar Legislative Assembly election: Bettiah
| Party | Candidate | Votes | % | ±% |
|---|---|---|---|---|
| INC | Madan Mohan Tiwari | 66,786 | 45.26 | |
| BJP | Renu Devi | 64,466 | 43.69 | |
| Independent | Sameer Hasan | 2,851 | 1.93 | |
| CPI(M) | Mohammad Saidullah | 1,628 | 1.1 | |
| BSP | Lakshmi Ram | 1,553 | 1.05 | |
| Independent | Punydeo Prasad | 1,355 | 0.92 | |
| SS | Ramesh Chandra Sinha | 1,348 | 0.91 | |
| NOTA | None of the above | 1,918 | 1.3 | |
| Majority | | 2,320 | 1.57 | |
| Turnout | | 147,563 | 59.24 | |
| INC gain from BJP | | Swing | | |

=== 2010 ===
2010 Bihar Legislative Assembly election: Bettiah
| Party | Candidate | Votes | % | ±% |
|---|---|---|---|---|
| BJP | Renu Devi | 42,010 | 39.57 | |
| Independent | Anil Kumar Jha | 13,221 | 12.45 | |
| INC | Madan Mohan Tiwari | 12,499 | 11.77 | |
| LJP | Virval Yadav | 11,511 | 10.84 | |
| Majority | | 28,789 | 27.12 | |
| Turnout | | 1,06,163 | 55.25 | |
| BJP hold | | Swing | | |
