= Dilip Varma =

Indian politician

Member of Bihar Legislative Assembly
- In office 1991 – Feb 2005
- Constituency: Sikta
- In office 2010–2015
- Constituency: Sikta

Personal details
- Born: Dilip Kumar Varma
- Other political affiliations: Bharatiya Janata Party; Indian National Congress; Samajwadi Party; Champaran Vikas Party
- Parent: Amresh Prasad Varma (father)
- Education: Degree from St. Xavier's College, Mumbai University (graduated 1974)
- Alma mater: Mumbai University

Dilip Varma is an Indian politician from Bihar. He represented Sikta in Bihar Legislative Assembly for 5 terms as an Independent, Bharatiya Janata Party (BJP) candidate, Samajwadi Party candidate, Congress candidate and Camparan Vikas Party candidate.

== Political career ==
Varma fought in 1991 by-polls of Sikta, Bihar as an Independent candidate and won. He won again in 1995 Bihar Legislative Assembly election, and the 2000 and February 2005 elections, being elected continuously in successive elections. His party allegiance varied over his time as a member of the Vidhan Sabha, and Varma won reelection standing as a candidate for different parties. He lost the October 2005 election and won 2010 Bihar Legislative Assembly election as an independent candidate.
