= Sammridh Varma =

Indian politician

Member of Bihar Legislative Assembly
- Incumbent
- Assumed office 2025
- Preceded by: Birendra Prasad Gupta
- Constituency: Sikta

Personal details
- Party: Janata Dal (United)

Sammridh Varma is an Indian politician from Janata Dal (United) and a member of Bihar Legislative Assembly from Sikta Assembly constituency seat.
