= Nautan Assembly constituency =

Coordinates: 26°43′N 84°28′E

Nautan
- Constituency No. 6 for the Bihar Legislative Assembly

Constituency details
- Country: India
- Region: East India
- State: Bihar
- District: Paschim Champaran
- Lok Sabha constituency: 2. Paschim Champaran
- Established: 1967
- Total electors: 286,639
- Reservation: None

Member of Legislative Assembly
- 18th Bihar Legislative Assembly
- Incumbent Narayan Prasad
- Party: BJP
- Alliance: NDA
- Elected year: 2025

Nautan Assembly constituency is an assembly constituency in Paschim Champaran district in the Indian state of Bihar.

== Overview ==
As per orders of Delimitation of Parliamentary and Assembly constituencies Order, 2008, 6. Nautan Assembly constituency is composed of the following: Bairiya and Nautan community development blocks.

Nautan Assembly constituency is part of 2. Paschim Champaran. It was earlier part of Bettiah.

== Members of the Legislative Assembly ==
Year	Name	Party
1967	Kedar Pandey	Indian National Congress
1969	Kedar Pandey	Indian National Congress
1972	Kedar Pandey	Indian National Congress
1977	Kedar Pandey	Indian National Congress
1980	Kamla Pandey	Indian National Congress (I)
1985	Kamla Pandey	Indian National Congress
1990	Rawakant Diwedi	Communist Party of India
1995	Satan Yadav	Independent
2000	Baidyanath Prasad Mahto	Samata Party
2005	Baidyanath Prasad Mahto	Janata Dal (United)
2005	Baidyanath Prasad Mahto	Janata Dal (United)
2009^	Narayan Prasad	Bahujan Samaj Party
2010	Manorma Prasad	Janata Dal (United)
2015	Narayan Prasad	Bharatiya Janata Party
2020	Narayan Prasad	Bharatiya Janata Party
2025	Narayan Prasad	Bharatiya Janata Party

== Election results ==
=== 2025 ===
2025 Bihar Legislative Assembly election: Nautan
Party	Candidate	Votes	%	±%
BJP	Narayan Prasad	101,952	49.05	+2.08
INC	Amit Kumar (Giri)	79,880	38.43	+6.92
JSP	Santosh Chaudhari	12,082	5.81	
BSP	Virendra Rao	2,714	1.31	
Independent	Bipin Bihari Pandey	1,990	0.96	
Independent	Sikandar Ram	1,943	0.93	
NOTA	None of the above	3,220	1.55	+0.47
Majority		22,072	10.62	−4.84
Turnout		207,833	72.51	+12.22
BJP hold		Swing		

=== 2020 ===
2020 Bihar Legislative Assembly election: Nautan
Party	Candidate	Votes	%	±%
BJP	Narayan Prasad	78,657	46.97	▲2.62
INC	Sheikh Kamran	52,761	31.51	
Independent	Manorama Prasad	15,421	9.21	
RLSP	Nandkishor Prasad	4,587	2.74	
Independent	Vikash Kumar Prasad	3,967	2.37	
Independent	Shubham Kumar Dubey	1,824	1.09	
NOTA	None of the above	1,813	1.08	▼0.54
Majority		25,896	15.46	▲5.93
Turnout		167,451	60.29	▼1.49
BJP hold		Swing		

=== 2015 ===
2015 Bihar Legislative Assembly election: Nautan
Party	Candidate	Votes	%	±%
BJP	Narayan Prasad	66,697	44.35	
JD(U)	Baidyanath Prasad Mahto	52,362	34.82	
Independent	Raj Kumar Prasad	4,287	2.85	
CPI	Gallu Chaudhari	4,242	2.82	
Independent	Santosh Chaudhary	3,995	2.66	
BSP	Shailesh Kushawaha	3,873	2.58	
Independent	Punyadev Prasad	2,949	1.96	
SS	Nawal Kishor Pathak	2,231	1.48	
Independent	Ratan Kumar Sarkar	1,452	0.97	
SP	Sanjay Kumar Kushwaha	1,384	0.92	
NOTA	None of the above	2,438	1.62	
Majority		14,335	9.53	
Turnout		150,379	61.78	
BJP gain from JD(U)		Swing		

=== 2010 ===
2010 Bihar Legislative Assembly election: Nautan
Party	Candidate	Votes	%	±%
JD(U)	Manorma Prasad	40,894	36.48	
LJP	Narayan Prasad	18,130	16.17	
CPI	Gallu Chaudhari	15,764	14.06	
BSP	Amar Yadav	8,521	7.60	
INC	Rameshwar Prasad	6,484	5.78	
Independent	Kamran Sheikh	4,288	3.82	
Majority		22,764	20.31	
Turnout		1,12,107	55.96	
JD(U) gain from BSP		Swing		
