= Belwania, Uttar Pradesh =

Coordinates: 27.11904°N 83.93537°E

Belwania
- Village
- Interactive map of Belwania
- Country: India
- State: Uttar Pradesh
- District: Kushinagar

Belwania is a small village situated between Padrauna (25 km north) and Chhitauni (3 km south) on the National Highway 28B in the Kushinagar District of Uttar Pradesh State in India. It is under the Gram Panchayat of Dargauli.The village is situated almost on the border of Uttar Pradesh and Bihar.

== History ==
Its history starts at the early independence time of India in the 1950s. Some Gupta (Sahu) family moved into the area around 1950 as this region was least developed and there were enough field for farming. They bought farming lands there and settled down. Later, this village attracted other people namely some Chauhan family and Kushwaha family to the village. The majority of population in the village is divided among Guptas, Kushwahas and Chauhan and Mushahar. There is also some family of Muslims and Vishkarmas (Lohar). The village was undeveloped and poor until 1985, when Catholic Canadian priest John Mariya Vianney O F M CAP visited the area. After seeing poor living condition of the people and no medical facilities, he decided to set up a school and an hospital there which is called Gyanoday Vidhyalay and Euphrasia Hospital respectively. Gyanoday Vidhyalay, which later became an Inter College, is an institution for children and specially girls of this region. It is operated by the Catholic Diocese of Gorakhpur, which is a part of Syro-Malabar Catholic Diocese. gyanoday inter college.

== People ==
The main business of the villagers of Belwania is farming. Sugarcane and banana plantations are the main business of the villages. Instead of these two products rice, wheat, pulse, maize, mustard, grains are also being produced by the farmers. Due to bad condition of sugar factory in Chhitauni, the farmers have shifted from producing sugar cane to banana as it is more profitable. Some 25% of the population of village are illiterate people, mostly belongs to Musahar who works as labourer. Gyanoday Vidyalay is an institution which is situated in the village. There are many shops that have been established and it is growing as a new market area for the local people as people come to buy vegetables in its small market which growing day by day.
