= Gauri Shankar Pandey =

Indian politician

Gauri Shankar Pandey (Malikaar)
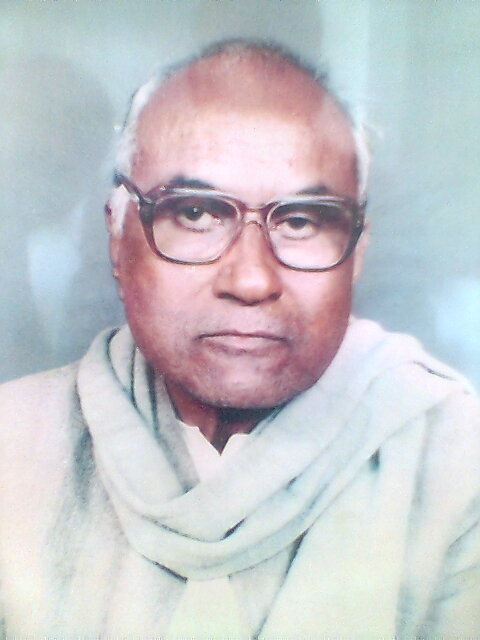
- Former Minister of Transport, Excise, Environment, Forest Bihar

Bettiah (Vidhan Sabha constituency)
- In office 1969, 1977, 1982, 1985

Personal details
- Born: 9 August 1935 (age 91) Bettiah, Bihar
- Children: 5 sons and 3 daughters

Shri Gauri Shanker Pandey (गौरी शंकर पाण्डेय), was a veteran Indian politician and a former Minister of Bihar. He represented Bettiah constituency in Bihar assembly and served in various ministerial portfolios.

He was a popular leader of Congress from Bihar and even leaders from opposition party respected him for his social services, simplicity and honesty. After retiring from active politics, he remained in his home village Baithania (near Bettiah) for the rest of his life serving the people.

== Member of Legislative Assembly, Bihar ==
He was a member of Bihar Legislative Assembly during 1969–72, 1977–82, 1982–85, and 1985-90 Bettiah (Vidhan Sabha constituency), Bihar. He held several ministerial portfolios including Road, Transport, Civil Aviation, Law, Excise, Environment, and forest in successive Bihar Governments.

== See also ==
- List of politicians from Bihar
