= Khurshid Urf Firoj Ahmad =

Indian politician

Minister of Minority Welfare. Government of Bihar
- In office 27 July 2017 – 13 November 2020

Minister of Sugar Cane Industry. Government of Bihar
- In office November 2015 – July 2017

MLA of Sikta
- In office 2015–2020
- In office 2005–2010

Personal details
- Party: Janata Dal (United)
- Other political affiliations: Indian National Congress

Khurshid Urf Firoj Ahmad is an Indian politician in the Janata Dal (United) party, previously serving as the Minister for Minority Welfare and Sugar Cane Industries in the Government of Bihar under Nitish Kumar. He was elected a member of the Bihar Legislative Assembly from Sikta in Nov. 2005 and 2015. In the 2020 assembly election Mr. Khurshid lost the election and held the third position.
