= Narayan Prasad =

Indian politician

Minister of Disaster Management Government of Bihar
- In office 20 November 2025 – 15 April 2026
- Chief Minister: Nitish Kumar
- Preceded by: Vijay Kumar Mandal
- Succeeded by: Samrat Choudhary

Minister of Tourism Government of Bihar
- In office 9 February 2021 – 9 August 2022
- Chief Minister: Nitish Kumar
- Preceded by: Jibesh Kumar
- Succeeded by: Tejashwi Yadav

Member of Bihar Legislative Assembly
- Incumbent
- Assumed office November 2015
- Preceded by: Manorma Prasad
- Constituency: Nautan
- In office 2009–2010
- Preceded by: Baidyanath Prasad Mahto
- Succeeded by: Manorma Prasad
- Constituency: Nautan

Personal details
- Born: 15 February 1958 (age 68) Bihar, India
- Party: Bharatiya Janata Party
- Occupation: Politician

Narayan Prasad Sah (born 15 February 1958) is a member of the Bharatiya Janata Party from Bihar. He is the current disaster management minister of Bihar. He was tourism minister of Bihar. He has won the Bihar Legislative Assembly election in 2015 from Nautan.

Narayan Prasad entered politics in the year 1985 and has served as bloc and district level functionary of Bharatiya Janata Party in the West Champaran region. He is known as Narayan Prasad Sah in political circle, which represents his affiliation with the Teli (Sahu) caste of Bihar. Prasad won the Zila Parishad election in 2001 and in 2015, he was elected to Bihar Legislative Assembly. In 2020 he was re-elected to Bihar Legislative Assembly and in the cabinet expansion of 2021, made a minister in Government of Bihar under Nitish Kumar. In 2025 he was re-elected to Bihar Legislative Assembly
