= West Champaran district =

District in Bihar, India

- District
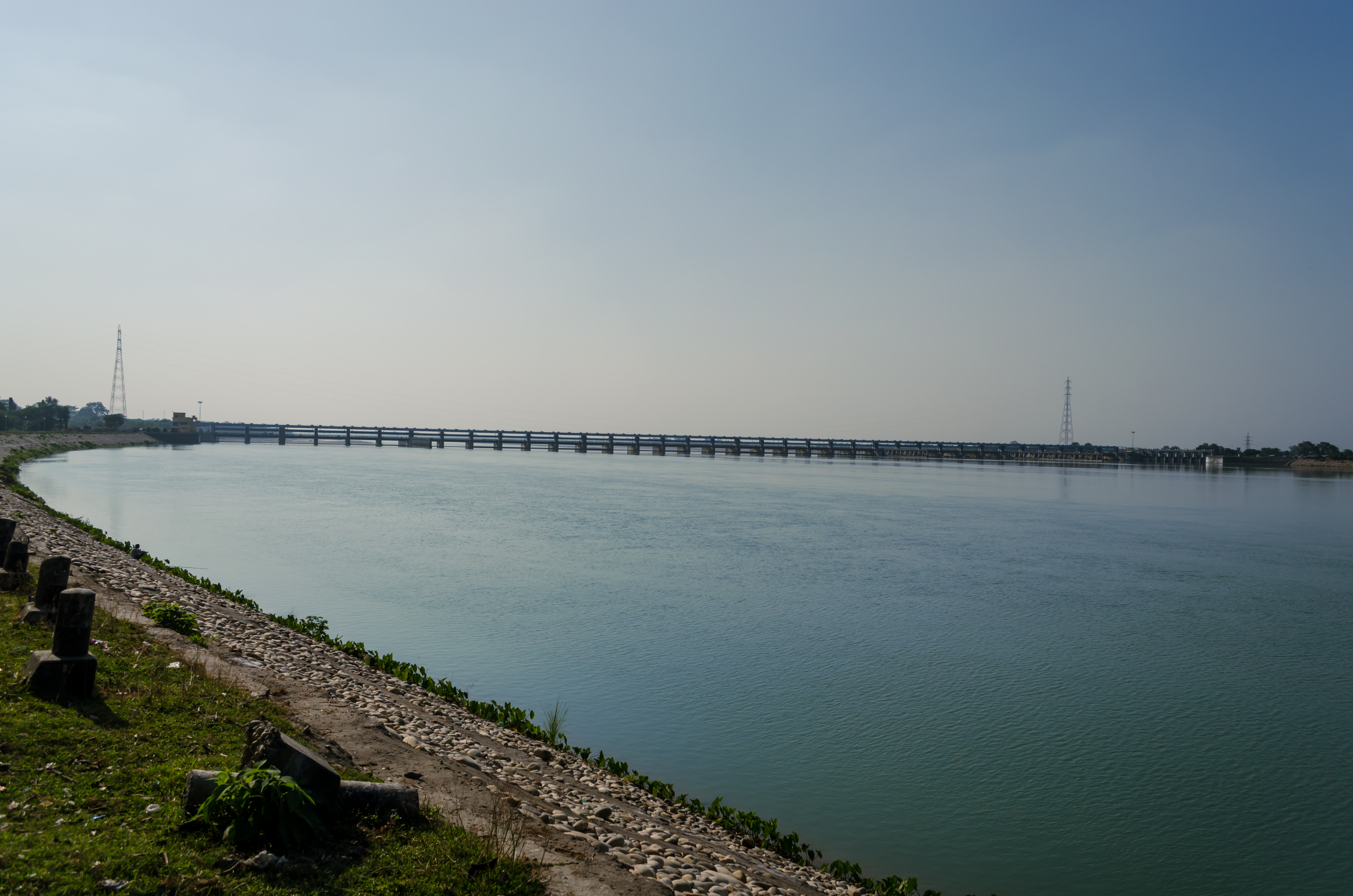
- Gandaki River near Valmikinagar

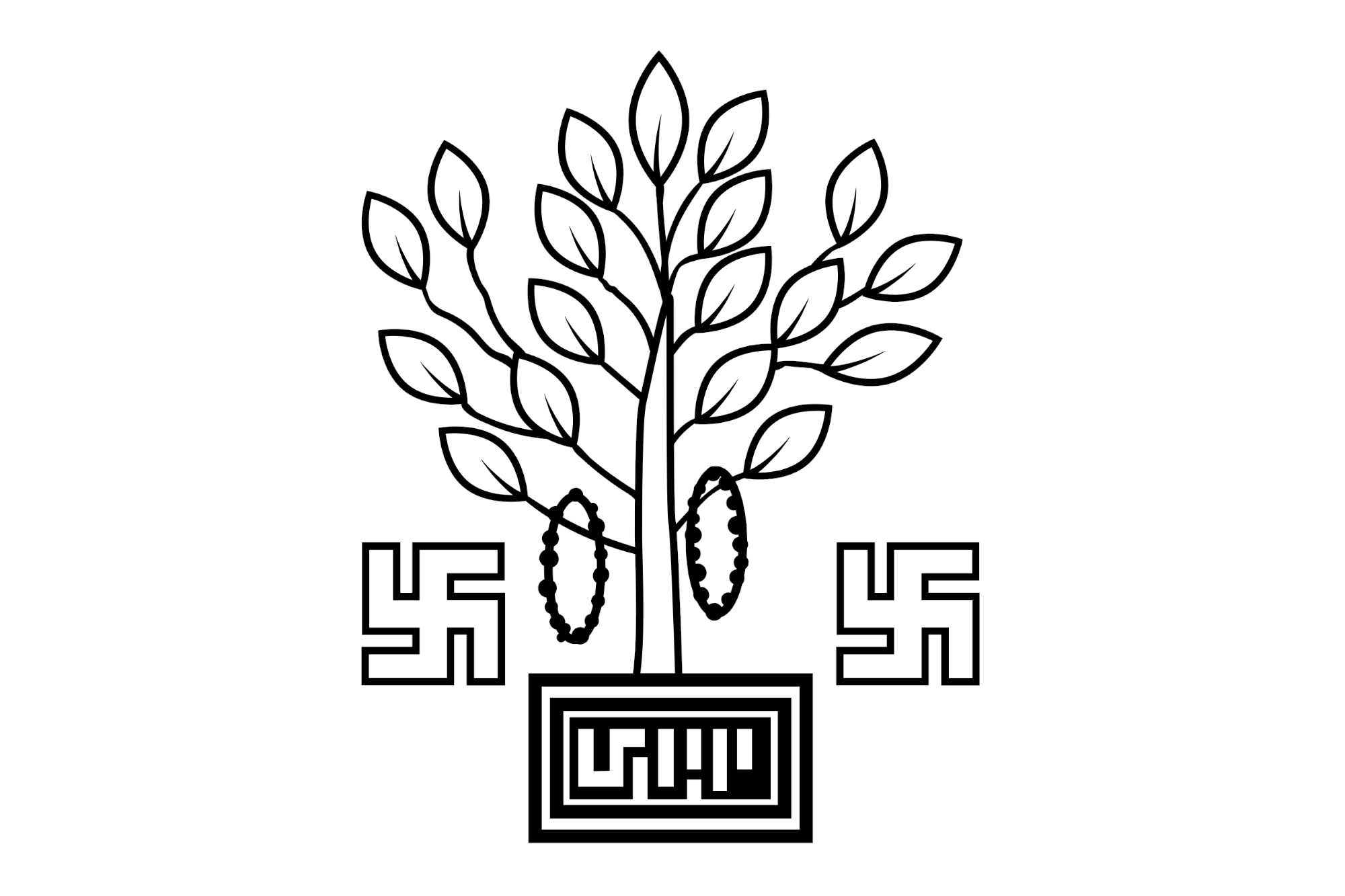
- Seal

- Location of West Champaran district in Bihar
- Coordinates (Bettiah): 26°48′N 84°30′E
- Country: India
- State: Bihar
- Division: Tirhut
- Headquarters: Bettiah
- Tehsils: 18

Government
  - District Magistrate (DM): Dharmendra Kumar
  - Superintendent of Police (SP): Shaurya Suman
  - Lok Sabha constituencies: Paschim Champaran, Valmiki Nagar
  - Vidhan Sabha constituencies: Valmiki Nagar, Ramnagar, Narkatiaganj, Bagaha, Lauriya, Nautan, Chanpatia, Bettiah, Sikta

Area
  - Total: 5,228 km^{2} (2,019 sq mi)
  - Rank: 1 (in bihar)

Population (2011)
  - Total: 3,935,042
  - Density: 752.7/km^{2} (1,949/sq mi)

Demographics
  - Literacy: 58.06 per cent (2011)
  - Sex ratio: 906
- Time zone: UTC+05:30 (IST)
- PIN Code: 8454XX
- Major highways: NH 28B
- Website: http://westchamparan.bih.nic.in/

West Champaran district is an administrative district in the state of Bihar in India, located just 60 km (37 mi) west of Birgunj. It is the largest district in Bihar with an area of 5,228 km^{2}(2,019sq mi). It is a part of Tirhut Division. The district headquarters are located in Bettiah. The district is known for its open border with Nepal. One of the major location in West Champaran is Kumar Bagh for SAIL Special Processing Unit and Bhitiharwa where Mahatma Gandhi started Satyagrah Aandolan.

The district produces the most sugarcane across the state of Bihar in 2022.

== History ==
Mahatma Gandhi started the Champaran Satyagraha movement from here in 1917 along with nationalists Rajendra Prasad, Anugrah Narayan Sinha and Brajkishore Prasad. During the British period, the Champaran region was part of a single undivided district known as Champaran, which was later divided into East Champaran and West Champaran. The Champaran region gained national importance during the Champaran Satyagraha of 1917, led by Mahatma Gandhi. According to official historical records of the Government of India, the movement began when Gandhi visited the region to investigate the condition of indigo farmers under British plantation policies and mobilised public support against the exploitative system. The Champaran region is geographically and historically connected, with present-day East Champaran serving as an entry point from the eastern side, while West Champaran contains important ecological and historical sites including the Valmiki Tiger Reserve near Valmikinagar. Mehsi is locally regarded as an entry point into the Champaran region from the eastern side, due to its geographical position connecting Muzaffarpur and East Champaran areas, and is often referred to in local tradition as the "Gateway of Champaran".

== Geography ==
The district occupies an area of 5,228 square kilometres (2,019 sq mi), comparatively equivalent to Canada's Amund Ringnes Island.

=== Flora and fauna ===
In 1989 West Champaran district became home to Valmiki National Park, which has an area of 336 km^{2} (129.7 mi^{2}). It is also home to two wildlife sanctuaries: Valmiki (adjacent to its namesake national park) and Udaypur Wildlife Sanctuary. Fauna include the Bengal tiger.

== Literary history of Champaran ==
Freedom Fighter and author Ramesh Chandra Jha was the first person who penned down the rich literary history of Champaran. His research based books including Champaran Ki Sahitya Sadhana (चम्पारन की साहित्य साधना) (1958), Champaran:Literature & Literary Writers (चम्पारन: साहित्य और साहित्यकार) (1967) and Apne Aur Sapne:A Literary Journey Of Champaran (अपने और सपने: चम्पारन की साहित्य यात्रा) (1988) meticulously document the rich literary heritage and history of Champaran, Bihar. These seminal books further serve as foundational reference points for researchers, scholars, Ph.D. students, and journalists alike. Jha's exploration and preservation of Champaran's historical and literary legacy have solidified his place as a cornerstone in the field of literary research.

== Administrative divisions ==
The West Champaran district is divided into 3 Tehsil (sub-division):

1. Bettiah
2. Bagaha
3. Narkatiaganj

=== Blocks ===
The West Champaran district is divided into 18 Blocks:

- Bettiah
- Sikta
- Mainatanr
- Chanpatia
- Bairia
- Lauriya
- Bagaha
- Sidhaw
- Madhubani
- Gaunaha
- Narkatiaganj
- Manjhaulia
- Nautan
- Jogapatti
- Ramnagar
- Thakraha
- Bhitaha
- Piprasi

The district is well connected by roads and railways to all major cities.

== Politics ==
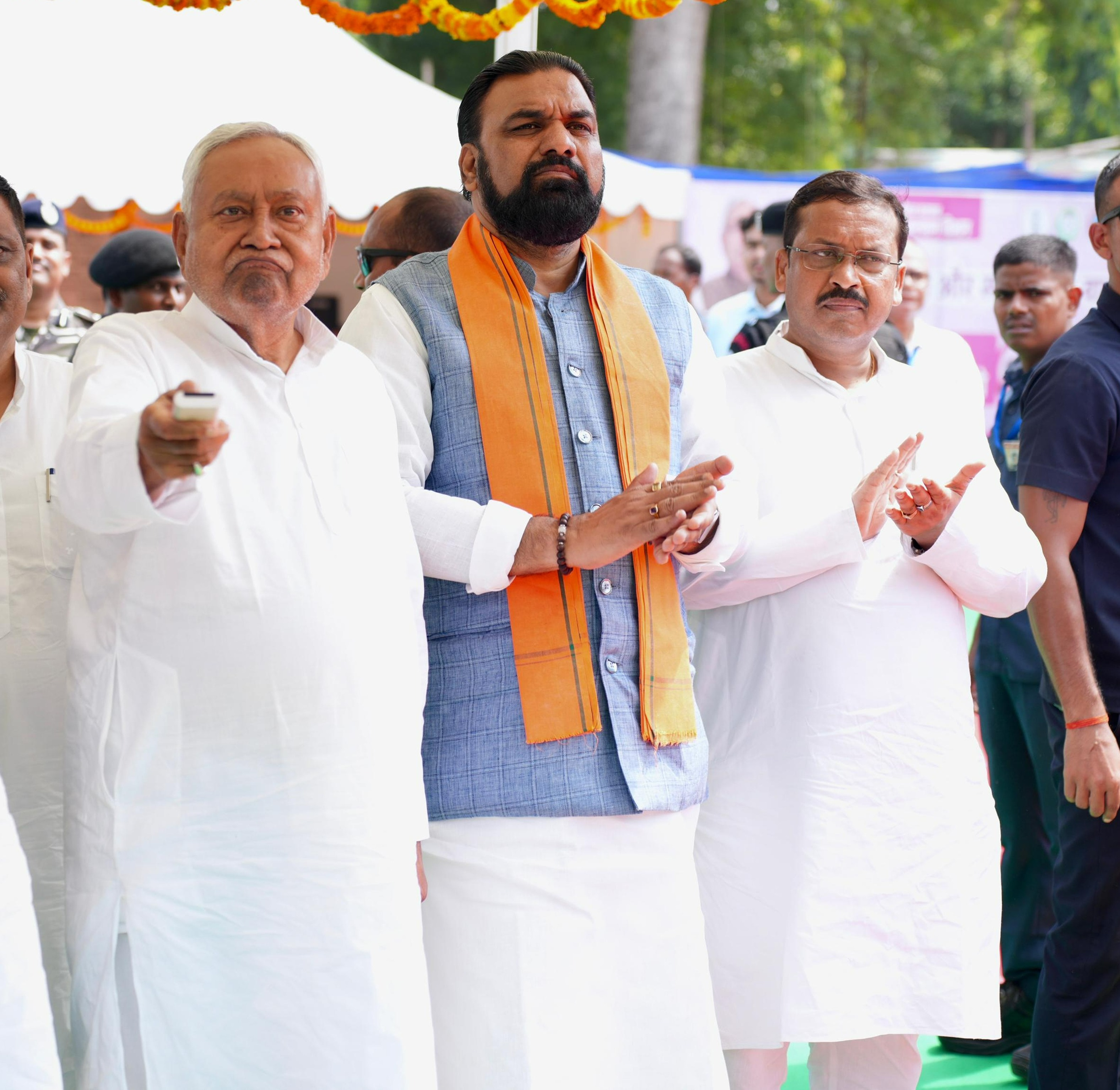
Valmikinagar MP Sunil Kumar Kushwaha (extreme right) inaugurating various projects in West Champaran district with Bihar CM Nitish Kumar and Deputy Chief Minister Samrat Choudhary in 2025.

Lok Sabha constituencies in the district are Paschim Champaran, Valmiki Nagar. Vidhan Sabha constituencies in the district are Valmiki Nagar, Ramnagar, Narkatiaganj, Bagaha, Lauriya, Nautan, Chanpatia, Bettiah, Sikta

District	No.	Constituency	Name	Party	Alliance	Remarks
West Champaran	1	Valmiki Nagar	Surendra Prasad Kushwaha	INC	MGB	
West Champaran	2	Ramnagar (SC)	Nand Kishor Ram	BJP	NDA	
West Champaran	3	Narkatiaganj	Sanjay Kumar Pandey	BJP	NDA	
West Champaran	4	Bagaha	Ram Singh	BJP	NDA	
West Champaran	5	Lauriya	Vinay Bihari	BJP	NDA	
West Champaran	6	Nautan	Narayan Prasad	BJP	NDA	Minister
West Champaran	7	Chanpatia	Abhishek Ranjan	INC	MGB	
West Champaran	8	Bettiah	Renu Devi	BJP	NDA	
West Champaran	9	Sikta	Sammridh Varma	JD(U)	NDA	

== Demographics ==
Historical population
Year	Pop.	±% p.a.
1901	762,628	—
1911	812,855	+0.64%
1921	826,679	+0.17%
1931	913,931	+1.01%
1941	1,021,217	+1.12%
1951	1,071,382	+0.48%
1961	1,325,122	+2.15%
1971	1,587,019	+1.82%
1981	1,972,610	+2.20%
1991	2,333,666	+1.70%
2001	3,043,466	+2.69%
2011	3,935,042	+2.60%

Religions in West Champaran district (2011)
Religion	Percent
Hinduism	77.44%
Islam	21.98%
Other or not stated	0.58%

According to the 2011 census West Champaran district has a population of 3,935,042, roughly equal to the nation of Liberia or the US state of Oregon. This gives it a ranking of 63rd in India (out of a total of 640). The district has a population density of 750 inhabitants per square kilometre (1,900/sq mi). Its population growth rate over the decade 2001-2011 was 28.89%. Pashchim Champaran has a sex ratio of 906 females for every 1000 males, and a literacy rate of 58.06%. 9.99% of the population lives in urban areas. Scheduled Castes and Tribes made up 14.08% and 6.35% of the population respectively.

=== Languages ===
Languages of West Champaran district (2011)
1. Bhojpuri (91.9%)
2. Hindi (3.32%)
3. Urdu (2.97%)
4. Bengali (0.99%)
5. Others (0.86%)

At the time of the 2011 Census of India, 91.86% of the population in the district spoke Bhojpuri, 3.32% Hindi and 2.97% Urdu as their first language.

Languages include Bhojpuri, a language in the Bihari language group with almost 51 million speakers, written in both the Devanagari and Kaithi scripts.

== Notable people ==
- Manoj Bajpayee, film actor.
- Vinay Bihari, actor, lyricist.
- Sanjay Jaiswal, politician
- Prakash Jha, film director.
- Manish Jha, film director and theatre actor.
- Sanjeev K Jha, script writer, filmmaker
- Sunil Kumar Kushwaha , Member of Parliament
- Baidyanath Prasad Mahto, politician, Member of Parliament.
- Krishna Kumar Mishra, politician.
- Vikas Mishra, economist, writer an academic administrator
- Gopal Singh Nepali, Hindi poet.
- Gauri Shankar Pandey, politician.
- Kedar Pandey, former Chief Minister of Bihar
- Raghaw Sharan Pandey, IAS (Retd), former Union Petroleum Secretary, politician
- Damodar Raao, film music director, actor & singer
- Valmiki Rishi, an ascetic who wrote Hindu epic Ramayana here.

== See also ==
- Motihari
- Champaran District
