= Valmiki Nagar (disambiguation) =

Valmiki Nagar may refer to

in Bihar

- Valmiki National Park
- Valmiki Nagar Assembly constituency
- Valmiki Nagar Lok Sabha constituency
- Valmikinagar Road railway station

in Maharashtra

- Valmiki Nagar village
