= Mehura =

- Village
- Country: India
- State: Bihar
- District: West Champaran

Languages
  - Official: Hindi, Bhojpuri
- Time zone: UTC+5:30 (IST)
- PIN: 845101
- ISO 3166 code: IN-BR
- Nearest city: Bagaha
- Lok Sabha constituency: Bagaha
- Vidhan Sabha constituency: Bagaha

Mehura is a village in West Champaran district in the Indian state of Bihar.

It is located near Bagaha and falls under the Bagaha Lok Sabha and Vidhan Sabha constituencies. The primary languages spoken in the village are Hindi and Bhojpuri .
