= Valmiki Nagar Lok Sabha constituency =

Lok Sabha Constituency in Bihar

Coordinates: 27.43°N 83.91°E

Valmiki Nagar
- Lok Sabha constituency

Constituency details
- Country: India
- Region: East India
- State: Bihar
- Assembly constituencies: Valmiki Nagar; Ramnagar; Narkatiaganj; Bagaha; Lauriya; Sikta
- Established: 2008
- Reservation: None

Member of Parliament
- 18th Lok Sabha
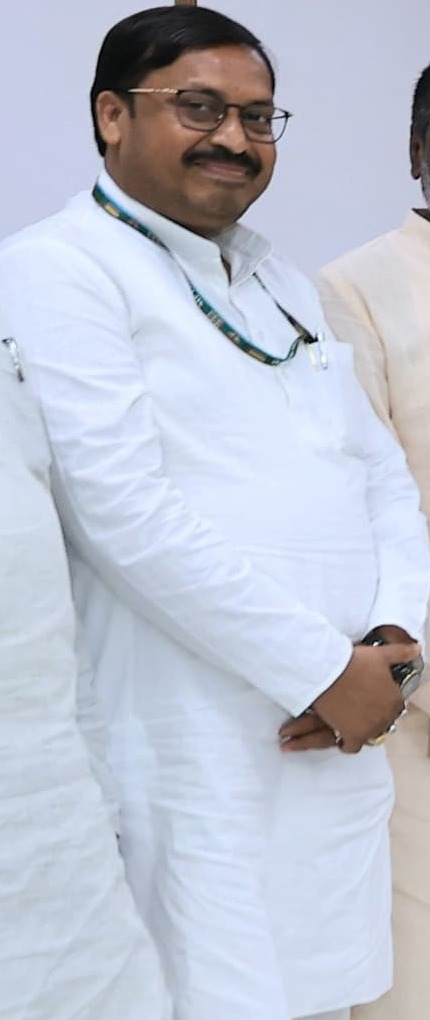
- Incumbent Sunil Kumar
- Party: JD(U)
- Alliance: NDA
- Elected year: 2020

Valmiki Nagar Lok Sabha constituency is one of the 40 Lok Sabha (parliamentary) constituencies in Bihar state in eastern India. This constituency came into existence in 2008, following delimitation of the parliamentary constituencies based on the recommendations of the Delimitation Commission of India constituted in 2002.

Most successful parties from Valmiki Nagar Lok Sabha
1. JD(U) (4 times) (80.0%)
2. BJP (1 time) (20.0%)

== Assembly segments ==
This constituency comprises the following six Vidhan Sabha (legislative assembly) segments:

#	Name	District	Member	Party	2024 Lead
1	Valmiki Nagar	West Champaran	Surendra Kushwaha	INC	JD(U)
2	Ramnagar (SC)	West Champaran	Nand Kishor Ram	BJP	JD(U)
3	Narkatiaganj	West Champaran	Sanjay Pandey	BJP	JD(U)
4	Bagaha	West Champaran	Ram Singh	BJP	JD(U)
5	Lauriya	West Champaran	Vinay Bihari	BJP	JD(U)
9	Sikta	West Champaran	Sammridh Varma	JD(U)	JD(U)

== Members of Parliament ==
Year	Name	Party
Till 2008 : See Bagaha
2009	Baidyanath Prasad Mahto	Janata Dal (United)
2014	Satish Chandra Dubey	Bharatiya Janata Party
2019	Baidyanath Prasad Mahto	Janata Dal (United)
2020^	Sunil Kumar Kushwaha	Janata Dal (United)
2024	Sunil Kumar Kushwaha	Janata Dal (United)

^ bye-poll

== Election results ==
=== 2024 General Election ===
2024 Indian general elections Valmiki Nagar
Party	Candidate	Votes	%	±%
JD(U)	Sunil Kumar Kushwaha	523,422	47.50	▲9.42
RJD	Deepak Yadav	4,24,747	38.55	New
ASP(KR)	Shaifi Mohammad Miya	13,432	1.22	
NOTA	None of the above	30,709	2.79	
Majority		98,675	8.95	
Turnout		11,03,474	60.33	
JD(U) hold		Swing		

=== 2020 Bye- Election ===
Bye-elections were needed due to the death of the sitting MP, Baidyanath Prasad Mahto. Sunil Kumar, Mahto's son won the by-election.

Bye-election, 2020: Valmiki Nagar
Party	Candidate	Votes	%	±%
JD(U)	Sunil Kumar Kushwaha	403,360	38.08	▼20.31
INC	Pravesh Kumar Mishra	3,80,821	35.95	▲11.92
BPP	Shailendra Kumar	1,09,711	10.36	▲10.36
RLSP	Prem Kumar Chaudhary	52,396	4.95	▲4.95
NOTA	None of the Above	41,041	3.87	▲0.53
Majority		22,539	2.13	
Turnout		10,61,198	61.36	
JD(U) hold		Swing		

=== 2019 general election ===
2019 Indian general elections: Valmiki Nagar
Party	Candidate	Votes	%	±%
JD(U)	Baidyanath Prasad Mahto	6,02,660	58.39	▲49.32
INC	Shashwat Kedar	2,48,044	24.03	▼3.32
BSP	Deepak Yadav	62,963	6.10	▲
Independent	Suresh Sah	14,870	1.44	▲
NOTA	None of the Above	34,338	3.33	▲1.61
Majority		3,54,616	34.36	
Turnout		10,32,090	61.97	
JD(U) gain from BJP		Swing		

=== 2014 general elections ===
2014 Indian general elections: Valmiki Nagar
Party	Candidate	Votes	%	±%
BJP	Satish Chandra Dubey	3,64,013	40.44	+40.44
INC	Purnmasi Ram	2,46,218	27.35	+22.88
JD(U)	Baidyanath Prasad Mahto	81,612	9.07	−37.33
Independent	Dilip Varma	58,817	6.53	+6.53
BED	Amar Sahani	35,888	3.99	+3.99
JMM	Prof. Amaresh Prasad	27,603	3.07	+3.07
NOTA	None of the Above	15,515	1.72	
CPI(ML)L	Virendra Prasad Gupta	12,581	1.40	−0.89
BSP	Shailesh Kumar Diwakar	11,668	1.30	−6.40
Majority		1,17,795	13.09	
Turnout		9,00,127	61.80	
BJP gain from JD(U)		Swing		

=== 2009 general elections ===
2009 Indian general elections: Valmiki Nagar
Party	Candidate	Votes	%	±%
JD(U)	Baidyanath Prasad Mahto	2,77,696	46.40	
Independent	Fakhruddin	94,021	15.71	
BSP	Manan Kumar Mishra	46,058	7.70	
RJD	Raghunath Jha	45,699	7.64	
NCP	Dilip Varma	38,650	6.46	
INC	Mohammad Shamim Akhtar	26,762	4.47	
Majority		1,83,675	30.69	
Turnout		5,98,447	46.91	
JD(U) win (new seat)				

== See also ==
- Bagaha (Lok Sabha constituency)
- West Champaran district
- List of constituencies of the Lok Sabha
