= Shikarpur, Bihar Assembly constituency =

Coordinates: 27°06′32″N 84°28′05″E

Shikarpur
- Former constituency for the Bihar Legislative Assembly

Constituency details
- Country: India
- Region: East India
- State: Bihar
- District: Paschim Champaran
- Lok Sabha constituency: Bagaha
- Established: 1951
- Abolished: 2010

Shikarpur Assembly constituency was an assembly constituency in Paschim Champaran district in the Indian state of Bihar. It was reserved for scheduled castes.

== Overview ==
It was part of Bagaha Lok Sabha constituency.

As a consequence of the orders of the Delimitation Commission of India, Shikarpur Assembly constituency ceased to exist in 2010.

== Members of Vidhan Sabha ==
Year	Member	Party
1952		
1957	Sinheshwar Prasad Verma	Praja Socialist Party
1962	Umesh Prasad Verma	Indian National Congress
1967	Bhola Ram Toofani	Praja Socialist Party
1969	Sita Ram Prasad	Bharatiya Jana Sangh
1972	Sita Ram Prasad	Indian National Congress
1977	Sita Ram Prasad	Indian National Congress
1980	Sita Ram Prasad	Indian National Congress (I)
1985	Narsingh Baitha	Indian National Congress
1990	Bhola Ram Toofani	Janata Dal
1995	Bhola Ram Toofani	Janata Dal
2000	Bhagirathi Devi	Bharatiya Janata Party
2005	Subodh Kumar	Nationalist Congress Party
2005	Bhagirathi Devi	Bharatiya Janata Party
2010 onwards: See Narkatiaganj
