= Sunil Kumar Kushwaha =

Indian politician

Sunil Kumar
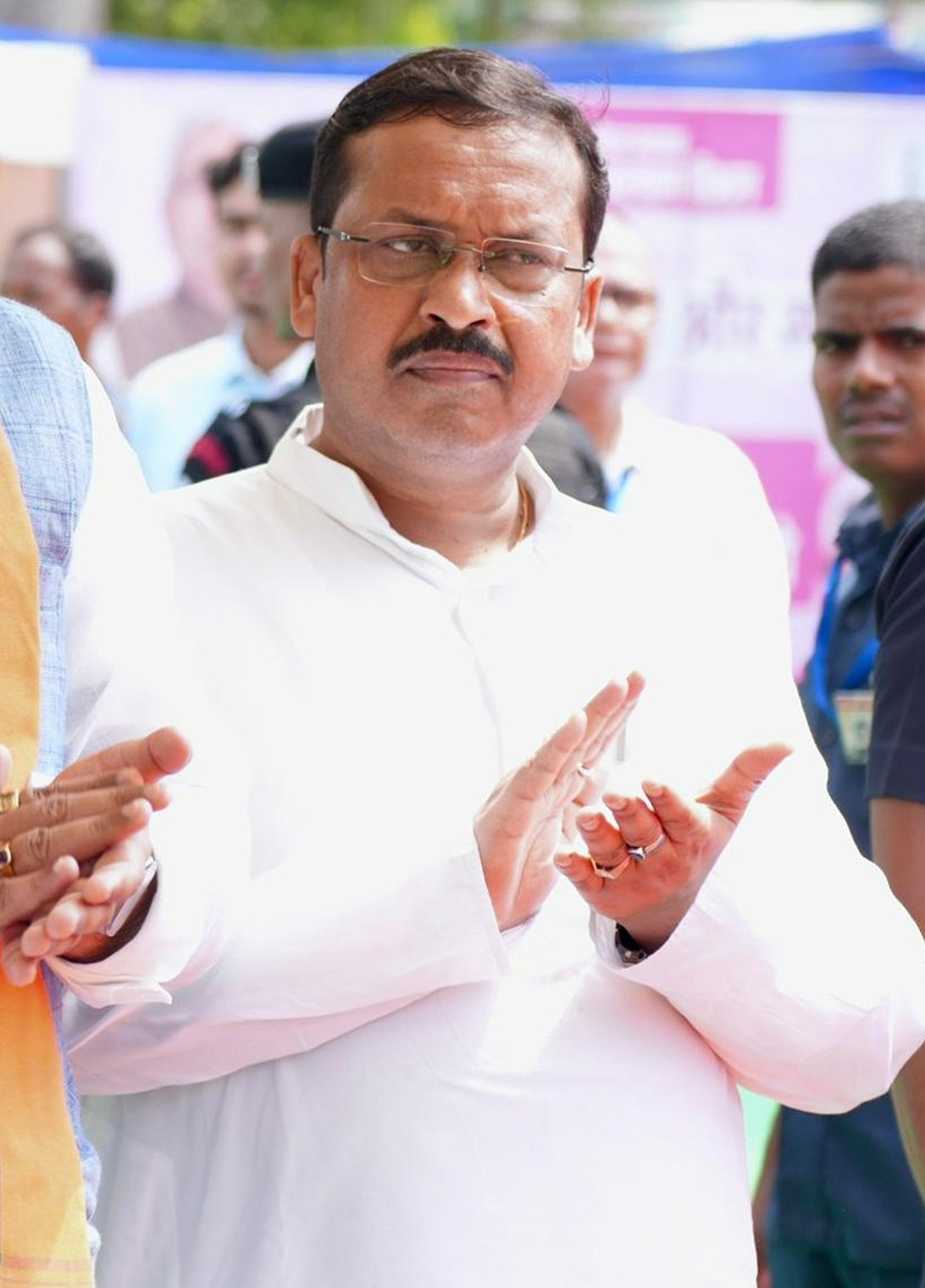

Member of Parliament, Lok Sabha
- Incumbent
- Assumed office 7 November 2020
- Preceded by: Baidyanath Prasad Mahto
- Constituency: Valmiki Nagar

Personal details
- Party: Janata Dal (United)
- Parent: Baidyanath Prasad Mahto (father)
- Education: Bachelor of Arts (History)
- Alma mater: M.J.K. College, Bettiah, West Champaran, Bihar; Babasaheb Bhimrao Ambedkar Bihar University

Sunil Kumar Kushwaha alias Sunil Kumar is an Indian politician. He was elected to the Lok Sabha, the lower house of the Parliament of India from Valmiki Nagar, Bihar in the 2020 Bypoll of Valmiki Nagar as member of the Janata Dal (United). He retained this constituency by winning it once again in the 2024 Indian general elections on the symbol of Janata Dal (United).

== Personal life and career ==
Sunil Kumar was born to veteran Janata Dal (United) leader and parliamentarian Baidyanath Prasad Mahto. He started his political career by winning the by election from Valmikinagar Lok Sabha constituency after the death of his father, who was the sitting member of parliament from the constituency. In 2024, he was again made the candidate of Janata Dal (United) to contest the Lok Sabha election from this constituency. He faced Deepak Yadav of Rashtriya Janata Dal. In this election, Bhojpuri singer and actor Khesari Lal Yadav and Vinay Bihari campaigned for him.

Sunil is considered as a mass leader and is known for groundwork and frequently visiting his constituency and his voters. In 2022, after the tragic incident of shootout at the residence of Narkatiaganj based businessman Guddu Barnwal, he announced that he could even lift the weapon to protect his people. He justified his statement by reminding his constituency that his father Baidyanath Prasad Mahto formed Gram Raksha Dal Shaheedi Jatha to take on the bandits of Champaran region in early nineties and he can trace the footprint of his father for the welfare of his people.

In his first tenure as a parliamentarian, he raised the matter of National Highway no. 727, which was not completed in the span of four years causing difficulties to the people. He also pointed out that near Lauriya toll tax was being collected despite the fact that the service was not being provided to the commuters properly. In 2023, he also raised up the issue of reconstruction of Valmikinagar Airport for the promotion of tourism in the region. In his parliamentary address given during Zero hour, he drew the attention of the seat of Lok Sabha on the importance of Valmikinagar constituency, given its proximity to Nepal. According to him, being connected to Sita of Ramayana and harbouring the only tiger reserve of Bihar, presence of a functional airport may boost the tourism potential in the region.

== Second term (2024-29) ==
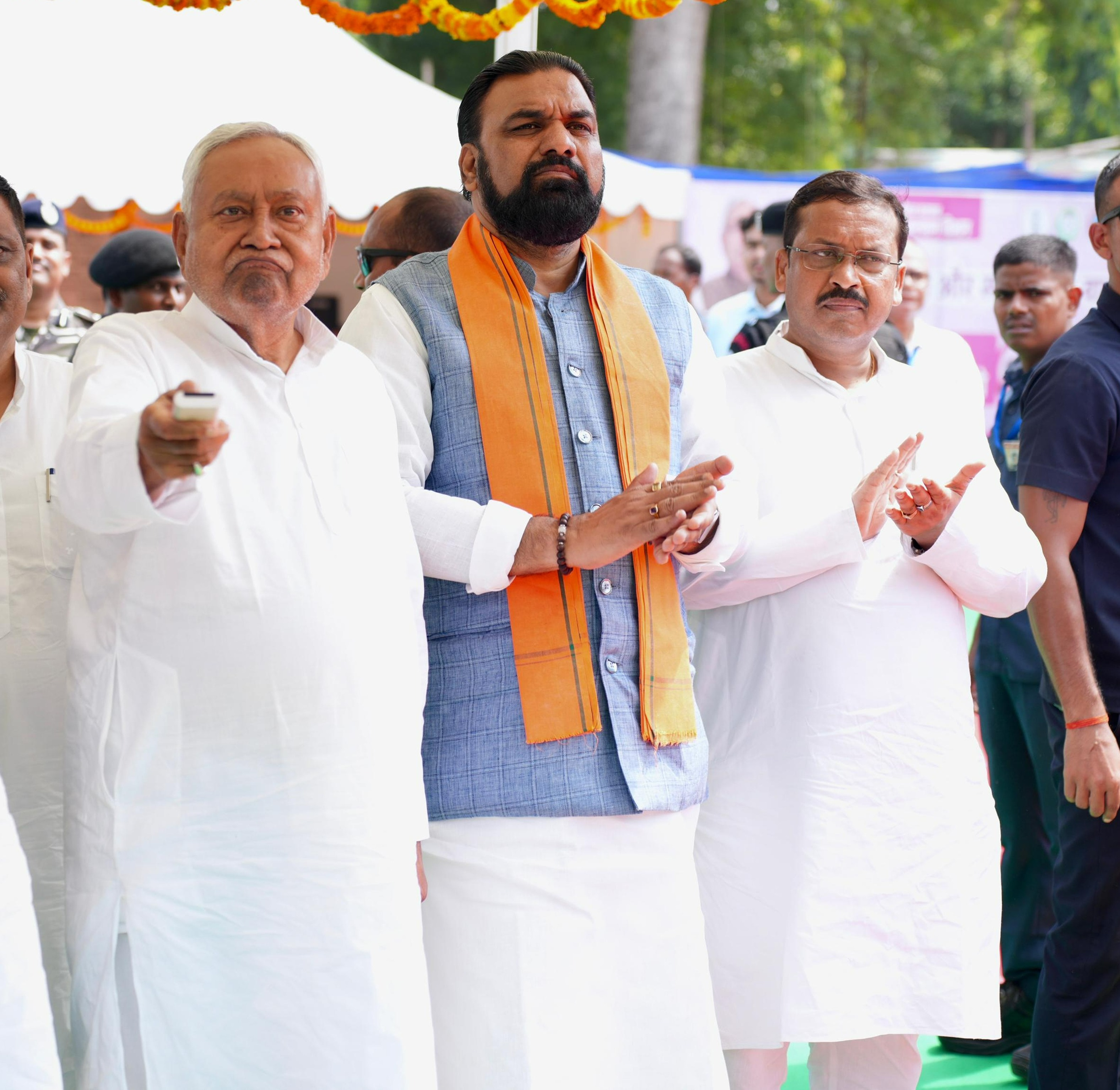
Sunil Kumar Kushwaha launching various developmental projects in West Champaran district with Bihar Chief Minister, Nitish Kumar and Deputy Chief Minister Samrat Choudhary in 2025.

In 2024, Kumar was on a field visit of the flood affected regions of his constituency. Thereby, in the Piprasi bloc of Bagaha, he was rounded up by the people who complained against the rural works department of Government of Bihar. The villagers told him that the sole bridge across the Bansi river that they used to commute across the river was destabilized by the rural works department and an alternative bridge is not being constructed at the required pace. Kumar called the engineer of the rural works department and reprimanded him to complete the work on time.

== See also ==
- Khiru Mahto
