= Chamua =

Village in Bihar, India

Chamua is a village located in West Champaran district of Bihar state, India. The village is 7 km from Narkatiaganj and Ramnagar (Harinagar). Chamua has its own Gram Panchayat, a primary school, a high school, a primary health centre. As per the Census of India 2011, Chamua has a population of 2494 persons with 1281 male and 1213 female.

== Transport ==
Chamua railway station is situated on Muzaffarpur–Gorakhpur main line under the Samastipur railway division of East Central Railway zone. This village falls under Narkatiyaganj Sub Division.
