= Bawangarhi =

Bawangarhi is located approximately 8 km from Tribeni on the Indo Nepalese border. The term Bawangarhi literally means 52 forts. This name is given to ancient remains of some fortification along the Gandak River.

== Geography ==
The place falls under a village named Darwabari in Bagaha-II block in West Champaran district of Bihar, India. The 52 forts (the number of remains may not actually add up to 52) resemble ramparts and massive embankments along the river for the purpose of holding water and saving banks from flooding. Adjacent to 52 forts is a place called 53 bazaar (there are no 53 bazaars in reality). No trustworthy information is available as the history of Bawangarhi though legends abound.

The place has been in ruins for a long time though it has a great potential to be developed as a tourist spot. The adjoining jungles of Valmikinagar are part of Project Tiger and some part of it has already been declared as sanctuary. Years of neglect and poor law and order situation in the state of Bihar kept this place hidden from the tourist map.
