= Satish Chandra Dubey =

Indian politician

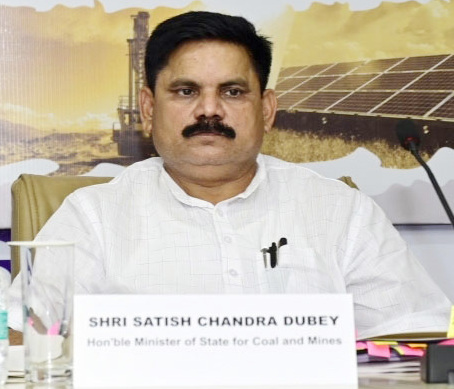

Member of Parliament, Rajya Sabha
- Incumbent
- Assumed office 9 October 2019
- Preceded by: Ram Jethmalani
- Constituency: Bihar

Minister of State in Ministry of Mines and Ministry of Coal
- Incumbent
- Assumed office 11 June 2024
- Prime Minister: Narendra Modi

Member of Parliament, Lok Sabha
- In office 16 May 2014 – 23 May 2019
- Preceded by: Baidyanath Prasad Mahto
- Succeeded by: Baidyanath Prasad Mahto
- Constituency: Valmiki Nagar (Lok Sabha constituency)

Member of Bihar Legislative Assembly
- In office 24 November 2010 – 16 May 2014
- Preceded by: constituency created
- Succeeded by: Rashmi Varma
- Constituency: Narkatiaganj (Vidhan Sabha constituency)
- In office 27 February 2005 – 24 November 2010
- Preceded by: Krishna Kumar Mishra
- Succeeded by: Chandra Mohan Rai
- Constituency: Chanpatia (Vidhan Sabha constituency)

Personal details
- Born: 2 May 1975 (age 50) Bettiah, Bihar, India
- Party: Bharatiya Janata Party
- Spouse: Alka Kumari
- Children: 03
- Profession: Politician
- Source

Satish Chandra Dubey (born 2 May 1975) is an Indian politician and the Minister of State of Coal and Mines in the Government of India. He is a Member of Rajya Sabha from Bihar currently. He won the 2014 Indian general election from Valmiki Nagar (Lok Sabha constituency) being a Bhartiya Janata Party candidate. He was earlier elected to the Bihar Legislative Assembly from Narkatiaganj (Vidhan Sabha constituency) in 2010. He serves as a Member of the 'Standing Committee on Labour'.

== See also ==
- Third Modi ministry

Lok Sabha
Preceded by Baidyanath Prasad Mahto	Member of Parliament for Valmiki Nagar; 2014 – 2019	Succeeded by Baidyanath Prasad Mahto
