= Rashmi Varma =

Indian politician

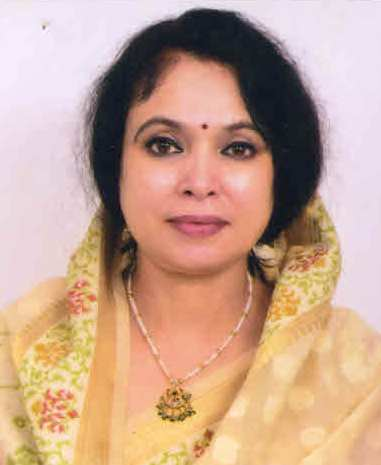

Member of Bihar Legislative Assembly
- In office 2020–2025
- Preceded by: Vinay Varma
- Succeeded by: Sanjay Pandey
- Constituency: Narkatiaganj
- In office 2014–2015
- Preceded by: Satish Chandra Dubey
- Succeeded by: Vinay Varma
- Constituency: Narkatiaganj

Personal details
- Born: 4 January 1967 (age 59)
- Party: Bharatiya Janata Party
- Occupation: Politician

Rashmi Varma is an Indian politician from Bihar. She represented the BJP in the Narkatiaganj in the Bihar Legislative Assembly. She won the 2014 by-elections from Narkatiaganj in Paschim Champaran district of Bihar. She was former Mayor of Narkatiaganj. She won the 2020 elections from Narkatiaganj by defeating Vinay Verma contesting from INC.

== Early life ==
Varma is from Narkatiaganj, Paschim Champaran district, Bihar. She was married to the late Alok Prasad Verma. She completed her B.A. in philosophy in 1988 at Miranda House which is affiliated with the Delhi University, Delhi.

== Career ==
Varma was first elected as an MLA from the Narkatiaganj Assembly constituency in the 2014 by election representing the Bharatiya Janata Party. She defeated her nearest rival Fakhruddin Khan of the Congress by a margin of 15,742 votes. The seat fell vacant after sitting MLA Satish Chandra Dubey of the BJP was elected as an MP in the 2014 Indian general election from Valmiki Nagar Lok Sabha constituency. In the 2015 Bihar Legislative Assembly election she was denied a ticket by the BJP and she contested as an independent candidate and polled 41,151 votes but could only finish third. Vinay Varma of the Indian National Congress won by a margin of 16,061 votes and defeated second placed Renu Devi of the BJP.

She regained the Narkatiaganj seat for the BJP in the 2020 Bihar Legislative Assembly election, this time defeating the Congress candidate Vinay Varma by a margin of 21,134 votes.

== Threats and controversy ==
Varma was threatened to not contest the elections through a letter outside her house. It was pointed out that her children won't be safe if she would contest the election. Rashmi Varma, right after being elected, was threatened via a phone call to be killed if she won't pay a ransom of INR 25,00,000 for her own life. However, the person threatening was arrested with the help of local police and administration.

In January 2022, she submitted her resignation to the speaker of the house. It was speculated that the reason was her brother Roy Anup Prasad's arrest, following the alleged paper leak case of the Uttar Pradesh Teachers Eligibility Test (UPTET).
