= Bagaha Assembly constituency =

Coordinates: 27°06′36″N 84°04′35″E

Bagaha
- Constituency No. 4 for the Bihar Legislative Assembly

Constituency details
- Country: India
- Region: East India
- State: Bihar
- Division: Tirhut
- District: Paschim Champaran
- Lok Sabha constituency: 1. Valmiki Nagar
- Established: 1957
- Total electors: 318,191
- Reservation: None

Member of Legislative Assembly
- 18th Bihar Legislative Assembly
- Incumbent Ram Singh
- Party: BJP
- Alliance: NDA
- Elected year: 2025
- Preceded by: Raghaw Sharan Pandey

Bagaha Assembly constituency is an assembly constituency in Paschim Champaran district in the Indian state of Bihar. It was earlier reserved for scheduled castes.

== Overview ==
As per orders of Delimitation of Parliamentary and Assembly constituencies Order, 2008, 4. Bagaha Assembly constituency is composed of the following: Bagaha community development block including Bagaha nagar parishad; and Bairagi, Sonbarsha, Vairati Bariarwa, Kharhat Tribhauni, Chamawalia and Paikwalia Maryadpur of Sidhaw CD Block.

Bagaha Assembly constituency is part of 1. Valmiki Nagar (Lok Sabha constituency). It was earlier part of Bagaha (Lok Sabha constituency).

== Members of the Legislative Assembly ==
| Year | Name | Party |
|---|---|---|
Before 1957: See Bagaha-cum-Ramnagar
| 1957 | Kedar Pandey | Indian National Congress |
| 1957 | Narsingh Baitha | Indian National Congress |
| 1962 | Narsingh Baitha | Indian National Congress |
| 1967 | Narsingh Baitha | Indian National Congress |
| 1969 | Narsingh Baitha | Indian National Congress |
| 1972 | Narsingh Baitha | Indian National Congress |
| 1977 | Narsingh Baitha | Indian National Congress |
| 1980 | Triloki Harijan | Indian National Congress (I) |
| 1985 | Triloki Harijan | Indian National Congress |
| 1990 | Purnmasi Ram | Janata Dal |
| 1995 | Purnmasi Ram | Janata Dal |
| 2000 | Purnmasi Ram | Rashtriya Janata Dal |
| 2005 | Purnmasi Ram | Janata Dal (United) |
| 2005 | Purnmasi Ram | Janata Dal (United) |
| 2009^ | Kailash Baitha | Janata Dal (United) |
| 2010 | Prabhat Ranjan Singh | Janata Dal (United) |
| 2015 | Raghaw Sharan Pandey | Bharatiya Janata Party |
| 2020 | Ram Singh | Bharatiya Janata Party |
| 2025 | Ram Singh | Bharatiya Janata Party |

^by-election

== Election results ==
=== 2025 ===
2025 Bihar Legislative Assembly election: Bagaha
| Party | Candidate | Votes | % | ±% |
|---|---|---|---|---|
| BJP | Ram Singh | 106,875 | 47.39 | −2.12 |
| INC | Jayesh Mangal Singh | 100,562 | 44.59 | +11.59 |
| JSP | Nandesh Pandey | 5,799 | 2.57 | |
| Independent | Dinesh Agrawal | 4,239 | 1.88 | |
| ASP(KR) | Mahfooz Alam | 2,659 | 1.18 | |
| NOTA | None of the above | 3,259 | 1.45 | −0.45 |
| Majority | | 6,313 | 2.8 | −13.71 |
| Turnout | | 225,532 | 70.88 | +11.32 |
| BJP hold | | Swing | | |

=== 2020 ===
Bihar Assembly election, 2020: Bagaha
| Party | Candidate | Votes | % | ±% |
|---|---|---|---|---|
| BJP | Ram Singh | 90,013 | 49.51 | +5.06 |
| INC | Jayesh Mangalam Singh | 59,993 | 33.0 | |
| Independent | Raghaw Sharan Pandey | 6,429 | 3.54 | |
| Jan Sangharsh Dal | Purnmasi Ram | 3,649 | 2.01 | |
| Independent | Kamran Aziz | 3,077 | 1.69 | |
| JP(S) | Suresh Mukhiya | 2,600 | 1.43 | |
| Lok Shakti Party (Loktantrik) | Atul Kumar Shukla | 2,364 | 1.3 | |
| NOTA | None of the above | 3,456 | 1.9 | +0.26 |
| Majority | | 30,020 | 16.51 | +11.62 |
| Turnout | | 181,799 | 59.56 | −1.99 |
| BJP hold | | Swing | | |

=== 2015 ===
2015 Bihar Legislative Assembly election: Bagaha
| Party | Candidate | Votes | % | ±% |
|---|---|---|---|---|
| BJP | Raghaw Sharan Pandey | 74,476 | 44.45 | |
| JD(U) | Bhishm Sahani | 66,293 | 39.56 | |
| BSP | Mohammad Kamran Aziz | 8,292 | 4.95 | |
| Independent | Saket Kumar Pathak | 2,507 | 1.5 | |
| Independent | Shesh Nath Chaudhary | 2,463 | 1.47 | |
| JAP(L) | Mohammad Akbar Khan | 2,355 | 1.41 | |
| Independent | Pashupatinath Gupta | 1,874 | 1.12 | |
| NOTA | None of the above | 2,753 | 1.64 | |
| Majority | | 8,183 | 4.89 | |
| Turnout | | 167,561 | 61.55 | |
| BJP gain from JD(U) | | Swing | | |

=== 2010 ===
2010 Bihar Legislative Assembly election: Bagaha
| Party | Candidate | Votes | % | ±% |
|---|---|---|---|---|
| JD(U) | Prabhat Ranjan Singh | 67,510 | 50.40 | |
| RJD | Ram Prasad Yadav | 18,455 | 13.78 | |
| BSP | MD. Kamran | 18,341 | 13.69 | |
| JPS | Bhisam Sahni | 8,150 | 6.08 | |
| INC | Ranjeet Rao | 6,177 | 4.61 | |
| Majority | | 49,055 | 36.62 | |
| Turnout | | 1,33,942 | 58.20 | |
| Registered electors | | | | |
| JD(U) hold | | Swing | | |
