= List of songs recorded by Pawan Singh =

Pawan Singh (born 5 January 1986) is an Indian playback singer, actor, composer, and stage performer, primarily known for his contributions to the Bhojpuri film industry.

== Music career ==
Singh's first album was Odhaniya Wali, released in 2000.. He made his acting debut in the 2006 film Rangli Chunariya Tohre Naam. In 2008, Singh released the album Lollipop Lageli, which included the song "Lollipop Lagelu." The same year, he released another album, Don't Touch My Body, featuring the song "Saniya Mirza Cut Nathuniya." He made his acting debut in the 2006 film Rangli Chunariya Tohre Naam. In 2020, he made his Bollywood debut with the song "Kamariya Hila Rahi Hai" featuring American dancer and actress Lauren Gottlieb. His second Bollywood single was "Babuni Tere Rang Me", a Holi song featuring Tridha Choudhury, followed by "Current" featuring Payal Dev. In 2021, he recorded a Chhath song with Sonu Nigam and released Bhojpuri cover versions of popular Bollywood songs like "Lut Gaye (Bhojpuri)" and "Barish Ban Jana". He later released a remake of the Hindi song "Tumsa Koi Pyara" from the film Khuddar (1994) in Bhojpuri. His next Bhojpuri single, "Zindagi", was a collaboration with Haryanvi singer Renuka Panwar.

He also sang in several Hindi films including Stree 2 and Vicky Vidya Ka Woh Wala Video. Singh was nominated for the Filmfare Award for Best Male Playback Singer for his rendition of "Aayi Nai" and won the TOIFA 2025 Song of the Year award. Pawan Singh is set to feature in the upcoming film Dacoit: A Love Story. The film's most anticipated track, "Touch Buddy" (known as "Chicchubuddi" in Telugu), is a collaboration with Jonita Gandhi, featuring music by Bheems Ceciroleo. He received the Best Male Singer Award at the International Bhojpuri Film Awards in 2016.

== Bhojpuri Album songs ==
Year	Album/Single	Song	Music	Lyrics	Co-singer(s)	Notes
1997	Odhaniya Wali	"Odhaniya Wali"				
2008	Lollipop Lageli	"Lollipo Lagelu"				
2008	Dont Touch My Body	"Saniya Mirza Cut Nathuniya"				
2019	Hamar Wala Dance	"Hamar Wala Dance"	Vinay Vinayak	Anupam Pandey		
2021	Barish Ban Jana (Bhojpuri)	"Barish Ban Jana"	Payal Dev	Kunal Verma		
2021	Lut Gaye (Bhojpuri)	"Lut Gaye"	Tanishk Bagchi	Chhotu Yadav		
2021	Pudina (Bhojpuri)	"Pudina A Haseena"	Priyanshu Singh	Kundan Pandey & Arjun Akela		
2021	Jai Chhathi Maiya	"Chala Bhauji Hali Hali"	Chhote Baba "Bashi"	Arun Bihari	Sonu Nigam & Khushboo Jain	
2021	Tumsa Koi Pyara	"Tumsa Koi Pyara"	Priyanshu Singh	Raushan Singh Vishwas		
2021	Jindagi	"Jindagi"	Vinay Vinayak	Pinku Baba		
2022	Jindagi 2.O	"Jindagi 2.O"	Priyanshu Singh	Renuka		
2022	Lal Ghagra	"Lal Ghagra"	Subham Raj	Vijay Chauhan		
2022	Hari Hari Odhani	"Hari Hari Odhani"	Priyanshu Singh	Ashutosh Singh		
2022	Kamariya Patre	"Kamariya Patre Patre"	Priyanshu Singh	Raushan Singh Vishwas		
2022	Saree se Tadi	"Saree Se Tadi"	Arya Sharma	Vijay Chauhan		
2024	Teri Laal Chunariya	"Teri Laal Chunariya"	Javed Mohsin	Rashmi Virag		
2024	Pasrat Pyaar	"Pasrat Pyaar"	Rajnish Mishra	Santosh Utpati		
2024	Sitlahari	"Sitlahari"				
2025	Salwarwa Lale Lal	"Salwarwa Lale Lal"	Priyanshu Singh	Raushan Singh		
2025	Lahangwa Rangab	"Lahangwa Rangab"	Priyanshu Singh	Ashutosh Tiwari		
2025	Kala Odhani	"Kala Odhani"	Priyanshu Singh	Prince Priyadarshi		
2025	Kamariya Pe Saree	"Kamariya Pe Saree"	Shabbir Ahmed	Shabbir Ahmed		
2025	Kawana Kalamawa Se Likhal Karamwa	"Kawana Kalamawa Se Likhal Karamwa"	Priyanshu Singh	Arun Bihari	Priyanka Singh	
2025	Dhamaka	"Dhamaka"	Shubham SBR	Prince Shaan Dubey	Shilpi Raj	Feat. Trishakar Madhu
2026	Devra Nihare	''Devra Nihare''	Priyanshu Singh	Gautam Rai (Kala Naag)		Feat.Neelam Giri
2026	Nach Re Patarki	''Nach Re Patarki''	Deepak Dilkash & Priyanshu Singh	Rahul Yadav		Feat. Shweta Sharma
2026	Lahanga Se Mahanga	"Lahanga Se Mahanga"	Sargam Akash	Bittu Vidyarthi	Shivani Singh	Feat. Niharica Raizada
2026	Naseeb	"Naseeb"	Sargam Akash	Prakash Barud		Feat. Mahima Singh

=== Hindi songs ===
Year	Album/Single	Song	Music	Lyrics	Co-singer(s)	Notes
2020	Kamariya Hila Rahi Hai	"Kamariya Hila Rahi Hai"	Payal Dev	Mohsin Shaikh & Payal Dev	Payal Dev	
2021	Babuni Tere Rang Me	"Babuni Tere Rang Me"	Salim–Sulaiman	Dr. Sagar	Sharvi Yadav	
2021	Current	"Current"	Payal Dev	Mohsin Shaikh & Payal Dev	Mohsin Shaikh & Payal Dev	
2022	Yaad Aati Nahi	"Yaad Aati Nahi"	Salim–Sulaiman	Shradha Pandit		
2023	Tumhare Siva	"Tumhare Siva"	Nikhil–Vinay & Chhote Baba (Basahi)	Faaiz Anwar & Sameer Anjaan	Khusboo Jain	Remake of Tumhare Siva (Film Tum Bin)
2024	Teri Laal Chunariya	"Teri Laal Chunariya"	Javed-Mohsin	Rashmi Virag	Jyotica Tangri	
2025	Pyaar Mein Hain Hum	"Pyaar Mein Hain Hum"	Aditya Dev & Payal Dev	Kunaal Vermaa	Payal Dev	
2025	Shankara	"Shankara"	Ullumanati	Ullumanati		Directed By Ganesh Acharya
2025	Le Jayenge Tere Sajna	"Le Jayenge Tere Sajna"	Shabbir Ahmed	Shabbir Ahmed	Palak Muchhal	

=== Hindi film songs ===
Year	Film	Song	Composer	Lyricist(s)	Co-artist(s)
2024	Stree 2	"Aayi Nai"	Pawan Singh & Sachin-Jigar	Amitabh Bhattacharya	Divya Kumar, Simran Choudhary
2024	Vicky Vidya Ka Woh Wala Video	"Chumma"	Sachin-Jigar	Vayu	Pawan Singh & Rupali Jagga & Rupesh Mishra & Mansa
2026	Dacoit: A Love Story	"Touch Buddy"	Pawan Singh & Jonita Gandhi	Vayu Shrivastav	Bheems Ceciroleo

=== Telugu film song ===
Year	Film	Song	Singer	Lyricist(s)	Music	Notes
2026	Dacoit: A Love Story	"Chicchubuddi"	Pawan Singh & Jonita Gandhi	Bhaskarabhatla	Bheems Ceciroleo	

=== Political songs ===
Year	Album/Single	Song	Music	Lyrics	Co-singer(s)	Notes
2014	Aaeel Jaunpur Ke Beta	Jaunpur Se Delhi	Madhukar Anand	Pyarelal Yadav "Kavi Ji"		For MP Candidate Ravi Kishan From Gorakhpur Lok Sabha
2015	Vote Mange Betwa Tohar	"Vote Mange Betwa Tohar"	Avinash Jha " Ghunghuru Ji "	Vinay Bihari		For BJP MLA Candidate Vinay Bihari
2015	Ago Vote Mangatani	"Ago Vote Mangatani"	Chhote Baba "Basahi"	Vinay Bihari		For BJP MLA Candidate Vinay Bihari
2018	Dhaile Narendra Modi Mathe Daurwa	"Dhaile Narendra Modi Mathe Daurwa"	Om Jha	Vinay Bihari		
2019	Bharat Maa Ka Beta Hai	"Bharat Maa Ka Beta Hai"	Chhotu Rawat	Vinay Bihari		Celebrating the election victory of the BJP.
2019	Vijai Bhaile Mor Lalanawa	"Vijai Bhaile Mor Lalanawa"	Chhotu Rawat	Vinay Bihari	Sona Singh	Celebrating the election victory of the BJP.
2023	Hai Desh Diwana Modi Ka	"Hai Desh Diwana Modi Ka"	Priyanshu Singh & Shubham SBR	Vinay Bihari		To mark Narendra Modi's birthday.
2024	Aashirwad Mange Pawanva	"Aashirwad Mange Pawanva"	Priyanshu Singh	Deepak Singh	Shivani Singh	Pawan Singh had rebelled against the BJP and contested the election as an independent candidate from Karakat.
2025	Ghate Chalale Modi Nitish	"Ghate Chalale Modi Nitish"	Ratnesh Singh	Ashok Shivpuri		
2025	Jodi Modi Nitish Ke Hit Hoi	"Jodi Modi Nitish Ke Hit Hoi"	Priyanshu Singh	Ashok Shivpuri	Shivani Singh	
2025	Jodi Modi Nitish Ke Hit Ho Gail	"Jodi Modi Nitish Ke Hit Ho Gail"	Priyanshu Singh	Ashok Shivpuri	Shivani Singh	In celebration of the massive victory of NDA government in Bihar.

=== Government schemes songs ===
Year	Album/Single	Song	Music	Lyrics	Co-singer(s)	Notes
2020	Aatmnirbhar Hum Bola Vande Matram	"Aatmnirbhar Bharat"	Team Powerstar	Team Powerstar		For Aatmnirbhar Bharat Scheme (Mankind Pharma)
2021	Mera Rozgaar	"Mera Rozgaar"	Chhotu Rawat	Chhotu Yadav		With Sanjay Rai Sherpuria For Government Schemes Youth Rural.
2025	Sindoor	"Sindoor"	Sargam Akash	Chhotu Yadav		On Opration Sindoor
