= Prakash Rai (politician) =

Indian politician

Member of Bihar Legislative Assembly
- In office 2015–2020
- Preceded by: Chandra Mohan Rai
- Succeeded by: Umakant Singh
- Constituency: Chanpatia

Personal details
- Born: 26 June 1954 (age 71)
- Party: Bharatiya Janata Party

Prakash Rai (born 26 June 1954) is an Indian politician and was former member of the Bihar Legislative Assembly. He was elected from the Chanpatia constituency in 2015 as a candidate of the Bharatiya Janata Party. Rai was born in the village of Harinagar in the Darbhanga district of Bihar. He is noted to have had the 3rd lowest winning margin in the 2015 Bihar Legislative Assembly election, winning with a margin of 464 votes and a vote share of 39.04%.
