= Ram Prasad Yadav =

Indian politician

Member of the Bihar Legislative Assembly
- In office 1995–2000
- Preceded by: Chandra Mohan Rai
- Succeeded by: Chandra Mohan Rai
- Constituency: Ramnagar

Personal details
- Party: Rashtriya Janata Dal; Janata Dal
- Parent: Krishna Deo Prasad Yadav
- Education: B.A. From (M.J.K. College) Bettiah
- Occupation: Politician social work

Ram Prasad Yadav is an Indian politician who was elected as a member of Bihar Legislative Assembly from Ramnagar constituency in 1995.

== Political life ==
Yadav Contested Bagaha constituency in 2010 as a Rashtriya Janata Dal candidate but lost to Prabhat Ranjan Singh of Janata Dal (United) He also lost the 2005 election from Lauriya Assembly constituency as candidate of Rashtriya Janata Dal

== See also ==
- Ramnagar, Bihar Assembly constituency
