= Kailash Baitha =

Indian politician

Member of parliament
- In office 2004
- Preceded by: Mahendra Baitha
- Succeeded by: Baidyanath Prasad Mahto
- Constituency: Bagaha

Member of Legislative Assembly
- In office 2009 By Election
- Constituency: Bagaha

Personal details
- Born: 1 January 1948 (age 78) West Champaran, Bihar
- Party: JD(U)
- As of 26 September, 2006

Kailash Baitha (born 1 January 1948) is a member of the 14th Lok Sabha of India. He represents the Bagaha constituency of Bihar and is a member of the Janata Dal (United) political party.
