= Dhanaha Assembly constituency =

Coordinates: 27°04′04″N 84°16′37″E

Dhanaha
- Former constituency for the Bihar Legislative Assembly

Constituency details
- Country: India
- Region: East India
- State: Bihar
- District: Paschim Champaran
- Lok Sabha constituency: Bagaha
- Established: 1951
- Abolished: 2010

Dhanaha Assembly constituency was an assembly constituency in Paschim Champaran district in the Indian state of Bihar.

== Overview ==
It was part of Bagaha Lok Sabha constituency.

As a consequence of the orders of the Delimitation Commission of India, Dhanaha Assembly constituency ceased to exist in 2010.

== Members of Vidhan Sabha ==
Year	Member	Party
1952	Sudama Mishra	Indian National Congress
1957	Jogendra Prasad	Independent
1962	Ranglal Prasad	Indian National Congress
1967	Yogendra Shrivastava	Praja Socialist Party
1969	Yogendra Shrivastava	Praja Socialist Party
1972	Hardev Prasad	Indian National Congress
1977	Hardev Prasad	Indian National Congress
1980	Hardev Prasad	Indian National Congress (I)
1985	Nardeshwar Kushwaha	Lokdal
1990	Shyam N. Prasad	Indian National Congress
1995	Vishnu Prasad Kushwaha	Samata Party
2000	Rajesh Singh	Bahujan Samaj Party
2005	Rajesh Singh	Rashtriya Janata Dal
2005	Rajesh Singh	Rashtriya Janata Dal
2010 onwards: See Valmiki Nagar
