= Dhirendra Pratap Singh =

Indian politician

Member of Bihar Legislative Assembly
- In office 2015–2025
- Succeeded by: Surendra Prasad Kushwaha
- Constituency: Valmiki Nagar

Personal details
- Party: JD(U)
- Occupation: Politics

Dhirendra Pratap Singh alias Rinku Singh is an Indian politician from Janata Dal (United). He was member of the Bihar Legislative Assembly from the Valmiki Nagar seat in West Champaran district of Bihar. He won Valmiki Nagar constituency in 2015 Bihar Legislative Assembly election as an Independent politician later joined Janata Dal (United) and won 2020 Bihar Legislative Assembly election. During Assembly Election 2025, he lost to Congress with a narrow margin.
