= Bhola Raut =

Indian politician

Member of Parliament, Lok Sabha
- In office 1952–1977
- Succeeded by: Jagannath Prasad Swatantra
- In office 1980–1989
- Preceded by: Jagannath Prasad Swatantra
- Succeeded by: Mahendra Baitha
- Constituency: Bagaha, Bihar

Personal details
- Born: 4 November 1914 Bettiah, West Champaran District, British India
- Died: 3 July 1995 (aged 80) East Champaran District, Bihar, India
- Party: Indian National Congress
- Spouse: Babuni Devi
- Children: 4 sons, 1 daughter

Bhola Raut (4 November 1914 – 3 July 1995) was an Indian politician who was a member of the Indian National Congress.

== Personal life ==
Bhola Raut was born on 4 November 1914 into the Mehtar caste to Harihar Raut at Bettiah, Champaran, Bihar and Orissa Province (now West Champaran, Bihar). On 3 July 1995, he was killed in a road accident near the village of Madhuchhapra in East Champaran District.

== Politics ==
He was elected to the lower house of the Indian Parliament, the Lok Sabha, from Bagaha constituency, Bihar, in 1952, 1957, 1962, 1967, 1971, 1980 and 1984. He was also a member of the Provisional Parliament in 1950–51.

He was a former Secretary of Depressed Classes League, General Secretary of Mehtar Dom Sabha, the Vice President of All India Mehtar Mazdoor Sangh, President of Bihar State Safai Mazdoor Sangh and General Secretary of Bihar State Scavengers Association.
