= Chamua railway station =

Railway station in Bihar, India

Chamua

General information
- Location: Dewaliya, Chamua, West Champaran district, Bihar; India
- Coordinates: 27°08′16″N 84°24′03″E
- Elevation: 93 m (305 ft)
- System: Passenger train station
- Owner: Indian Railways
- Operator: East Central Railway
- Line: Muzaffarpur–Gorakhpur main line
- Platforms: 1
- Tracks: 2

Construction
- Structure type: Standard (on ground station)

Other information
- Status: Active
- Station code: CAMU
- Zone(s): East Central Railway zone
- Division(s): Samastipur

History
- Opened: 1930s

Services
Preceding station	Indian Railways	Following station
Harinagar towards ?	East Central Railway zone Muzaffarpur–Gorakhpur main line	Narkatiaganj Junction towards ?
Location

Chamua railway station (station code: CAMU), is a railway station on Muzaffarpur–Gorakhpur main line under the Samastipur railway division of East Central Railway zone. This is situated at Dewaliya, Chamua in West Champaran district of the Indian state of Bihar.
