= Umakant Singh =

Indian politician (born 1974)

Member of Bihar Legislative Assembly
- In office 2020–2025
- Preceded by: Prakash Rai
- Succeeded by: Abhishek Ranjan
- Constituency: Chanpatia

Personal details
- Born: 5 September 1974 (age 51)
- Party: Bharatiya Janata Party
- Occupation: Politician

Umakant Singh (born 5 September 1974) is an Indian politician belonging to Bharatiya Janata Party. He was elected as a member of Bihar Legislative Assembly from 7 Chanpatia constituency, Paschim Champaran in 2020 Bihar Legislative Assembly election. He was elected as Mukhiya (Gram pradhan) in 2001, 2006, 2011 & 2016 from Gonauli Panchayat, West Champaran, Bihar. He also owns many businesses and is a Millionaire in Net Worth. He is Bhumihar by Caste and is popular among local bhumihar people as their power symbol
