= Ramnagar, West Champaran =

Ramnagar
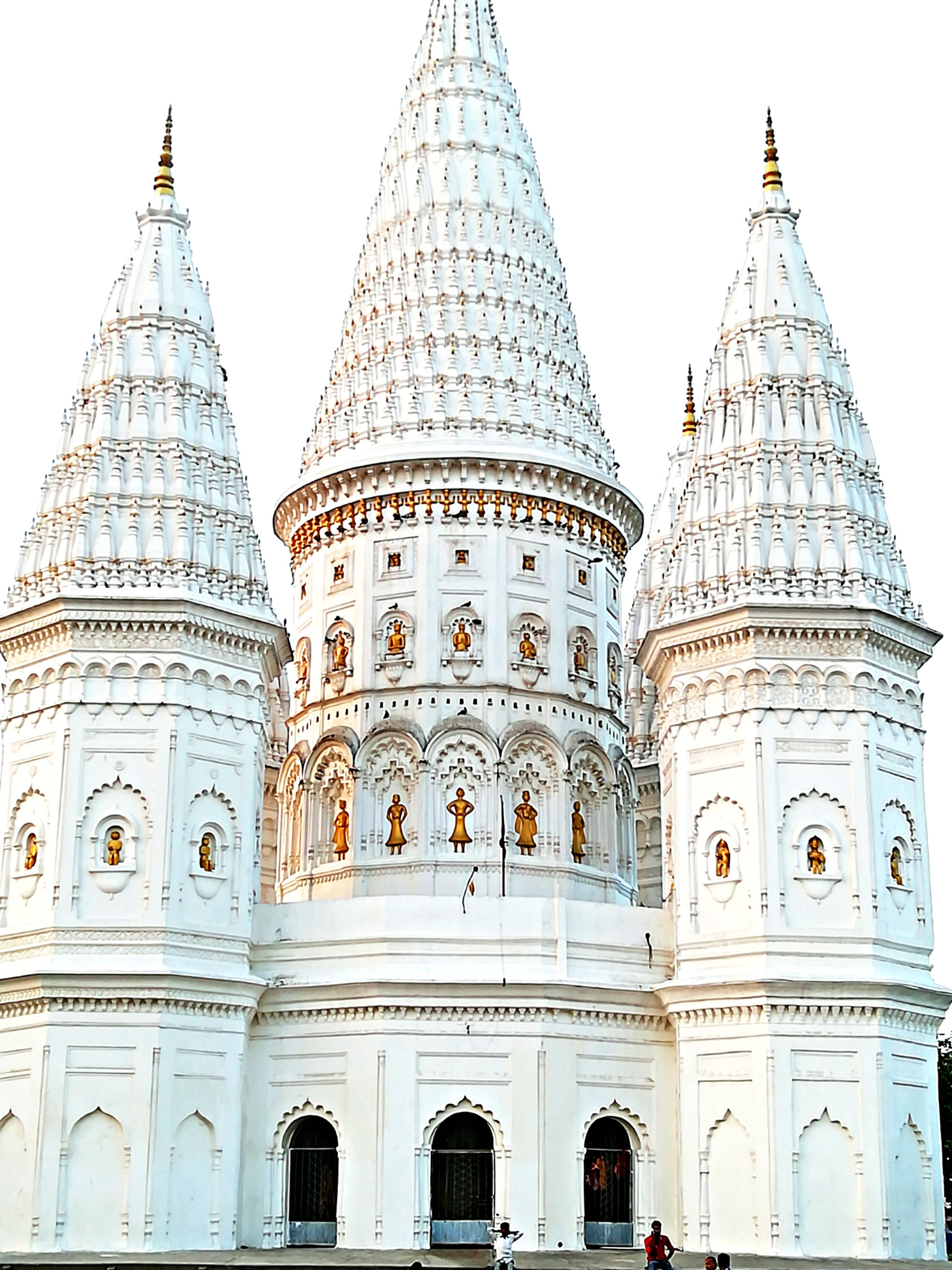
- Town Shiv Mandir Ramnagar pic credit : Apurv Shrivastva

- Location in Bihar, India
- Coordinates: 27.17°N 84.32°E
- Country: India
- State: Bihar
- District: Pashchim Champaran

Government
  - Type: Democratic
- Elevation: 85 m (279 ft)

Population (2011)
  - Total: 249,102

Languages
  - Official: Bhojpuri, Hindi, English
- Time zone: UTC+5:30 (IST)
- PIN: 845106
- ISO 3166 code: IN-BR
- Lok Sabha constituency: Valmiki Nagar
- Vidhan Sabha constituency: Ramnagar
- Website: westchamparan.bih.nic.in

Ramnagar is a town and a notified area in Pashchim Champaran district in the Indian state of Bihar. Ramnagar is situated on the border of India-Nepal and Bihar - Uttar Pradesh.

== Demographics ==
Population
1. Male (52.0%)
2. Female (48.0%)
Residency
1. urban (19.4%)
2. Rural (80.6%)

As of 2011, India census, Ramnagar had a population of 249,102. Males constitute 51.95% of the population and females 48.05%. Ramnagar has an average literacy rate of 55.43%, lower than the national average of 59.5% : The male literacy rate is 52.83% and the female literacy rate is 36.15% in Ramnagar Block. 19% of the population is under 6 years of age. As per Census 2011 out of total population, 19.4% people live in urban areas while 80.6% lives in the rural areas. The average literacy rate in urban areas is 66.4% while that in the rural areas is 52.7%. Also the sex ratio of urban areas in Ramnagar Block is 907 while that of rural areas is 929.

== About ==
- Governing body : Municipal council
- Famous for : Shiv mandir
- Industry established : Harinagar sugar mill Pvt Ltd. & arogya lok
- Environment : Fresh and clean
- Atmosphere : Clean air and green surrounding
- Schools locate here : Gyan Jyoti Public School, Ramnagar central school, Rajhansh public school, St.Xavier's, Friend's academy Etc.
- Near to : Valmikinagar

== Religion-wise Population Ramnagar ==
Religion	Total		Male	Female
Hindu	184,918	(74.23%)	96,409	88,509
Muslim	63,023	(25.3%)	32,395	30,628
Christian	460	(0.18%)	224	236
Sikh	86	(0.03%)	49	37
buddhist	54	(0.02%)	27	27
Jain	30	(0.01%)	16	14
Other religion	3	(0.00%)	3	0
No religion specified	528	(0.21%)	276	252

== Urban/Rural Population - Ramnagar ==
As per Census 2011, there are total 9,123 families under Ramnagar Block living in urban areas while 9,123 families are living within rural areas. Thus around 19.4% of total population of Ramnagar Block lives in urban areas while 80.6% lives under rural areas. Population of children (0 – 6 years) in urban region is 8,146 while that in rural region is 39,558.

	Total	Urben	Rural
Population	249,102	48,411	200,691
Children (0-6 year)	47,704	8,146	39,558
Schedule Caste	41,774	3,986	37,788
Schedule Tribe	39,632	1,306	38,326
Literacy	55.43%	66.37%	52.69%
Sex Ratio	925	907	929

== Working Population - Ramnagar ==
In Ramnagar Block out of total population, 97,049 were engaged in work activities. 64.1% of workers describe their work as Main Work (Employment or Earning more than 6 Months) while 35.9% were involved in Marginal activity providing livelihood for less than 6 months. Of 97,049 workers engaged in Main Work, 9,933 were cultivators (owner or co-owner) while 38,972 were agricultural labourers.

Working population
MALE	Number
Main workers	47,171
Cultivator	08,689
Agrigulture Labour	28,115
Household industries	00,780
Other Workers	9,587
Marginal Workers	17,213
Non Working	65,015

Working population
FEMALE	Number
Main workers	14,990
Cultivator	01,244
Agrigulture Labour	10,857
Household industries	00,289
Other Workers	2,600
Marginal Workers	17,675
Non Working	87,038

== Tourism ==
- Raj Shiv Mandir is a temple in the area. It is a popular temple now which was built by the Raj Durbar. The Vikram Shah dynast have been kings who lived here since the 18th century and have built the temple dedicated to Lord Shiva.
- Ramnagar has an old hamlet with some 100+ households of the Nepali-speaking community, who were part of the Ramnagar Raj way before the Britishers arrived here. The close-knit community are a significant part of the history of Ramnagar.
- Sumeswer Fort is situated on the summit of the Sumeswer hills, at a height of 2,884 feet above sea level, in Ramnagar block. The fort, which stands on the edge of a sharp precipice, is now in ruins, but its remains are well defined and reservoirs cut out of the solid rocks, in which water was stored for the use of the inhabitants, can still be seen. From the ridge upon which Fort Sumeswer is situated here are views of the intervening valleys and low hills of Nepal. The ridge here forms the boundary between West Champaran and Nepal. The Himalayan peaks of Dhoulagiri, Gosainthan and Gaurishanker are all visible.

== Place to know in Ramnagar ==
Chitragupt Mandir

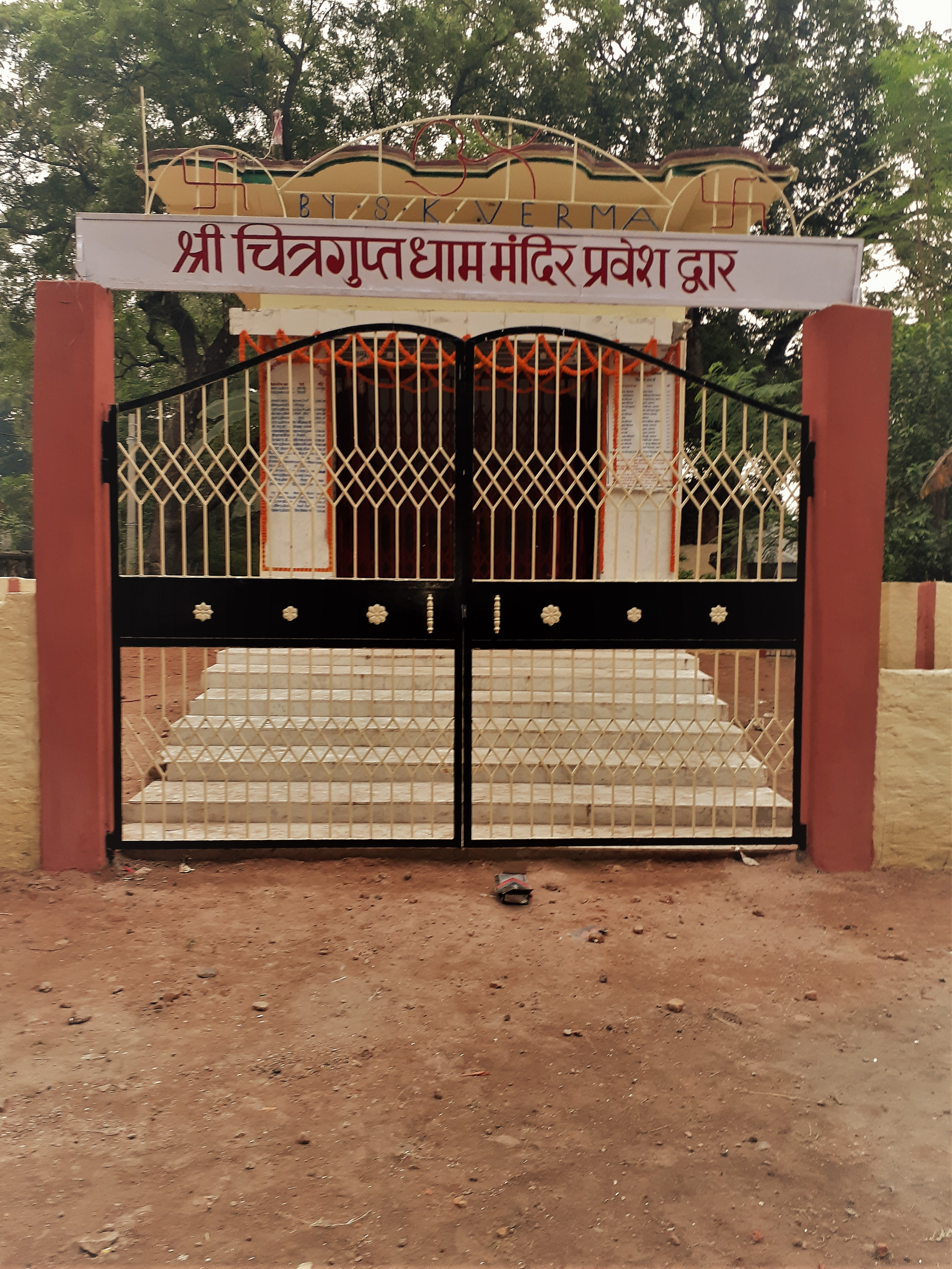
Chitragupt Mandir By Apurv Shrivastva

Chitragupta (Sanskrit: चित्रगुप्त, 'rich in secrets' or 'hidden picture') is a Hindu god assigned with the task of keeping complete records of actions of human beings on the earth and punish or reward them according to their Karmas. He is god of justice therefore known as Dharmaraja. Upon their death, Chitragupta has the task of deciding heaven or the hell for the humans, depending on their actions on the earth. Chitragupta Maharaj is the seventeenth Manasputra of Lord Brahma and thus, allotted the right to write Vedas like Brahmins with the duty of a Kshatriya (Chitragupta is the patron deity of Kayasthas, a Hindu caste of India and Nepal), because of which Chitraguptavanshi Kayasthas are considered as Vedic Suryavanshi Brahmakshatriyas. Chitragupta is god of Kayasth.

Location : Near Busstand , Chitragupt mandir

.........................................................................................................................................................

Nature

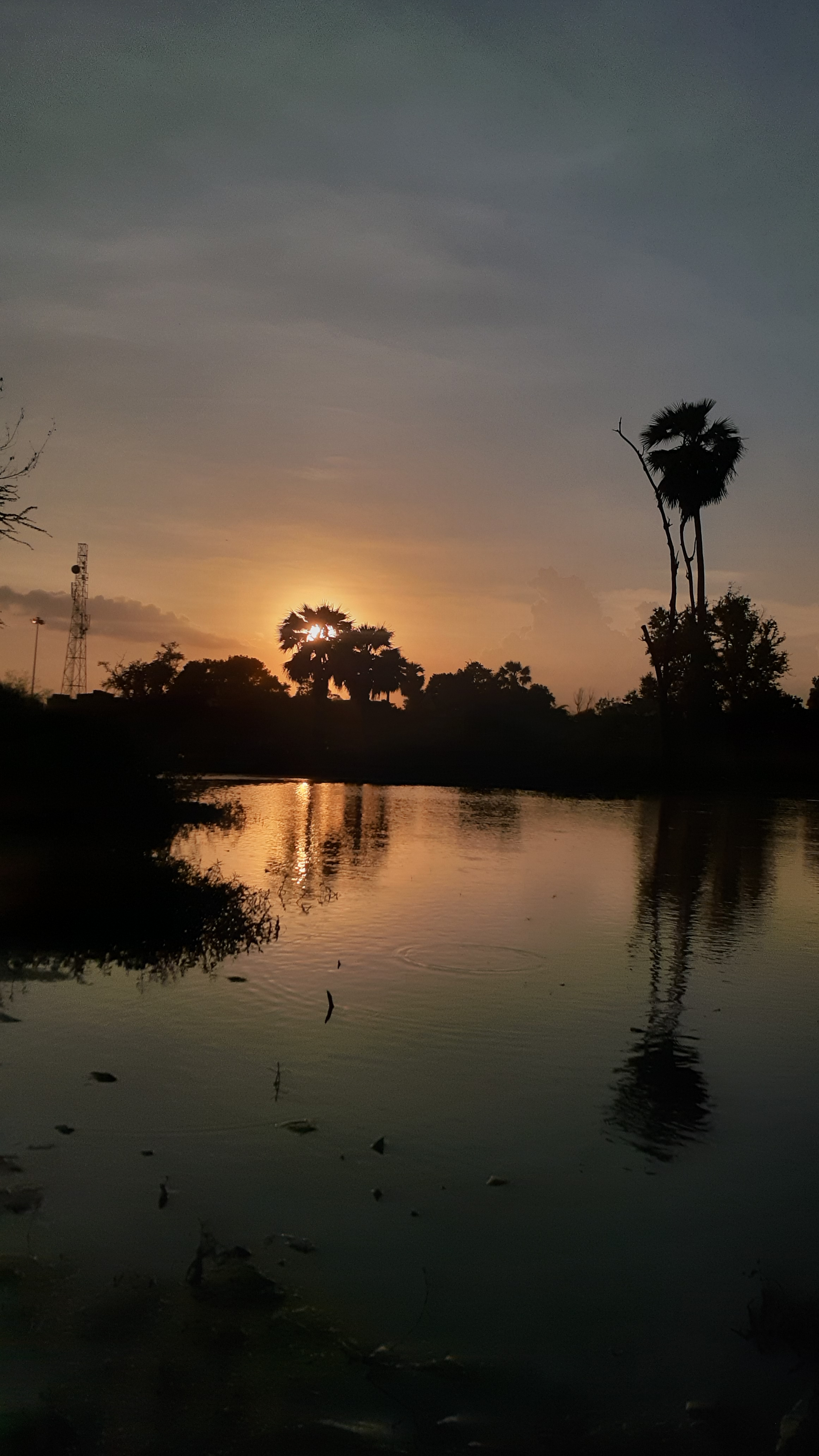
Pc: Apurv

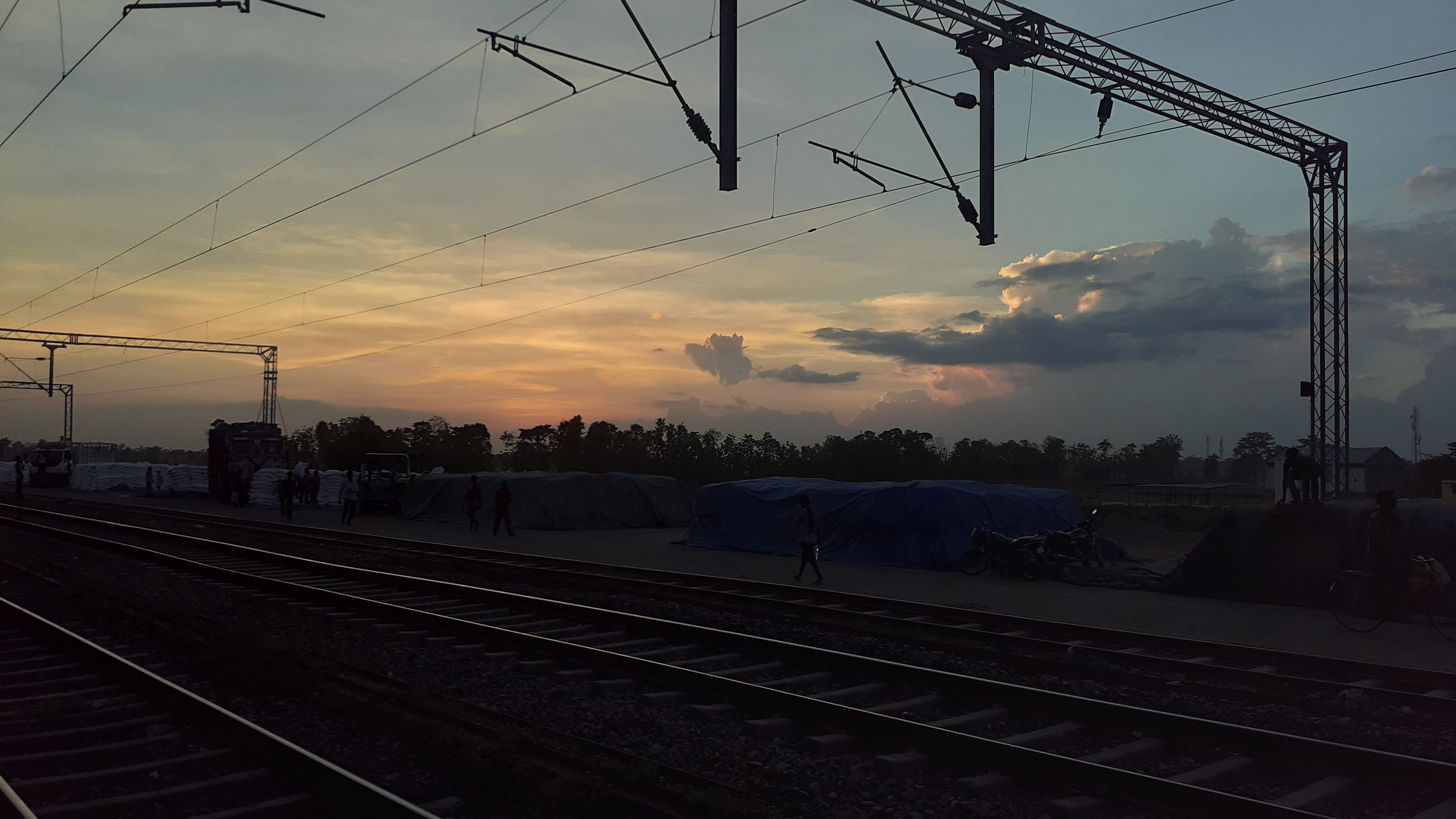

As described above, the nature in Ramnagar is hot in summers and cold in winter like the rest of Bihar.

== Climate ==
The climate of Ramnagar is shown in the chart below. The temperature doesn't remain constant all the year as per chart but follows the climate changes throughout the year Ramnagar weather

Ramnagar

Climate chart (precipitation, max. and min. temperature)
J	F	M	A	M	J	J	A	S	O	N	D
10 23 11	20 26 13	10 33 19	10 39 25	20 42 29	50 40 29	250 34 26	240 32 26	110 34 25	20 34 22	10 30 16	10 25 12
- █ Average max. and min. temperatures in °C
- █ Precipitation totals in mm
- Source: Ramnagar weather
Imperial conversion
J	F	M	A	M	J	J	A	S	O	N	D
0.4 74 51	0.8 79 55	0.4 91 65	0.4 101 77	0.8 108 85	2 103 83	9.8 92 79	9.4 89 79	4.3 94 77	0.8 93 72	0.4 85 60	0.4 77 54
- █ Average max. and min. temperatures in °F
- █ Precipitation totals in inches

Climate data for Ramnagar (A)
Month	Jan	Feb	Mar	Apr	May	Jun	Jul	Aug	Sep	Oct	Nov	Dec	Year
Record high °C (°F)	33.4 (92.1)	37.0 (98.6)	42.7 (108.9)	48.5 (119.3)	48.4 (119.1)	47.3 (117.1)	44.3 (111.7)	41.0 (105.8)	41.0 (105.8)	40.4 (104.7)	38.0 (100.4)	33.2 (91.8)	48.5 (119.3)
Mean daily maximum °C (°F)	23.7 (74.7)	26.9 (80.4)	32.9 (91.2)	38.8 (101.8)	42.1 (107.8)	40.0 (104.0)	34.2 (93.6)	32.0 (89.6)	33.7 (92.7)	34.3 (93.7)	29.9 (85.8)	25.3 (77.5)	32.8 (91.1)
Mean daily minimum °C (°F)	5.9 (42.6)	13.7 (56.7)	19.1 (66.4)	25.0 (77.0)	29.3 (84.7)	29.2 (84.6)	26.5 (79.7)	25.4 (77.7)	25.0 (77.0)	11.8 (53.2)	7.3 (45.1)	6.9 (44.4)	18.8 (65.8)
Record low °C (°F)	1.7 (35.1)	4.5 (40.1)	8.6 (47.5)	14.0 (57.2)	20.0 (68.0)	18.8 (65.8)	20.4 (68.7)	18.4 (65.1)	16.4 (61.5)	14.1 (57.4)	7.1 (44.8)	3.8 (38.8)	1.7 (35.1)
Average precipitation mm (inches)	5.4 (0.21)	4.4 (0.17)	4.0 (0.16)	3.2 (0.13)	10.3 (0.41)	62.9 (2.48)	257.0 (10.12)	245.8 (9.68)	98.5 (3.88)	19.6 (0.77)	7.8 (0.31)	3.5 (0.14)	722.4 (28.46)
Average rainy days	0.9	1.0	0.6	0.4	2.1	6.9	13.1	15.2	5.6	1.6	1.2	0.5	49.1
Average relative humidity (%)	48	38	25	19	23	43	67	74	58	40	41	48	44
Source: Ramnagar weather, India Meteorological Department: (Ramnagar (A) record highs and lows up to 2010), Monthly mean maximum and minimum temperature and rainfall (1961-2000) EDITED by: APURV SHRIVASTVA
