= Mahendra Baitha =

Indian politician (born 1928)

Member of Parliament, Lok Sabha
- In office 1989-2004
- Preceded by: Kailash Baitha
- Succeeded by: Bhola Raut
- Constituency: Bagaha, Bihar

Personal details
- Born: 22 January 1928 Sawnaha, East Champaran district, Bihar, British India
- Party: Janata Dal
- Other political affiliations: Samata Party
- Spouse: Radhika Devi

Mahendra Baitha (born 22 January 1928) was an Indian politician who was elected to the Lower House of Indian Parliament the Lok Sabha from Bagaha, Bihar in 1989 and 1991 as a member of the Janata Dal and in 1996, 1998 and 1999 as a Samata Party (now led by Uday Mandal its President) member.
