= Bagaha =

Town in Bihar, India

- Town
- Location in Bihar, India
- Coordinates: 27.13°N 84.07°E
- Country: India
- State: Bihar
- District: West Champaran

Government
  - Type: Nagar Parishad
  - Body: Bagaha Municipal Council

Area
  - Total: 10.77 km^{2} (4.16 sq mi)
- Elevation: 135 m (443 ft)

Population (2011)
  - Total: 113,012
  - Density: 10,494/km^{2} (27,180/sq mi)

Languages
  - Official: Hindi, Urdu
  - Regional/Spoken: Bhojpuri
- Time zone: UTC+5:30 (IST)
- PIN: 845101
- Telephone code: 06251
- Vehicle registration: BR22
- Sex ratio: 904 ♀/1000 ♂
- Lok Sabha constituency: Valmiki Nagar
- Vidhan Sabha constituency: Bagaha
- Website: westchamparan.bih.nic.in

Bagaha is a city and a municipality in the district of West Champaran in the state of Bihar, India. It is the headquarters of the Bagaha subdivision and also functions as a Police District. The town is situated on the banks of the Gandak River, approximately 64 kilometres (40 mi) northwest of the district headquarters Bettiah, and 294 kilometres (183 mi) from the state capital Patna. It lies close to the Valmiki Tiger Reserve and the India–Nepal border.

== History ==
The region around Bagaha has been part of the ancient kingdom of Mithila and later formed part of the Bettiah Raj, a prominent zamindari estate during British rule. The town grew as a market and administrative centre under the British, eventually becoming a subdivision of West Champaran. The area witnessed the famous Champaran Satyagraha led by Mahatma Gandhi in 1917, though the movement's epicentre was further east. Bagaha was carved out as a separate police district to improve local governance and law enforcement in this forested, border region.

== Geography ==
Bagaha is located at 27.13°N 84.07°E, at an average elevation of 135 metres (443 ft). The town lies on the left bank of the Gandak River, a major tributary of the Ganges. The river's alluvial plains make the surrounding countryside highly fertile, supporting extensive agriculture. The Valmiki Nagar forest and Tiger Reserve stretch to the north, marking the beginning of the Terai ecological zone and the border with Nepal. The climate is humid subtropical, with hot summers, a monsoon season from June to September, and cool winters.

== Demographics ==
As of the 2011 Indian census, Bagaha Nagar Parishad had a population of 113,012. Males constituted 52.5% and females 47.5% of the population. The sex ratio was 904 females per 1,000 males, lower than the national average. The average literacy rate was 62.14%, with male literacy at 70.20% and female literacy at 52.65%.

The religious composition of the town is predominantly Hindu, with a significant Muslim minority. According to the 2011 census, Hindus made up approximately 75% of the population and Muslims around 24%, with small Christian and Sikh communities.

Languages spoken include Hindi, Urdu, and the regional language Bhojpuri.

== Administration ==
Bagaha is a Nagar Parishad (municipal council) divided into several wards. It is the headquarters of the Bagaha subdivision, one of three subdivisions of West Champaran district. The town also functions as a Police District under the Bihar Police, with a Superintendent of Police overseeing local law and order. The Bagaha block is a rural administrative unit surrounding the town.

== Economy ==
The economy of Bagaha is primarily agrarian. The fertile Gandak plains support the cultivation of sugarcane, paddy, wheat, and maize. Several sugar mills operate in the surrounding region, providing employment and driving the local economy. Small-scale industries include rice mills, timber processing, and brick kilns. The town also serves as a trading hub for agricultural produce, particularly sugarcane and bananas. Proximity to the Valmiki Tiger Reserve has led to a growing tourism sector, with visitors generating demand for hotels, restaurants, and guide services.

== Transport ==
=== Railways ===
Bagaha railway station (station code: BUG) lies on the Muzaffarpur–Gorakhpur main line under the Samastipur railway division of the East Central Railway zone. It offers direct connections to Patna, Muzaffarpur, Gorakhpur, and Delhi via several express and passenger trains.

=== Roadways ===
National Highway 727 passes through Bagaha, linking it to Bettiah in the east and Gorakhpur in Uttar Pradesh to the west. State highways connect the town to Patna via Motihari. Through its connection with National Highway 27, Bagaha is also linked to Mehsi. State highways also provide access to the Nepal border at Valmiki Nagar.

=== Airways ===
The nearest airports are Jay Prakash Narayan Airport in Patna (approximately 294 km (183 mi)) and Gorakhpur Airport in Uttar Pradesh (about 110 km (68 mi)). A helipad near Bagaha is occasionally used for official visits.

== Education ==
Bagaha has several government and private schools affiliated with the Bihar School Examination Board and the Central Board of Secondary Education. Prominent institutions include the Government High School, Bagaha, and the D.A.V. Public School. The town also hosts a degree college, Bagaha Degree College, affiliated with Babasaheb Bhimrao Ambedkar Bihar University in Muzaffarpur, offering undergraduate courses in arts, science, and commerce. Literacy programmes and vocational training centres are run by the district administration.

== Tourism ==
Bagaha's chief tourist attraction is the Valmiki Tiger Reserve, located just a few kilometres north of the town. The reserve, which spans over 900 km², is home to tigers, leopards, rhinoceroses, and a rich variety of birdlife. Jungle safaris and nature walks are organised by the forest department. Other nearby places of interest include the Gandak Barrage and the historic Someshwar Fort. The town itself has several temples and mosques, reflecting its mixed religious heritage.

== See also ==
- West Champaran district
- Bettiah
- Gateway of Champaran (Mehsi)
- Valmiki Nagar
