= Ramnagar, Bihar Assembly constituency =

Coordinates: 27°09′46″N 84°19′51″E

Ramnagar
- Constituency No. 2 for the Bihar Legislative Assembly

Constituency details
- Country: India
- Region: East India
- State: Bihar
- District: West Champaran
- Lok Sabha constituency: Valmiki Nagar
- Established: 1962
- Total electors: 299,784
- Reservation: SC

Member of Legislative Assembly
- 18th Bihar Legislative Assembly
- Incumbent Nand Kishor Ram; Diary, Fisheries and Animal Resources Minister of Bihar
- Party: BJP
- Alliance: NDA
- Elected year: 2025

Ramnagar is an assembly constituency in West Champaran district in the Indian state of Bihar. It is reserved for scheduled castes. It was earlier an open seat.

== Overview ==
As per orders of Delimitation of Parliamentary and Assembly constituencies Order, 2008, 2. Ramnagar Assembly constituency (SC) is composed of the following: Ramnagar and Gaunaha community development blocks.

Ramnagar Assembly constituency is part of 1. Valmiki Nagar (Lok Sabha constituency). It was earlier part of Bagaha (Lok Sabha constituency).

== Members of the Legislative Assembly ==
Year	Member	Party
Before 1957: See Bagaha-cum-Ramnagar
1957-62: Constituency did not exist
1962	Narayan Vikram Shah	Swatantra Party
1967	Narayan Vikram Shah	Indian National Congress
1969	Narayan Vikram Shah	Indian National Congress
1972	Narayan Vikram Shah	Indian National Congress (O)
1977	Arjun Vikram Shah	Indian National Congress
1980	Arjun Vikram Shah	Indian National Congress (I)
1985	Arjun Vikram Shah	Indian National Congress
1990	Chandra Mohan Rai	Bharatiya Janata Party
1995	Ram Prasad Yadav	Janata Dal
2000	Chandra Mohan Rai	Bharatiya Janata Party
2005	Chandra Mohan Rai	Bharatiya Janata Party
2005	Chandra Mohan Rai	Bharatiya Janata Party
2010	Bhagirathi Devi	Bharatiya Janata Party
2015	Bhagirathi Devi	Bharatiya Janata Party
2020	Bhagirathi Devi	Bharatiya Janata Party
2025	Nand Kishor Ram	Bharatiya Janata Party

== Election results ==
=== 2025 ===
2025 Bihar Legislative Assembly election: Ramnagar
Party	Candidate	Votes	%	±%
BJP	Nand Kishor Ram	115,214	54.13	+14.56
RJD	Subodh Kumar	79,534	37.36	
JSP	Pappu Kumar Ranjan	6,992	3.28	
BSP	Aaditya Kumar	2,663	1.25	
Independent	Santosh Ram	2,295	1.08	
NOTA	None of the above	2,184	1.03	−1.31
Majority		35,680	16.77	+8.48
Turnout		212,859	71.0	+6.59
BJP hold		Swing		

=== 2020 ===
2020 Bihar Legislative Assembly election: Ramnagar
Party	Candidate	Votes	%	±%
BJP	Bhagirathi Devi	75,423	39.57	−8.48
INC	Rajesh Ram	59,627	31.28	−6.25
Bhartiya Panchyat Party	Subodh Kumar	26,063	13.67	
Fauji Kisan Party	Lorik Das	4,331	2.27	
RLSP	Lokesh Ram	4,051	2.13	
Independent	Ramayan Paswan	3,793	1.99	
Janta Dal Rashtravadi	Vinay Ram	3,215	1.69	
Independent	Awadh Kishor Ram	3,111	1.63	
Independent	Ayush Kumar	2,671	1.4	
Independent	Ramnaresh Baitha	2,460	1.29	
NOTA	None of the above	4,456	2.34	+0.47
Majority		15,796	8.29	−2.23
Turnout		190,613	64.41	−1.02
BJP hold		Swing		

=== 2015 ===
2015 Bihar Legislative Assembly election: Ramnagar
Party	Candidate	Votes	%	±%
BJP	Bhagirathi Devi	82,166	48.05	
INC	Purnmasi Ram	64,178	37.53	
NCP	Subodh Kumar	9,488	5.55	
CPI(ML)L	Ramkeshwar Ram	3,158	1.85	
Independent	Manjay Lal Satyam	2,769	1.62	
BSP	Naresh Ram	2,531	1.48	
NOTA	None of the above	3,195	1.87	
Majority		17,988	10.52	
Turnout		170,997	65.43	
BJP hold		Swing		

=== 2010 ===
2010 Bihar Legislative Assembly election: Ramnagar
Party	Candidate	Votes	%	±%
BJP	Bhagirathi Devi	51,993	41.51	
INC	Naresh Ram	22,211	17.73	
NCP	Subodh Kumar	20,095	16.04	
RJD	Shambhu Ram	9080	7.25	
CPI(ML)L	Rameshvar Manjhee	4129	3.30	
BSP	Lakshmi Ram	3825	3.05	
Independent	Vijay Paswan	2048	1.64	
SP	Hiralal Ram	1863	1.49	
SJP(R)	Sankar Ram	1600	1.28	
Independent	Suchindra Ram	1497	1.20	
Independent	Parsottam Ram	1208	0.96	
Independent	Mansa Bharti	1083	0.86	
BVM	Sahodari Devi	1038	0.83	
Independent	Kanchan Baitha	999	0.80	
SBSP	Ramraj Paswan	992	0.79	
Independent	Nathu Ravi	900	0.72	
ABAS	Uday Raram	696	0.56	
Majority		29,782	23.78	
Turnout		1,25,257	57.83	
BJP hold		Swing		
