= Bhagirathi Devi =

Indian politician

Member of Bihar Legislative Assembly
- In office 2010–2025
- Preceded by: Chandra Mohan Rai
- Succeeded by: Nand Kishor Ram
- Constituency: Ramnagar
- In office 2000–2010
- Preceded by: Bhola Ram Toofani
- Succeeded by: Constituency defunct
- Constituency: Shikarpur

Personal details
- Born: 12 January 1954 (age 72) Narkatiaganj, West Champaran district, Bihar
- Party: Bharatiya Janata Party
- Spouse: Mamikhan Raut
- Children: 6
- Occupation: Politician; Social worker

Bhagirathi Devi (born 12 January 1954) is an Indian politician. She was a member of the Bihar Legislative Assembly, and represented Ramnagar, Paschim Champaran. Bhagirathi Devi initially worked as a sweeper in the block development office in Narkatiyaganj, West Champaran district with ₹800 (US$8.30) as salary.

She hails from a Mahadalit family from Narkatiaganj in Bihar. Bhagirathi again contested from Ramnagar assembly seat in 2015 Bihar Legislative Assembly election against Congress candidate and won the seat. In April 2015, Bhagirathi Devi fought with Annu Shukla of ruling Janata Dal (United) during the Zero Hour in Bihar Legislative Assembly over the issue of non-payment of wage under MGNREGA scheme. Bhagirathi Devi initially won elections from now-defunct Shikarpur (Vidhan Sabha constituency) in 2000 and 2005. She is married to a railway employee, Mamikhan Raut.

== Award ==
In 2019, she was honoured with the Padma Shri Award.

== Social work ==
Bhagirathi allowed the Anganwadi Kendra (child care centres) to open its office in her house in West Champaran district. She especially worked in the field of girls’ education. Bhagirathi spent several years creating mahila sangathans (women's groups) in Narkatiyaganj block, organising women and creating awareness around issues that included domestic violence, violence against dalits and fair wages. She later expanded her political activism to other blocks in the district, going to jail in 1991 for organising demonstrations.

== See also ==
- Jitan Ram Manjhi
- Manoj Bajpai
