= Raghaw Sharan Pandey =

Indian politician and civil servant

R. S. Pandey

MLA of Bihar Legislative Assembly
- In office 2015–2020
- Preceded by: Prabhat Ranjan Singh
- Succeeded by: Ram Singh
- Constituency: Bagaha

Chief Secretary, Government of Nagaland
- In office 2000–2004

Secretary, Union Ministry of Petroleum and Natural Gas
- In office 2008–2010

Interlocutor, Naga Peace Talks
- In office 2010–2013

Founder of Valmiki Vikas Manch
- In office 2015–incumbent

Personal details
- Born: 15 January 1950 (age 76) Champaran, Bihar
- Party: Bharatiya Janata Party
- Spouse: Raka Pandey
- Education: Patna University
- Occupation: Social Worker, Politician

R. S. Pandey is a politician and a former Indian Administrative Service officer (batch of 1972 and retired in 2010). He was a member of the Bharatiya Janata Party (BJP) from December 2013 - October 2019, and a special invitee member of the BJP National Executive since March 2015. He has been a senior bureaucrat having held key positions across central and Nagaland state government administration.

R. S. Pandey has been Secretary, Ministry of Parliamentary Affairs, Secretary, Ministry of Steel, and Secretary, Ministry of Petroleum and Natural Gas in Government of India. He also held the position of Chief Secretary, Government of Nagaland. After retirement on 31.1.2010, he was appointed, in February 2010 by the Government of India as the Interlocutor and Government of India Representative for Naga Peace Talks (2010-2013).

He is also the founder, chairperson and managing trustee of Valmiki Vikas Manch (VVM), an NGO which he founded in 2015 with the purpose of furthering socio-economic development particularly in the Champaran region in "Bihar".

== Early life and career ==
Born to humble beginnings in a small village in Champaran district of Bihar in a Brahmin family on 15 January 1950, R. S. Pandey had a brilliant academic career. He went to college in MJK college, Bettiah; followed by Science College, Patna, and topped in several university examinations. In 1972, Mr. Pandey was selected to the Indian Administrative Service, and allotted the Nagaland Cadre where he spent the early part of his career, thus starting a long association with the North East.

== Assignments and positions ==
- Director, National Institute for the Orthopedically Handicapped (1986 – 1987)
- Director, Ali Yavar Jung National Institute for Hearing Handicapped (1987 - 1988)
- Director, Union Ministry of Welfare (Handicapped Welfare Division) (1986 – 1990)
- Joint Secretary, Ministry of Welfare, Government of India (1990 – 1991)
- Resident Commissioner Government of Nagaland, New Delhi (1991-1994)
- Secretary, National Council of Educational Research and Training (NCERT) ( 1994 – 1995)
- National Program Director, District Primary Education Program (DPEP) – a program supported by various multilateral and bilateral agencies (World Bank, European Commission, UNICEF, DFID) (1995-1999)
- Joint Secretary, Department of Education, Ministry of Human Resource Development, Government of India (1995- 1999)
- Joint Secretary (Additional charge), Secondary Education and UNESCO division, for a period of one year (1996)
- Additional Chief Secretary and Development Commissioner, Government of Nagaland, India (1999 –2000)
- Chief Secretary, Government of Nagaland (2000 - 2004)
- Additional Secretary, Ministry of Agriculture, Government of India (2004-2006)
- Secretary, Ministry of Parliamentary Affairs, Government of India (2006)
- Secretary, Ministry of Steel, Government of India (2006-2008)
- Advisor to Governor of Nagaland (2008)
- Secretary, Ministry of Petroleum and Natural Gas Government of India (2008-2010)
- Interlocutor, (Govt. of India Representative for Naga Peace Talks) (2010-2013)

== Education ==
R. S. Pandey was in charge of District Primary Education Program (DPEP) which was funded by multilateral and bilateral agencies, namely, the World Bank, the European Commission, DFID, and UNICEF. In 1997, the World Bank President singled out DPEP as one program which had done exceptionally well and could serve as a model for other countries. The successful implementation of the program under R.S Pandey, later led to its being upgraded into the Sarva Shiksha Abhiyan, a flagship program for universalizing Elementary Education in India.

R. S. Pandey held an additional charge of Commissioner, Central School Organization, which is a national organization managing over a thousand Secondary and Senior Secondary schools across the country, for a period of six months (1998).

== Chief Secretary, State of Nagaland ==
As the Chief Secretary, R. S. Pandey initiated various reform measures including the law and order reform, financial sector reform and institutional reform to improve delivery and effectiveness of governmental programs (through enactment of Nagaland Communitization of Public Institutions and Services Act, 2002).

== Communitization ==
During his tenure as Chief Secretary, Nagaland, R.S. Pandey was instrumental in conceptualizing an implementing a new form of governance, referred to as Communitisation. Communitisation dealt with the improvement of publicly delivered services such as education, health, electricity etc. These reform measures led to significant improvements in service delivery including increase in power tariff collections, quality of health centres and fall in number of drop-outs from communitized elementary School. It was publicly lauded by the then Prime Minister Shri Atal Behari Vajpayee. R. S. Pandey also received various awards for this initiative.

== Petroleum Ministry and The Energy Sector ==
R. S. Pandey was appointed the Union Secretary in the Ministry of Petroleum and Natural Gas at a very crucial time. Crude oil prices were at an all-time high of $140 per barrel, with very critical implications on India’s energy security. His tenure saw India successfully work its way through its energy needs in this critical period. There was also a breakthrough in domestic oil and gas production during his tenure. The oil PSU strike was also witnessed during this period, and its firm handling won much praise for the Government.

== Naga Peace Talks ==
Owing to his long experience with the North East, R. S. Pandey was charged with the responsibility of progressing a largely stalled negotiation with the NSCN(IM) (Nationalist Socialist Council of Nagaland (Issac Muivah). This was a very fruitful period of the talks, wherein a common agenda was drawn up and most key points were agreed upon.

== Political career ==
In November 2015, he was elected as Member of Legislative Assembly, on a BJP party ticket, from the Bagaha assemble constituency in West Champaran district in Bihar.

In 2020, he has been denied the opportunity by BJP for 'renomination', for, he alleged, "there had been a conspiracy against me by some businessmen and contractors whose interests were affected adversely in the last five years. I had disallowed middlemen in the development projects and liquidated their involvement in the delivery system to the tribals.” He told Free Press Journal: "It is for the people to decide, but I will definitely contest. I cannot leave my voters in the lurch.”

== Awards and recognition ==
- R. S. Pandey was felicitated with the top civil service award – the Prime Minister’s Awards for Excellence in Public Administration in 2007.
- He also received the United Nations Public Service Awards in 2008 at the UN Headquarters, New York City.

== Books authored ==
- Primary Education Reform (published By the World Bank), 1991
- Perspectives in Disability and Rehabilitation, 1994
- Communitization: The Third Way of Governance, 2010
