= Abhishek Ranjan =

Indian politician

Member of Bihar Legislative Assembly
- Incumbent
- Assumed office 2025
- Preceded by: Umakant Singh
- Constituency: Chanpatia

Personal details
- Party: Indian National Congress

Abhishek Ranjan is an Indian politician from Indian National Congress and a member of Bihar Legislative Assembly from Chanpatia Assembly constituency he won this seat with a slight margin of 602 votes he is also a big land lord.
