= Jagannath Prasad Swatantra =

Indian politician

Member of Parliament, Lok Sabha
- In office 1977–1980
- Preceded by: Bhola Raut
- Succeeded by: Bhola Raut
- Constituency: Bagaha, Bihar

Personal details
- Born: June 1921 (age 104) Bettiah, West Champaran District, Bihar, British India
- Party: Janata party
- Spouse: Tejvati Dev

Jagannath Prasad Swatantra is an Indian politician. He was elected to the Lok Sabha, the lower house of the Parliament of India from Bagaha in Bihar as a member of the Janata party.
