= Chanpatia Assembly constituency =

Vidhan Sabha constituency in India

Coordinates: 26°56′44″N 84°33′09″E

Chanpatia
- Constituency No. 7 for the Bihar Legislative Assembly

Constituency details
- Country: India
- Region: East India
- State: Bihar
- District: Paschim Champaran
- Lok Sabha constituency: 2. Paschim Champaran
- Established: 1957
- Total electors: 294,526
- Reservation: None

Member of Legislative Assembly
- 18th Bihar Legislative Assembly
- Incumbent Abhishek Ranjan
- Party: INC
- Alliance: MGB
- Elected year: 2025

Chanpatia Assembly constituency is an assembly constituency in Paschim Champaran district in the Indian state of Bihar.

== Overview ==
As per orders of Delimitation of Parliamentary and Assembly constituencies Order, 2008, 7. Chanpatia Assembly constituency is composed of the following: Chanpatia community development block; and Chanayan Bandh, Mahana Gani, Ratanmala, Sarisawa, Barawa Semaraghat, Harpur Garawa, Dumari, Mahanwa Rampurwa, Dhokarahan, Baithania Bhanachak and Nautan Khurd gram panchayats of Majhaulia CD Block.

Chanpatia Assembly constituency is part of 2. Paschim Champaran (Lok Sabha constituency). It was earlier part of Bettiah (Lok Sabha constituency).

== Members of the Legislative Assembly ==
Year	Name	Party
1957	Ketaki Devi	Indian National Congress
1962	Pramod Kumar Mishra	Indian National Congress
1967	Pramod Kumar Mishra	Indian National Congress
1969	Vir Singh	Samyukta Socialist Party
1972	Umesh Prasad Verma	Indian National Congress
1977	Vir Singh	Janata Party
1980	Birbal Sharma	Communist Party of India
1985	Birbal Sharma	Communist Party of India
1990	Krishna Kumar Mishra	Janata Dal
1995	Birbal Sharma	Communist Party of India
2000	Krishna Kumar Mishra	Bharatiya Janata Party
2005	Satish Chandra Dubey	Bharatiya Janata Party
2005	Satish Chandra Dubey	Bharatiya Janata Party
2010	Chandra Mohan Rai	Bharatiya Janata Party
2015	Prakash Rai	Bharatiya Janata Party
2020	Umakant Singh	Bharatiya Janata Party
2025	Abhishek Ranjan	Indian National Congress

== Election results ==
=== 2025 ===
Bihar Assembly election, 2025: Chanpatia
Party	Candidate	Votes	%	±%
INC	Abhishek Ranjan	87,538	40.07	+0.04
BJP	Umakant Singh	86,936	39.8	−7.89
JSP	Manish Kashyap	37,172	17.02	
Loktantrik Jan Swaraj Party	Bipin Nath Tiwari	2,108	0.96	
Independent	Mohammad Soaib	2,092	0.96	
NOTA	None of the above	2,609	1.19	−0.47
Majority		602	0.27	−7.39
Turnout		218,455	74.17	+10.35
INC gain from BJP				

=== 2020 ===
Bihar Assembly election, 2020: Chanpatia
Party	Candidate	Votes	%	±%
BJP	Umakant Singh	83,828	47.69	▲8.65
INC	Abhishek Ranjan	70,359	40.03	
Independent	Manish Kashyap	9,239	5.26	
RLSP	Santosh Kumar Gupta	3,526	2.01	
NOTA	None of the above	2,910	1.66	▼1.21
Majority		13,469	7.66	▲7.36
Turnout		175,774	63.82	▲0.01
BJP hold				

=== 2015 ===
2015 Bihar Legislative Assembly election: Chanpatia
Party	Candidate	Votes	%	±%
BJP	Prakash Rai	61,304	39.04	
JD(U)	N. N. Sahi	60,840	38.74	
CPI	Om Prakash Kranti	10,136	6.45	
Independent	Manish Kumar Prasad	6,446	4.11	
Independent	Basant Singh	5,254	3.35	
BSP	Mohammad Jahangir	2,546	1.62	
SP	Mukti Nath Upadhyaya	2,523	1.61	
NOTA	None of the above	4,506	2.87	
Majority		464	0.3	
Turnout		157,027	63.81	
BJP hold		Swing		

=== 2010 ===
2010 Bihar Legislative Assembly election: Chanpatia
Party	Candidate	Votes	%	±%
BJP	Chandra Mohan Rai	44,835	40.41	
BSP	Ejaj Hussain	21,423	19.31	
INC	Tribhuvan Prasad Sharma	9,131	8.23	
LJP	Sheikh Sharifuddin	7,623	6.87	
CPI	Om Prakash Srivastava	7,441	6.71	
Independent	Veer Mahto	4,934	4.45	
Majority		23,412	21.1	
Turnout		1,10,954	55.77	
BJP hold		Swing		
