= Ram Singh (politician) =

Indian politician

Member of Bihar Legislative Assembly
- Incumbent
- Assumed office 2020
- Preceded by: Raghaw Sharan Pandey
- Constituency: Bagaha

Personal details
- Born: 12 August 1955 (age 70)
- Party: Bharatiya Janata Party

Ram Singh is an Indian politician belonging to Bharatiya Janata Party. He was elected as a member of Bihar Legislative Assembly from Bagaha in 2025 Bihar Legislative Assembly election and 2020 Bihar Legislative Assembly election replacing Raghaw Sharan Pandey former IAS officer who won the seat in 2015 election.
