= Surendra Prasad Kushwaha =

Indian politician

Member of Bihar Legislative Assembly
- Incumbent
- Assumed office 2025
- Preceded by: Dhirendra Pratap Singh
- Constituency: Valmiki Nagar

Personal details
- Party: Indian National Congress

Surendra Prasad Kushwaha is an Indian politician from Indian National Congress and a member of Bihar Legislative Assembly from Valmiki Nagar Assembly constituency seat.
