= Nand Kishor Ram =

Indian politician

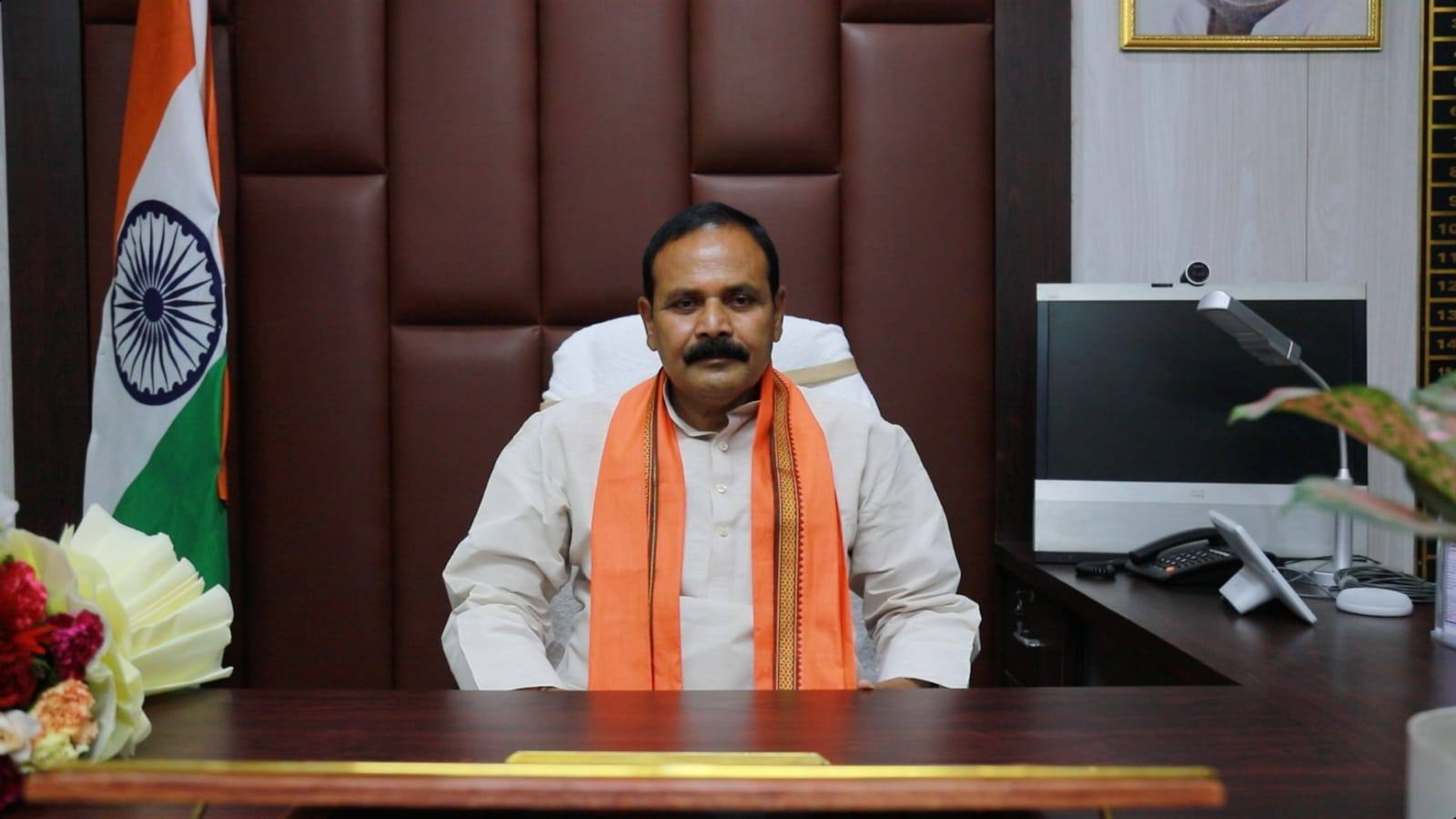
- Ram in 2026

Cabinet Minister Government of Bihar
- Incumbent
- Assumed office 07 May 2026
- Chief Minister: Samrat Choudhary
- Governor: Syed Ata Hasnain
- Ministry & Departments: Dairy, Fisheries and Animal Resources
- Preceded by: Samrat Choudhary

Member of Bihar Legislative Assembly
- Incumbent
- Assumed office 14 November 2025
- Constituency: Ramnagar
- Preceded by: Bhagirathi Devi

Personal details
- Born: Nand Kishor Ram; February 10, 1973 (age 53) Champaran, Bihar, India
- Party: Bharatiya Janata Party
- Education: Babasaheb Bhimrao Ambedkar Bihar University (BA)
- Occupation: Politician

Nand Kishor Ram is an Indian politician from Bharatiya Janata Party. He was elected member of Bihar Legislative Assembly from Ramnagar assembly constituency seat in the 2025 Bihar election. He is currently serving as the Dairy, Fisheries and Animal Resources Minister of Bihar.

== Political career ==
Nand Kishor Ram contested the Bihar general assembly election in 2025 from Bhartiya Janata party and won the election from Ramnagar constituency with a big margin and took the oath as cabinet minister in Samrat Choudhary ministry.

== Early life & Education ==
Ram was born in Champaran, Bihar and did his graduation in Bachelor of Arts from Baba Bhimrao Ambedkar Bihar University. Since childhood he is interested in politics and involved in active politics after college life.

== Positions held ==
1. Member of Bihar Legislative Assembly (2025–Present)
2. Cabinet Minister of Dairy, Fisheries and Animal Resources in Bihar Government (2026–Present)
