= Someshwar Fort =

Historic fortress in Darbhanga, India

- Interactive map of Someshwar Fort
- 27.388057°N 84.304914°E
- Location: West Champaran, India

History
- Built: 1934-1947

Site notes
- Height: ~880 metres

Someshwar Fort is the highest peak in Bihar, India. It is a part of the Someshwar Range, and is situated in the district of West Champaran. It has an elevation about 880 metres (2,890 ft). The fort itself is a ruin.
