= Baidyanath Prasad Mahto =

Indian politician (1947–2020)

Former Deputy-Leader of Janata Dal (United) in Lok Sabha
- In office 23 May 2019 – 28 February 2020
- President: Ram Nath Kovind
- Prime Minister: Narendra Modi
- Vice President: Venkaiah Naidu
- Preceded by: Satish Chandra Dubey
- Succeeded by: Sunil Kumar

Ministry of Rural Development Department Bihar Government
- In office October 2005 – August 2008
- Chief Minister: Nitish Kumar

Member, Committee of chemical and fertilizer Indian Government
- In office August 2009 – May 2014
- Prime Minister: Manmohan Singh

Member, Committee of papers Laid on Tables Indian Government
- In office September 2009 – May 2014
- Prime Minister: Manmohan Singh

Member, Committee of Rural Development Indian Government
- In office 18 August 2019 – 28 February 2020
- Prime Minister: Narendra Modi

Member of Parliament, Lok Sabha
- In office 2019 – 28 February 2020
- Preceded by: Satish Chandra Dubey
- Constituency: Valmiki Nagar
- In office 2009–2014
- Preceded by: constituency established
- Succeeded by: Satish Chandra Dubey
- Constituency: Valmiki Nagar

Personal details
- Born: 2 June 1947 pakadiya, bahoranpur, panchayat-pakadiya, Block- Nautan, West Champaran, India
- Died: 28 February 2020 (aged 72) New Delhi
- Party: Janata Dal (United)
- Spouse: Sudama Devi
- Children: 4 (Sunil Kumar, Manoj Kumar, Rajesh Kumar and Sunita Bharti)
- Occupation: Politician

Baidyanath Prasad Mahto (2 June 1947 – 28 February 2020) was an Indian Politician and a Member of Indian Parliament to the 15th and 17th Lok Sabha. He won the 2009 and 2019 Indian general election from Valmiki Nagar constituency being a Janata Dal (United) candidate. He was earlier elected three times to the Bihar Legislative Assembly from Nautan. He was also Minister of Rural Development Department From 2005 to 2008 in Bihar Government.

== Life ==
Baidyanath Prasad Mahto was Branch Manager, in National Co-operative Bank, Bettiah (Bihar) in the years 1992-95 and after that he resigned from bank manager post and became active in party politics. He also fought and lost MLA election in 1995 as Samata Party candidate and finished with second position from Nautan. After that he contested elections again in 2000 as Samata Party candidate and won from Nautan (Vidhan Sabha constituency). Following the death of Baidyanath Prasad Mahto without completing his term as Member of Parliament, his son Sunil Kumar won the By-election conducted to fill the vacancy on Valmikinagar seat in 2020 on Janata Dal (United) ticket. He defeated Pravesh Kumar Mishra of Congress.

== Political career ==
- 1995: SAP Candidate From Nautan (lost, 2nd Position)
- 2000: SAP Candidate From Nautan (Won First Time as MLA)
- 2005 (February and October): JDU Candidate From Nautan (Won 2nd and 3rd Time as MLA)
- 2005–2008: Rural Development Minister, Bihar
- 2009–2014: MP Valmikinagar as JDU Candidate
- Chief Whip (Jdu Lok Sabha) MP Valmikinagar
- Member, Committee on Chemicals and Fertilizers
- Member, Committee on Papers Laid on Table
- 2014: Lost MP election
- 2019: Deputy leader of Janata Dal (United) in Lok Sabha, MP from Valmiki Nagar (Lok Sabha constituency) and Member of Rural Department

Lok Sabha
Preceded by Constituency did not exist	Member of Parliament for Valmiki Nagar; 2009 – 2014	Succeeded by Satish Chandra Dubey
Preceded by Satish Chandra Dubey	Member of Parliament for Valmiki Nagar; 2019 – 2020	Succeeded by Sunil Kumar
