= Narkatiaganj Assembly constituency =

Vidhan Sabha Constituency in Bihar, India

Coordinates: 27°06′20″N 84°27′57″E

Narkatiaganj
- Constituency No. 3 for the Bihar Legislative Assembly

Constituency details
- Country: India
- Region: East India
- State: Bihar
- District: West Champaran
- Lok Sabha constituency: 1. Valmiki Nagar
- Established: 2008
- Total electors: 277,575
- Reservation: None

Member of Legislative Assembly
- 18th Bihar Legislative Assembly
- Incumbent Sanjay Kumar Pandey
- Party: BJP
- Alliance: NDA
- Elected year: 2025
- Preceded by: Rashmi Varma

Narkatiaganj Assembly constituency is an assembly constituency in West Champaran district in the Indian state of Bihar.

== Overview ==
As per orders of Delimitation of Parliamentary and Assembly constituencies Order, 2008, 3. Narkatiaganj Assembly constituency is composed of the following: Dhumnagar, Shikarpur, Hardi Tedha, Malda Maldi, Semari, Manwa Parsi, Chamua, Nautanwa, Dumaria, Binawalia, Maldahiya Pokhariya, Kehunia Roari, Parorahan, Purainia Harsari, Rajpur Tumkaria, Sugauli, Kundilpur, Bheriharwa, Gokhula, Kesharia, Kukura, Serahwa, Rakahi Champapur, Banwaria, Bhasurari gram panchayats and Narkatiaganj notified area of Narkatiganj community development block; Telpur, Deurawa, Bagahi Basawaria, Dhobini, Gonauli Dumra and Lakar Sisai gram panchayats of Lauriya CD Block.

Narkatiaganj Assembly constituency is part of 1. Valmiki Nagar Lok Sabha constituency.

== Members of the Legislative Assembly ==
Year	Member	Party
Until 2008: Constituency did not exist
2010	Satish Chandra Dubey	Bharatiya Janata Party
2014^	Rashmi Varma	Bharatiya Janata Party
2015	Vinay Varma	Indian National Congress
2020	Rashmi Varma	Bharatiya Janata Party
2025	Sanjay Kumar Pandey	Bharatiya Janata Party

^by-election

== Election results ==
=== 2025 ===
2025 Bihar Legislative Assembly election: Narkatiaganj
Party	Candidate	Votes	%	±%
BJP	Sanjay Kumar Pandey	100,044	50.86	+5.01
RJD	Deepak Yadav	73,586	37.41	
INC	Shaswat Kedar	5,388	2.74	−30.28
JSP	Md Wasiullah	4,238	2.15	
Independent	Ishteyak Ahamad	3,831	1.95	
Independent	Maya Devi	2,337	1.19	
NOTA	None of the above	2,203	1.12	+0.12
Majority		26,458	13.45	+0.62
Turnout		196,691	70.86	+8.87
BJP hold		Swing		

=== 2020 ===
Bihar Assembly election, 2020: Narkatiaganj
Party	Candidate	Votes	%	±%
BJP	Rashmi Varma	75,484	45.85	▲19.05
INC	Vinay Varma	54,350	33.02	▼4.23
Independent	Renu Devi	7,674	4.66	
LJP	Naushad Alam	5,408	3.29	
RLSP	Manjeet Kumar Verma	2,913	1.77	
Independent	Nathu Ravi	2,051	1.25	
Independent	Bablu Kumar Gupta	1,805	1.1	
NOTA	None of the above	1,647	1.0	▲0.52
Majority		21,134	12.83	▲2.38
Turnout		164,615	61.99	▼1.2
BJP gain from INC		Swing		

=== 2015 ===
2015 Bihar Legislative Assembly election: Narkatiaganj
Party	Candidate	Votes	%	±%
INC	Vinay Varma	57,212	37.25	
BJP	Renu Devi	41,151	26.8	
Independent	Rashmi Verma	39,200	25.53	
Independent	Rambhaju Mahato	2,262	1.47	
BSP	Naushad Alam	2,124	1.38	
Independent	Shailesh Mishra	1,666	1.08	
SS	Prem Narayan Ojha	1,431	0.93	
NOTA	None of the above	740	0.48	
Majority		16,061	10.45	
Turnout		153,571	63.19	
INC gain from BJP		Swing		

=== 2014 bypoll ===
By-elections, 2014: Narkatiaganj
Party	Candidate	Votes	%	±%
BJP	Rashmi Verma	64602		
INC	Fakhruddin Khan	48860		
JPS	Rambhaju Mahato	3769		
Independent	Manjubala Pathak	3694		
CPI(ML)L	Mukhtar Miya	1846		
none of the above	NOTA	1514		
Independent	Bhot Chaturvedi	1425		
Independent	Niranjan Mishra	1137		
Independent	Naushad Alam	1133		
Independent	Anand Singh	673		
Independent	Jahid Hussain	528		
Majority		15,742		
Turnout		1,27,667		
BJP hold		Swing		

=== 2010 ===
2010 Bihar Legislative Assembly election: Narkatiaganj
Party	Candidate	Votes	%	±%
BJP	Satish Chandra Dubey	45,022	38.06	
INC	Alok Prasad Verma	24,794	20.96	
Independent	Fakhruddin Khan	22,381	18.92	
RJD	Majhar Alam	8243	6.97	
BSP	Nurul Hoda Shah	4680	3.96	
Independent	Krishna Kumar Mishra	3980	3.36	
NCP	Jainul Haque	1642	1.39	
Independent	Panchdeo Chaubey	1475	1.25	
SP	Asima Khatoon	1300	1.10	
SJP(R)	Manoj Patel	1238	1.05	
Independent	Om Shanti Baba	923	0.78	
Independent	Nand Lal Ram	817	0.69	
IJP	Baidhnath Chaubey	706	0.60	
ABAS	Shekh Hasmuddin	635	0.54	
RKJP	Iftekhar Ahmad	446	0.38	
Majority		20,228	17.1	
Turnout		1,18,282	59.37	
BJP win (new seat)				
