= Sanjay Kumar Pandey =

Indian politician

Member of Bihar Legislative Assembly
- Incumbent
- Assumed office 2025
- Preceded by: Rashmi Varma
- Constituency: Narkatiaganj

Personal details
- Political party: Bharatiya Janata Party

Sanjay Kumar Pandey is an Indian politician and a member of Bihar Legislative Assembly from the Narkatiaganj Assembly constituency seat.
