= Chandra Mohan Rai =

Indian politician

Cabinet Minister Government of Bihar
- In office 26 November 2010 – 16 June 2013
- Ministry: Term
- Minister of Public Health Engineering Department: 26 November 2010 - 16 June 2013
- In office 24 November 2005 – 13 April 2008
- Ministry: Term
- Minister of Health & Family Welfare: 24 November 2005 - 13 April 2008

Member of Bihar Legislative Assembly
- In office 2010–2015
- Preceded by: Satish Chandra Dubey
- Succeeded by: Prakash Rai
- Constituency: Chanpatia
- In office 2000–2010
- Preceded by: Ram Prasad Yadav
- Succeeded by: Bhagirathi Devi
- Constituency: Ramnagar
- In office 1990–1995
- Preceded by: Arjun Vikram Shah
- Succeeded by: Ram Prasad Yadav
- Constituency: Ramnagar

Personal details
- Party: Bharatiya Janata Party

Chandra Mohan Rai is an Indian politician from Bihar and a member of the Bharatiya Janata Party. He served as a member of the Bihar Legislative Assembly from the Ramnagar Assembly constituency and later from the Chanpatia Assembly constituency. He served as a minister in the Government of Bihar, holding the Health and Public Health Engineering Department portfolios in the Nitish Kumar government between 2005 and 2013.

Rai contested his first election in 1967 as a Jan Sangh candidate. In 1977, he contested the Ramnagar constituency as a Janata Party candidate but lost to Arjun Vikram Shah. He was elected from Ramnagar as a BJP candidate in 1990. Rai subsequently served as a minister in the Bihar government led by Nitish Kumar. In 2015, he resigned from his positions in the BJP.
