= Valmiki Nagar Assembly constituency =

Coordinates: 27°16′23″N 84°04′32″E

Valmiki Nagar
- Constituency No. 1 for the Bihar Legislative Assembly

Constituency details
- Country: India
- Region: East India
- State: Bihar
- Division: Tirhut
- District: West Champaran
- Lok Sabha constituency: Valmiki Nagar
- Established: 2008
- Total electors: 331,447
- Reservation: None

Member of Legislative Assembly
- 18th Bihar Legislative Assembly
- Incumbent Surendra Prasad Kushwaha
- Party: INC
- Alliance: MGB
- Elected year: 2025
- Preceded by: Dhirendra Pratap Singh

Valmiki Nagar Assembly constituency is an assembly constituency in West Champaran district in the Indian state of Bihar. Surendra Prasasd Kushwaha of INC is the incumbent MLA.

== Overview ==
As per orders of Delimitation of Parliamentary and Assembly constituencies Order, 2008, No. 1 Valmiki Nagar Assembly constituency is composed of the following: Piprasi, Madhubani, Thakrahan and Bhitaha community development blocks; and Valmiki Nagar, Laxmipur Rampurwa, Santpur Soharia, Champapur Gonauli, Naurangia Dardari, Mahuawa Katharawa, Harnatand, Balua Chhatraul, Dewaria Taruanwa, Bharachhi, Belahawa Madanpur, Bakuli Panchgwa, Binwalia Bodhser, Nayagaon Rampur, Mangalpur Ausani, Borawal Narawal, Semra Katkuiya, Yamunapur Tadwalia, Jimari Nautanawa and Dholbajwa Laxmipur gram panchayats of Sidhaw CD Block.

Valmiki Nagar Assembly constituency is part of No. 1 Valmiki Nagar (Lok Sabha constituency).

== Members of the Legislative Assembly ==
Year	Member	Party
Before 2010: See Dhanaha
2010	Rajesh Singh	Janata Dal (United)
2015	Dhirendra Pratap Singh	Independent
2020	Dhirendra Pratap Singh	Janata Dal (United)
2025	Surendra Prasad Kushwaha	Indian National Congress

== Election results ==
=== 2025 ===
2025 Bihar Legislative Assembly election: Valmiki Nagar
Party	Candidate	Votes	%	±%
INC	Surendra Prasad Kushwaha	107,730	46.11	▲18.83
JD(U)	Dhirendra Pratap Singh	106,055	45.39	▲7.07
BSP	Rameshwar Yadav	5,312	2.27	▼5.15
Independent	Mahmad Jalil	2,426	1.04	▼0.32
Lok Samaj Party	Rajesh Sharma	2,303	0.99	
NOTA	None of the above	6,400	2.74	▼1.4
Majority		1,675	0.72	▼10.32
Turnout		233,632	70.49	▲11.59
INC gain from JD(U)		Swing		

=== 2020 ===
Bihar Assembly election, 2020: Valmiki Nagar
Party	Candidate	Votes	%	±%
JD(U)	Dhirendra Pratap Singh	74,906	38.32	
INC	Rajesh Singh	53,321	27.28	+9.27
JAP(L)	Sumant Kumar	18,409	9.42	
BSP	Baidyanath Prasad	14,498	7.42	+1.42
LJP	Mahendra Kumar Bharti	6,612	3.38	
Bhartiya Party (Loktantrik)	Deepak Kumar Malakar	4,279	2.19	
The Plurals Party	Gaurav Jha	2,863	1.46	
Jan Sangharsh Dal	Saket Kumar Pathak	2,735	1.4	
Independent	Mahmad Jalil	2,657	1.36	
Independent	Rajesh Kumar	2,608	1.33	
Independent	Tirthraj Yadav	2,515	1.29	
Independent	Kumari Rajwanti Kushwaha	1,996	1.02	
NOTA	None of the above	8,090	4.14	+0.48
Majority		21,585	11.04	−7.12
Turnout		195,489	58.9	−3.68
JD(U) gain from Independent		Swing		

=== 2015 ===
2015 Bihar Legislative Assembly election: Valmiki Nagar
Party	Candidate	Votes	%	±%
Independent	Dhirendra Pratap Singh	66,860	36.17	
INC	Irshad Hussain	33,280	18.01	
RLSP	Surendra Prasad	32,855	17.78	
SP	Rajesh Singh	11,472	6.21	
BSP	Altaf Hussain	11,097	6.0	
Independent	Dip Narayan Mahato	8,355	4.52	
Independent	Shyam Narayan Prasad	3,196	1.73	
Independent	Virendra Yadav	2,477	1.34	
Independent	Surendra Singh	2,037	1.1	
Sarvajan Kalyan Loktantrik Party	Mahanth Chaudhary	1,973	1.07	
SS	Dhananjay Pandey	1,826	0.99	
NOTA	None of the above	6,767	3.66	
Majority		33,580	18.16	
Turnout		184,834	62.58	
Independent gain from JD(U)		Swing		

=== 2010 ===
2010 Bihar Legislative Assembly election: Valmiki Nagar
Party	Candidate	Votes	%	±%
JD(U)	Rajesh Singh	42,289	29.43	
RJD	Mukesh Kumar Kushwaha	27,618	19.22	
BSP	Dheerendra Pratap Singh	20,886	14.53	
INC	Irshad Hussain	17,747	12.35	
Independent	Deep Narayan Mahato	14,047	9.78	
JPS	Manoj Kumar Singh	8358	5.82	
Independent	Saket Kumar Pathak	4428	3.08	
Independent	Ramayan Chaudhary	1647	1.15	
Independent	Ram Naresh Sah	1610	1.12	
NCP	Shashi Bhusan Sahay	1334	0.93	
Independent	Pramod Sah	1114	0.78	
BJJD	Ramashankar Prasad	1042	0.73	
Independent	Insad Ali	835	0.58	
Independent	Pahawari Yadav	743	0.52	
Majority		14,611	10.21	
Turnout		1,43,698	59.77	
JD(U) win (new seat)				
