= Krishna Kumar Mishra =

Indian politician

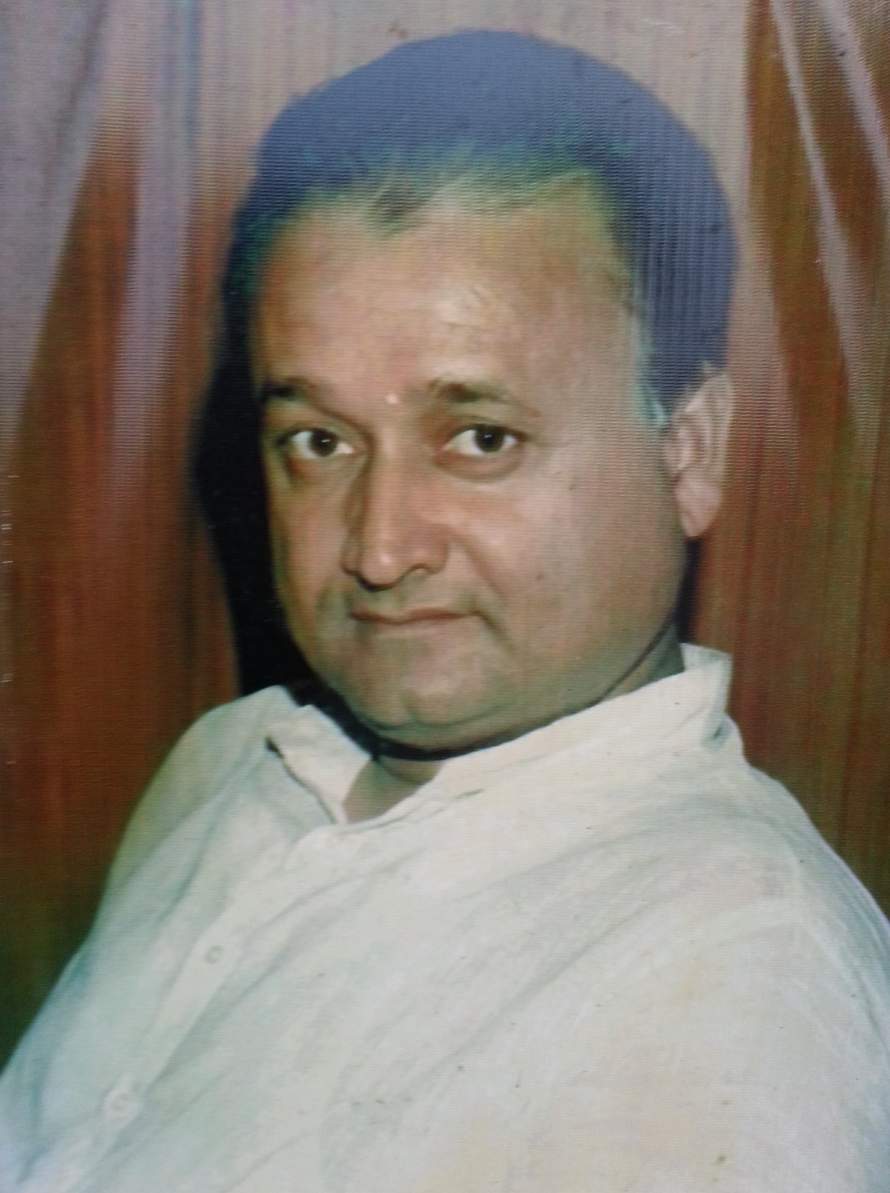
- Krishna Kumar Mishra, 1990–1995

Member of the Bihar Legislative Assembly for Chanpatia
- In office 2000 – 2005
- In office 1990 – 1995

Personal details
- Born: 9 August 1946 (age 79) Bettiah, Bihar
- Died: 31 January 2011 at age 65
- Nickname: Lallu Mishra

Krishna Kumar Mishra (also known as Lalu Mishra) was a member of Bihar Legislative Assembly. He was elected twice from Chanpatia Vidhan Sabha constituency in 1990 and 2000. He served as a Minister of Revenue and Land Reforms in the Government of Bihar from 1991 to 1995.

== See also ==
- List of politicians from Bihar
