= Lauriya Assembly constituency =

Constituency of the Bihar legislative assembly in India

- Constituency No. 5 for the Bihar Legislative Assembly

Constituency details
- Country: India
- Region: East India
- State: Bihar
- District: Paschim Champaran
- Lok Sabha constituency: Valmiki Nagar
- Established: 1957
- Total electors: 252,171
- Reservation: None

Member of Legislative Assembly
- 18th Bihar Legislative Assembly
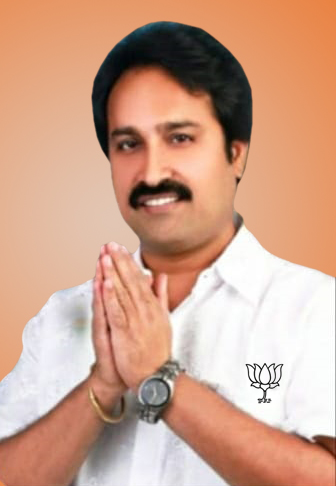
- Incumbent Vinay Bihari
- Party: BJP
- Alliance: NDA
- Elected year: 2025

Lauriya Assembly constituency is an assembly constituency in Paschim Champaran district in the Indian state of Bihar.

Lauriya is one of six assembly constituencies in the Valmiki Nagar (Lok Sabha constituency). Since 2008, this assembly constituency is numbered 5 amongst 243 constituencies.

== Overview ==
As per orders of Delimitation of Parliamentary and Assembly constituencies Order, 2008, 5. Lauriya Assembly constituency is composed of the following: Yogapatti community development block; and Siswania, Kataiya, Marahiya Pakari, Mathia, Lauriya, Belwa Lakhanpur, Gobaraura, Bahuarwa, Dhobani Dharampur, Dhamaura, Daniyal Prasauna, Sathi, Singhpur Satawaria, Basantpur and Baswariya Parautola gram panchayats of Lauriya CD Block.

== Members of the Legislative Assembly ==
Year	Name	Party
Before 1957: See Shikarpur-cum-Lauriya
1957	Subh Narayan Prasad	Indian National Congress
1962	Subh Narayan Prasad	Indian National Congress
1967	Shatru Mardan Sahi	Independent
1969	Shatru Mardan Sahi	Swatantra Party
1972	Fulena Rao	Indian National Congress
1977	Vishwa Mohan Sharma	Indian National Congress
1980	Vishwa Mohan Sharma	Indian National Congress
1985	Vishwa Mohan Sharma	Indian National Congress
1990	Ran Vijay Shahi	Janata Dal
1995	Ran Vijay Shahi	Janata Dal
2000	Vishwa Mohan Sharma	Indian National Congress
2005	Pradeep Singh	Janata Dal (United)
2005	Pradeep Singh	Janata Dal (United)
2010	Vinay Bihari	Independent
2015	Vinay Bihari	Bharatiya Janata Party
2020	Vinay Bihari	Bharatiya Janata Party
2025	Vinay Bihari	Bharatiya Janata Party

== Election results ==
=== 2025 ===
2025 Bihar Legislative Assembly election: Lauriya
Party	Candidate	Votes	%	±%
BJP	Vinay Bihari	96,510	50.36	+0.88
VIP	Ran Kaushal Pratap Singh	69,544	36.29	
JSP	Sunil Kumar	15,722	8.2	
The Plurals Party	Pappu Kumar Thakur	4,035	2.11	+1.18
BSP	Mohammad Haroon	3,442	1.8	−9.32
NOTA	None of the above	2,394	1.25	−0.89
Majority		26,966	14.07	−4.35
Turnout		191,647	76.0	+14.55
BJP hold		Swing		

=== 2020 ===
Bihar Assembly election, 2020: Lauriya
Party	Candidate	Votes	%	±%
BJP	Vinay Bihari	77,927	49.48	+9.01
RJD	Shambhu Tiwari	48,923	31.06	+2.99
BSP	Ran Kaushal Pratap Singh	17,515	11.12	+4.77
Independent	Neelam Singh	1,906	1.21	
Independent	Doctor Mahto	1,541	0.98	
The Plurals Party	Ajitesh Kumar	1,462	0.93	
NOTA	None of the above	3,368	2.14	+0.4
Majority		29,004	18.42	+6.02
Turnout		157,495	61.45	−1.32
BJP hold		Swing		

=== 2015 ===
2015 Bihar Legislative Assembly election: Lauriya
Party	Candidate	Votes	%	±%
BJP	Vinay Bihari	57,351	40.47	
RJD	Ran Kaushal Pratap Singh	39,778	28.07	
Independent	Shambhu Tiwari	20,793	14.67	
BSP	Sunil Kumar	8,994	6.35	
NCP	Pradeep Singh	3,195	2.25	
Independent	Santosh Kumar Rai	2,280	1.61	
Independent	Navin Kumar	1,908	1.35	
CPI	Ram Babu Kumar Sankritya	1,729	1.22	
NOTA	None of the above	2,459	1.74	
Majority		17,573	12.4	
Turnout		141,706	62.77	
BJP gain from Independent		Swing		

=== 2010 ===
2010 Bihar Legislative Assembly election: Lauriya
Party	Candidate	Votes	%	±%
Independent	Vinay Bihari	38,381	33.44	
JD(U)	Pradeep Singh	27,500	23.96	
RJD	Shambhu Tiwari	22,140	19.29	
INC	Vishwa Mohan Sharma	9,582	8.35	
BSP	Santosh Kumar Rao	4,133	3.60	
Majority		10,881	9.48	
Turnout		1,14,776	60.14	
Independent gain from JD(U)		Swing		
