= Bagaha Lok Sabha constituency =

Former constituency of the Lok Sabha in Bihar, India

Coordinates: 27.1°N 84.1°E

Bagaha
- Former Lok Sabha constituency

Constituency details
- Country: India
- Region: East India
- State: Bihar
- Established: 1952
- Abolished: 2008
- Reservation: SC

Bagaha was a Lok Sabha constituency in Bihar state in eastern India till 2008.

== Assembly segments ==
Bagaha Lok Sabha constituency comprised six Vidhan Sabha (legislative assembly) segments, which were:

1. Valmiki Nagar
2. Ramnagar
3. Shikarpur
4. Sikta
5. Lauriya

== Members of Parliament ==
Year	Name	Party
1952	Bhola Raut	Indian National Congress
1957	Bhola Raut	Indian National Congress
1962	Bhola Raut	Indian National Congress
1967	Bhola Raut	Indian National Congress
1971	Bhola Raut	Indian National Congress
1977	Jagannath Prasad Swatantra	Janata Party
1980	Bhola Raut	Indian National Congress (I)
1984	Bhola Raut	Indian National Congress
1989	Mahendra Baitha	Janata Dal
1991	Mahendra Baitha	Janata Dal
1996	Mahendra Baitha	Samata Party
1998	Mahendra Baitha	Samata Party
1999	Mahendra Baitha	Janata Dal (United)
2004	Kailash Baitha	Janata Dal (United)
2009 onwards : See Valmiki Nagar

== Election results ==
=== 1991 ===
1991 Indian general election: Bagaha
Party	Candidate	Votes	%	±%
JD	Mahendra Baitha	182,265	46.45	
BJP	Kanchan Baitha	1,33,690	34.07	
INC	Narsingh Baitha	57,717	14.71	
Margin of victory		48,575	12.38	
Turnout		3,92,368	45.39	
JD hold		Swing		

== See also ==
- West Champaran district
- List of former constituencies of the Lok Sabha
