= Vinay Bihari =

Politician from Bihar, India

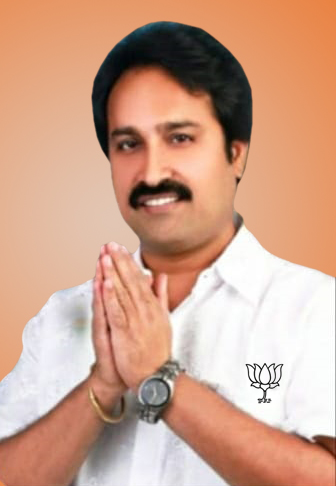
- Vinay Bihari 2020

Member of Bihar Legislative Assembly
- Incumbent
- Assumed office 2010
- Preceded by: Pradeep Singh
- Constituency: Lauriya

Personal details
- Born: 5 January 1970 (age 56) Bihar, India
- Party: Bharatiya Janata Party
- Occupation: Politician; Preducer

Vinay Bihari (born 5 January 1970) is a politician and film director from Bihar. He has won the Bihar Legislative Assembly election in 2010 and 2015 from Lauriya Assembly constituency, Lauriya.

== Political career ==
Vinay continuously won 3 elections from the Lauriya assembly constituency of Bihar. 1st election he won was as an independent candidate in 2010 and then he joined BJP and won continuously three elections in 2015,2020 and 2025 on the ticket of Bharatiya Janata Party. He defeated Rankaushal Pratap Singh of RJD who got 39778 votes. Vinay Bihari got 57,351 votes in that election.

On 1 March 2017, Bihari ended a months-long protest in which he called for the government to build a 44 km road in his constituency by stripping to his underwear.

In the 2020 Bihar Elections, Bihari contested with the BJP from the Lauriya constituency and defeated RJD's leading campaigner.

He was re-elected in 2025 as a BJP candidate.
