= Valmiki Nagar =

Village in Maharashtra

Valmiki Nagar is a small village in Ratnagiri district, Maharashtra state in Western India. The 2011 Census of India recorded a total of 1,395 residents in the village. Valmiki Nagar's geographical area is 133 hectares (330 acres).
