= BBW =

BBW may refer to:

== Science and technology ==
- Belgian Blue Whetstone, a natural Belgian sharpening stone
- Brake-by-wire, a brake technology in the automotive industry
- Borel–Weil–Bott theorem in mathematics
- Banana bacterial wilt

== Events ==
- Banned Books Week, an awareness campaign by the American Library Association
- Big Bad Wolf Books, a Malaysian book fair
- Black Bike Week, annual motorcycle rally in Myrtle Beach, South Carolina

== Media and entertainment ==
- Basketball Wives, a reality television show on VH1
- "BBW" (song), a 2026 song by Drake off the album Maid of Honour
- "BBW" (JPEGMafia song), a 2019 song by JPEGMafia off the album All My Heroes Are Cornballs
- Bloomberg Businessweek, an American weekly magazine
- Brave Battle Warriors, a subseries of BB Senshi Sangokuden
- Bucharest Business Week, a Romanian weekly newspaper

== Organizations, companies and brands ==
- Bath & Body Works, a toiletry company
- Browns Backers Worldwide, an organization of fans of the Cleveland Browns American football team
- Build-A-Bear Workshop, a stuffed animal retailer (NYSE stock symbol BBW)
- bbw University of Applied Sciences, Berlin-Charlottenburg, Germany
- BB Airways (IATA airline code BO; ICAO airline code BBW), Norwegian airline
- Volkswagen BBW engine; see List of North American Volkswagen engines

== Places ==
- Bodarwar railway station (rail station code BBW), Muzaffarpur–Gorakhpur main line
- Broken Bow Municipal Airport (ICAO airport code KBBW; IATA airport code BBW), Broken Bow, Custer County, Nebraska, USA

== Other uses ==
- Big Beautiful Woman, a term for a large-bodied woman
- bbw, the ISO 639 code for Baba language
