= Mahuawa Khurd railway station =

Railway station in Uttar Pradesh, India

Mahuawa Khurd

General information
- Location: Pipraich-Kaptangunj Road, Mahuawa Khurd, Mujahana, Gorakhpur district, Uttar Pradesh; India
- Coordinates: 26°51′16″N 83°35′38″E
- Elevation: 88 m (289 ft)
- System: Passenger train station
- Owner: Indian Railways
- Operator: North Eastern Railway
- Line: Muzaffarpur–Gorakhpur main line
- Platforms: 1
- Tracks: 1

Construction
- Structure type: Standard (on ground station)

Other information
- Status: Active
- Station code: MUUA
- Zone(s): North Eastern Railway zone
- Division(s): Varanasi

History
- Opened: 1930s

Services
Preceding station	Indian Railways	Following station
Pipraich towards ?	North Eastern Railway zone Muzaffarpur–Gorakhpur main line	Bodarwar towards ?
Location

Mahuawa Khurd railway station is a railway station on Muzaffarpur–Gorakhpur main line under the Varanasi railway division of North Eastern Railway zone. This is situated beside Pipraich-Kaptangunj Road at Mahuawa Khurd, Mujahana in Gorakhpur district of the Indian state of Uttar Pradesh.
