= Bodarwar railway station =

Railway station in Uttar Pradesh, India

Bodarwar

General information
- Location: Pipraich-Kaptangunj Road, Bodarwar, Kushinagar district, Uttar Pradesh; India
- Coordinates: 26°52′41″N 83°38′17″E
- Elevation: 89 m (292 ft)
- System: Passenger train station
- Owner: Indian Railways
- Operator: North Eastern Railway
- Line: Muzaffarpur–Gorakhpur main line
- Platforms: 2
- Tracks: 1

Construction
- Structure type: Standard (on ground station)

Other information
- Status: Active
- Station code: BBW
- Zone(s): North Eastern Railway zone
- Division(s): Varanasi

History
- Opened: 1930s

Services
Preceding station	Indian Railways	Following station
Mahuawa Khurd towards ?	North Eastern Railway zone Muzaffarpur–Gorakhpur main line	Kaptanganj Junction towards ?
Location

Bodarwar railway station is a railway station on Muzaffarpur–Gorakhpur main line under the Varanasi railway division of North Eastern Railway zone. This is situated beside Pipraich-Kaptangunj Road at Bodarwar in Kushinagar district of the Indian state of Uttar Pradesh.
