= Gaura Village, Gorakhpur =

Village in Uttar Pradesh, India

Gaura is a village in Gorakhpur District in Uttar Pradesh, India. It is situated about 5 km from Pipraich railway station towards Bela Kaanta. In 2011 the population was 2,649, with a literacy rate of 66.51%.
