= Preußenpark =

Park in Berlin, Germany

Coordinates: 52°29′34″N 13°18′46″E

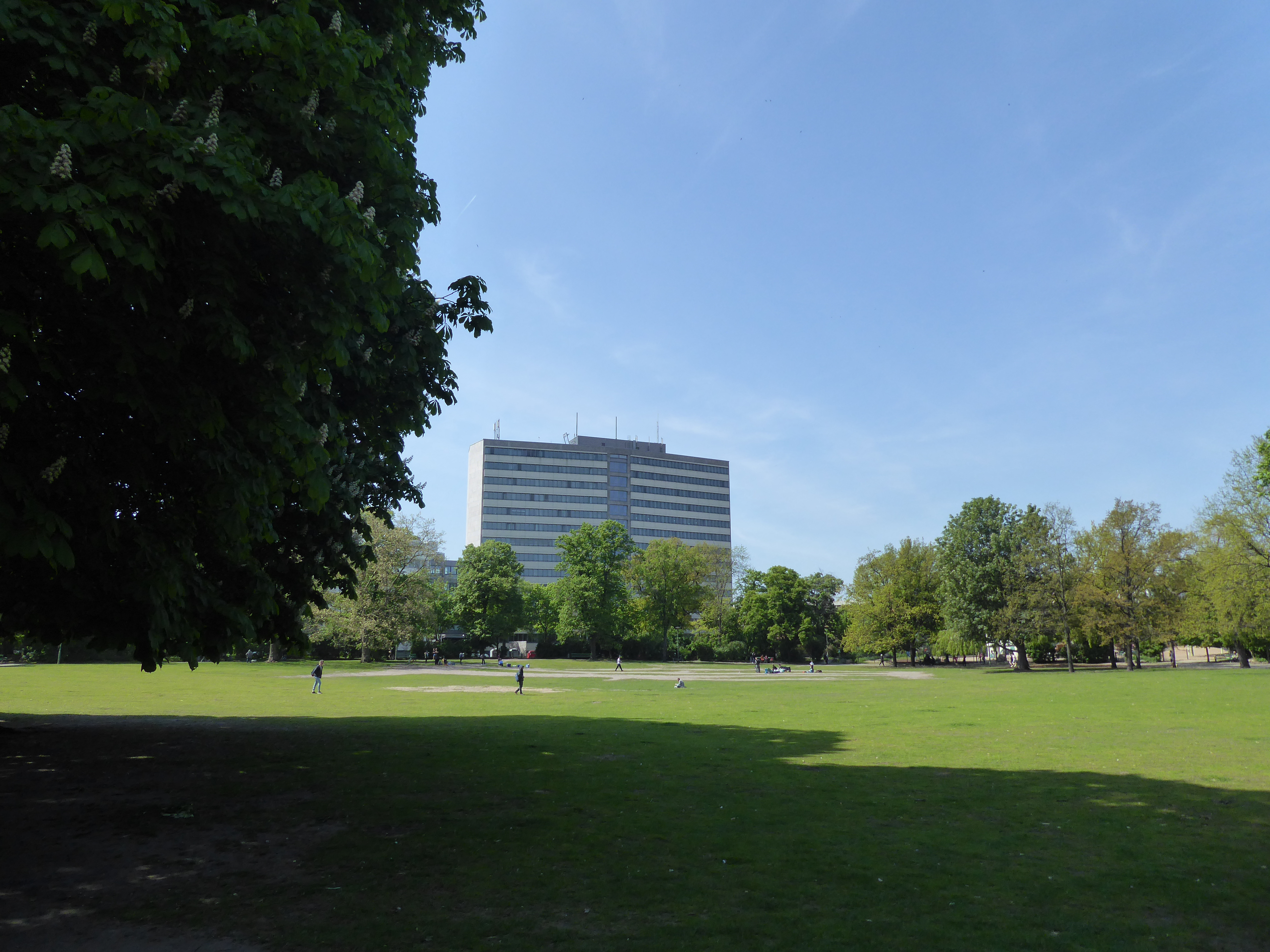
Preußenpark

Preußenpark (Prussian Park), also known as Thai Park or ThaiPark Berlin, is a public park in the Berlin quarter of Wilmersdorf, which belongs to the district of Charlottenburg-Wilmersdorf. With a size of 55,000 m^{2}, the park is one of the smaller parks in Berlin. North of Fehrbelliner Platz, Preußenpark extends between Brandenburgische Straße and Württembergische Straße to Pommersche Straße.

The park has several sculptures, including Antilope, created by the sculptor Artur Hoffman in 1926, and Borussia, a five-metre-high sculpture originally created by the sculptor Reinhold Begas in 1855. Previously it featured also Faustkämpfer (Pugilists) created by Eberhard Encke in the 1920s and lost in WWII. Since the 1990s, the park has become known as a meeting place for Thais and East Asians who host markets and festivities during the summer months.

== History ==
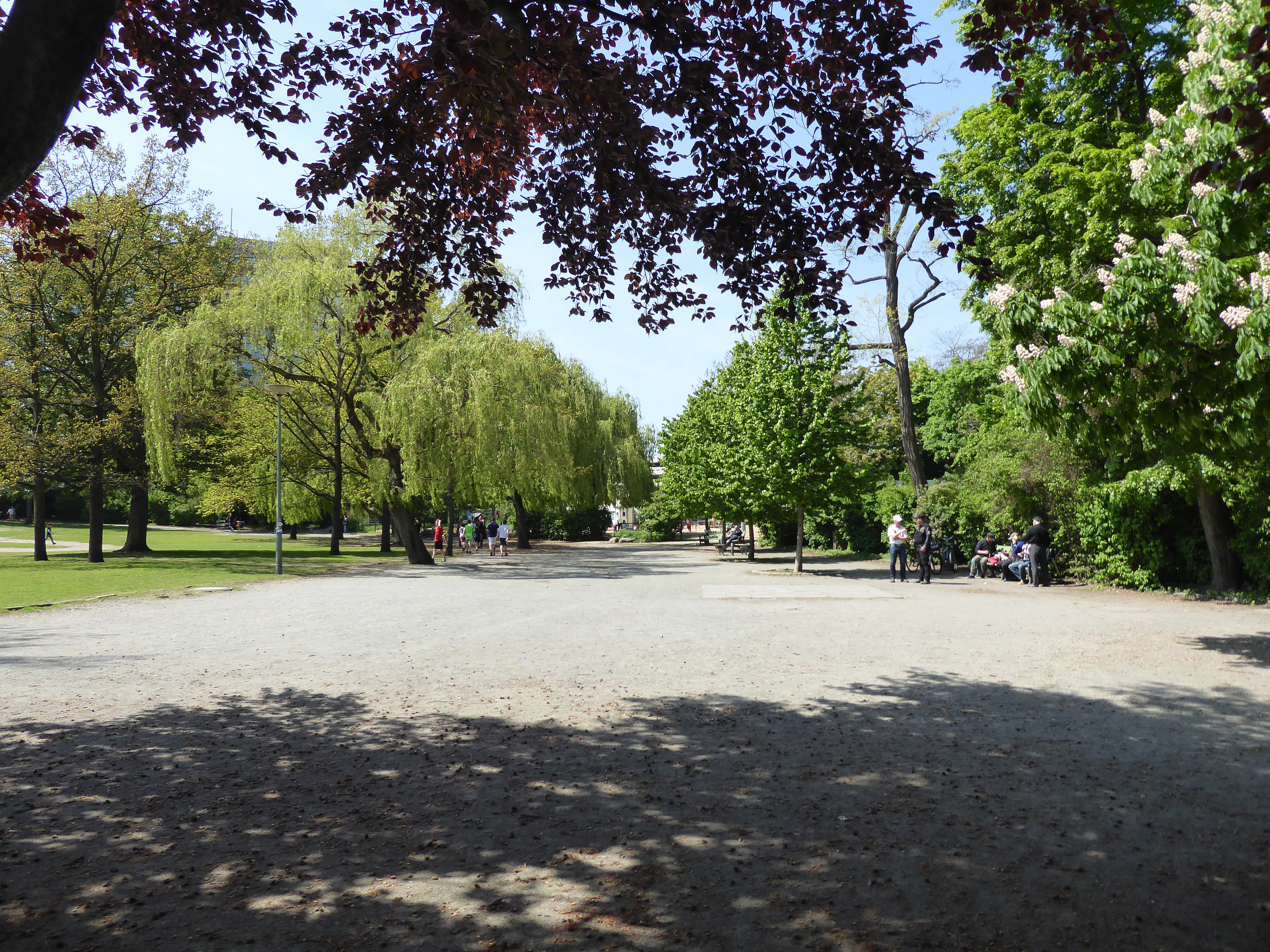
Walking in Preußenpark

The park was laid out in 1904 according to designs by the garden architect Richard Thieme as Platz D. At that time, the square comprised only the northwestern area of today's park. The size was 17,000 m^{2}.

In the southern area, between Brandenburgische Straße and Württembergische Straße, the new building of the Wilmersdorf City Hall was planned. Around 1910, based on designs by the architect Otto Herrnring, a toilet house was built on the western edge of the park on Brandenburgische Straße, which has survived and is now a listed building. After the town hall plans north of Fehrbelliner Platz were abandoned, the area was integrated into the park. The planning for this was done between 1920 and 1925, again by Richard Thieme. The oval of the large lawn, which still exists today, was joined by a broad axis to the south that led centrally to Fehrbelliner Platz. This was designed as an ornamental square between Hohenzollerndamm and Preußenpark.

In the second half of the 1930s, a further enlargement and redesign of the park took place. The area east of Bayerische Straße was integrated into the park complex and Bayerische Straße south of Pommersche Straße was removed. The opening of the new part of the park took place on June 4, 1938. Nearly 5000 shrubs were planted in this area. Richard Thieme was again responsible for the planning as the district garden director. The area south of the oval was redesigned. The main axis disappeared and was replaced by curved paths. The ornamental square on Fehrbelliner Platz was leveled into a parade ground. The park now had different benches for Aryan and (in yellow) for non-Aryan visitors. Likewise, there were separate playgrounds for children.

After World War II, in 1949 a hill was filled in the northeast corner of the park and the parade ground became a parking lot. In 1959, a new children's playground was again built in the northeast. At the southern edge of the roundel of the lawn is one of four geodetic reference points in Berlin.

== Sculptures ==
There are several works of sculpture in the Prussia Park.

=== Antilope ===
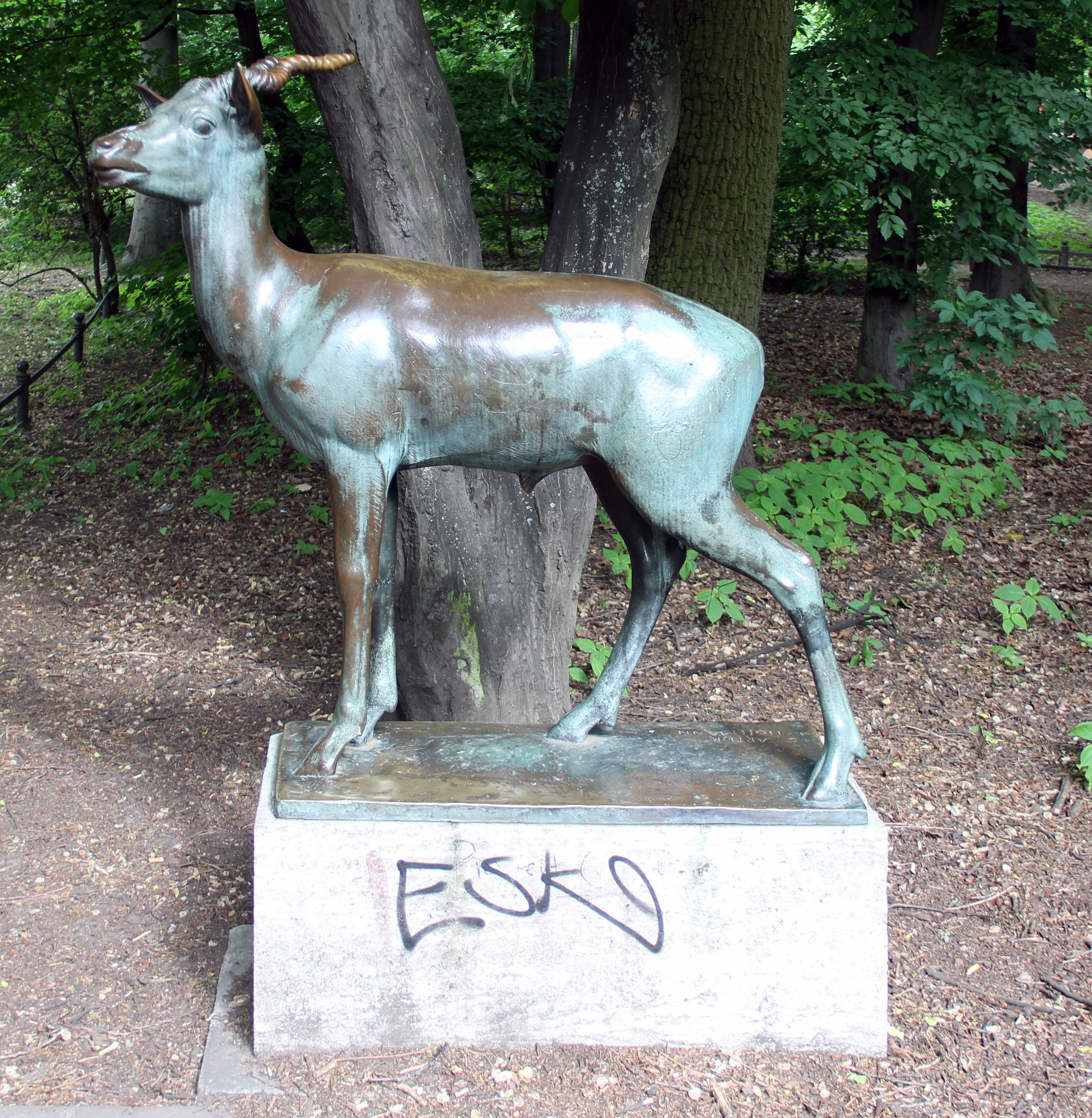
Antilope by Artur Hoffmann

In 1926, the Berliner Straßenbahn-Betriebs-GmbH, which had apartments for its employees on Pommersche Strasse, had the bronze sculpture of a life-size antelope erected in Preußenpark, named Antilope (Antelope). The work was created by the sculptor Artur Hoffmann. However, the installation was carried out without the permission of the city of Berlin, on whose land the sculpture was erected. In October 1926, the Berlin City Council subsequently approved the installation. In 1944, the antelope disappeared and was probably melted down. In 1955, a new cast was made during the sculptor's lifetime, based on his original. In the tradition of the first installation, the Gemeinnützige Heimstätten-Gesellschaft, the subsidiary of BVG for the management of BVG's housing property, took over the financing.

=== Borussia ===
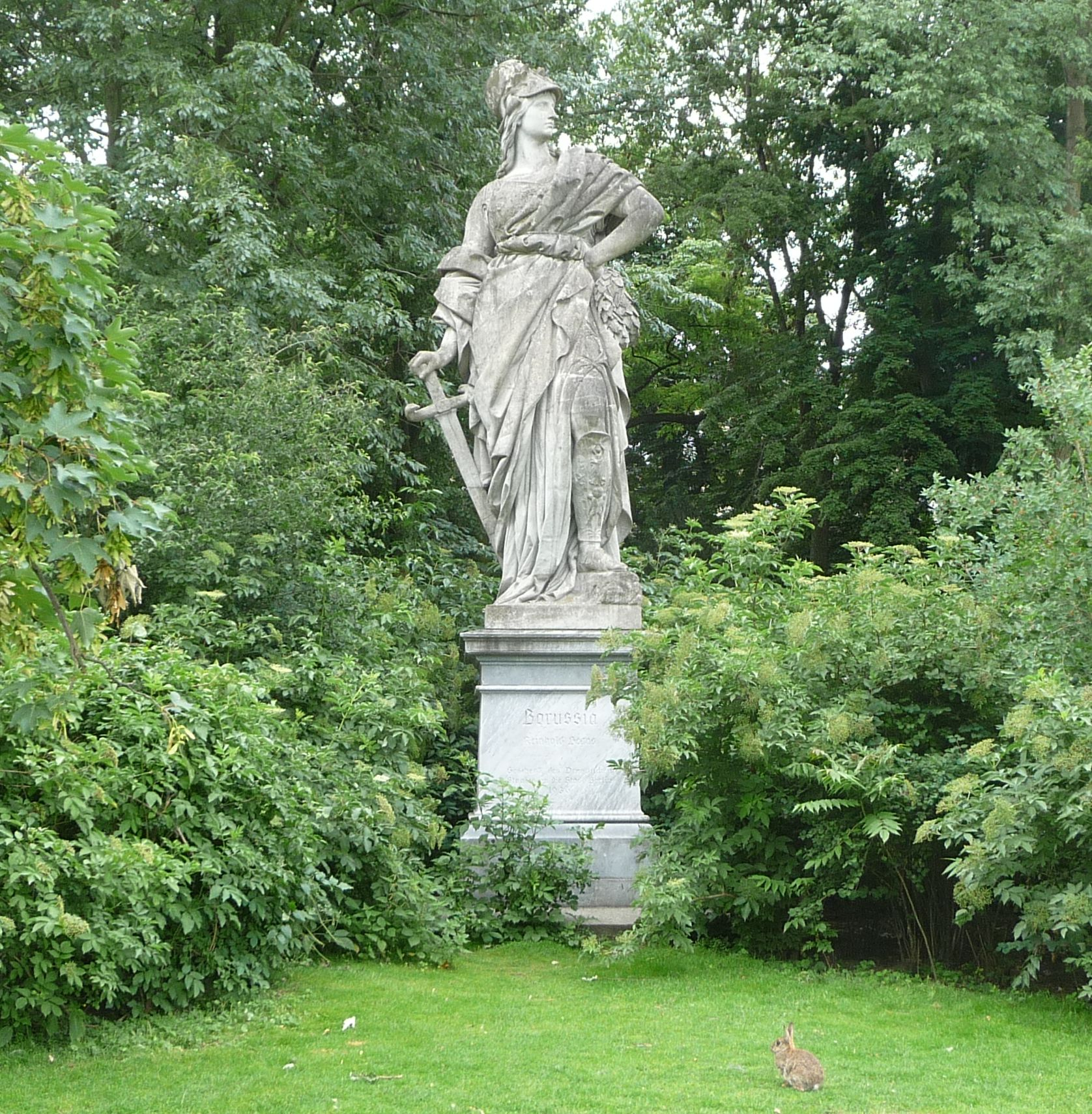
Statue of the eponymous Borussia

In 1936, the Free State of Prussia donated to the city of Berlin the sculpture Borussia, which had been created by the sculptor Reinhold Begas in 1855. The sculpture is about five meters high and was placed in the Prussian Park on a pedestal about two meters high. This shows the personification of Prussia in the form of a female figure with helmet, armor, sword and flowing robe. In 1980, the marble original was placed in the Lapidarium to protect it from environmental influences. A cast stone copy was installed on February 14, 1981.

=== Birdbath with duck ===
On the lawn is a birdbath with duck, created by sculptor Rudolf Leptien in the 1950s from shell limestone.

=== Faustkämpfer ===
As part of the creation of the wide main axis in the early 1920s, the sculpture Faustkämpfer (Pugilists) by Eberhard Encke was placed at the widened southern end of the main axis. The sculpture, along with other Charlottenburg landmarks, is described in Vladimir Nabokov's The Gift, set in the Weimar-era Berlin. Around 1934, Pugilists were moved to the Humboldt Park, today's Volkspark Wilmersdorf. It is also said to have been melted down in 1944.

== "Thaiwiese" ==
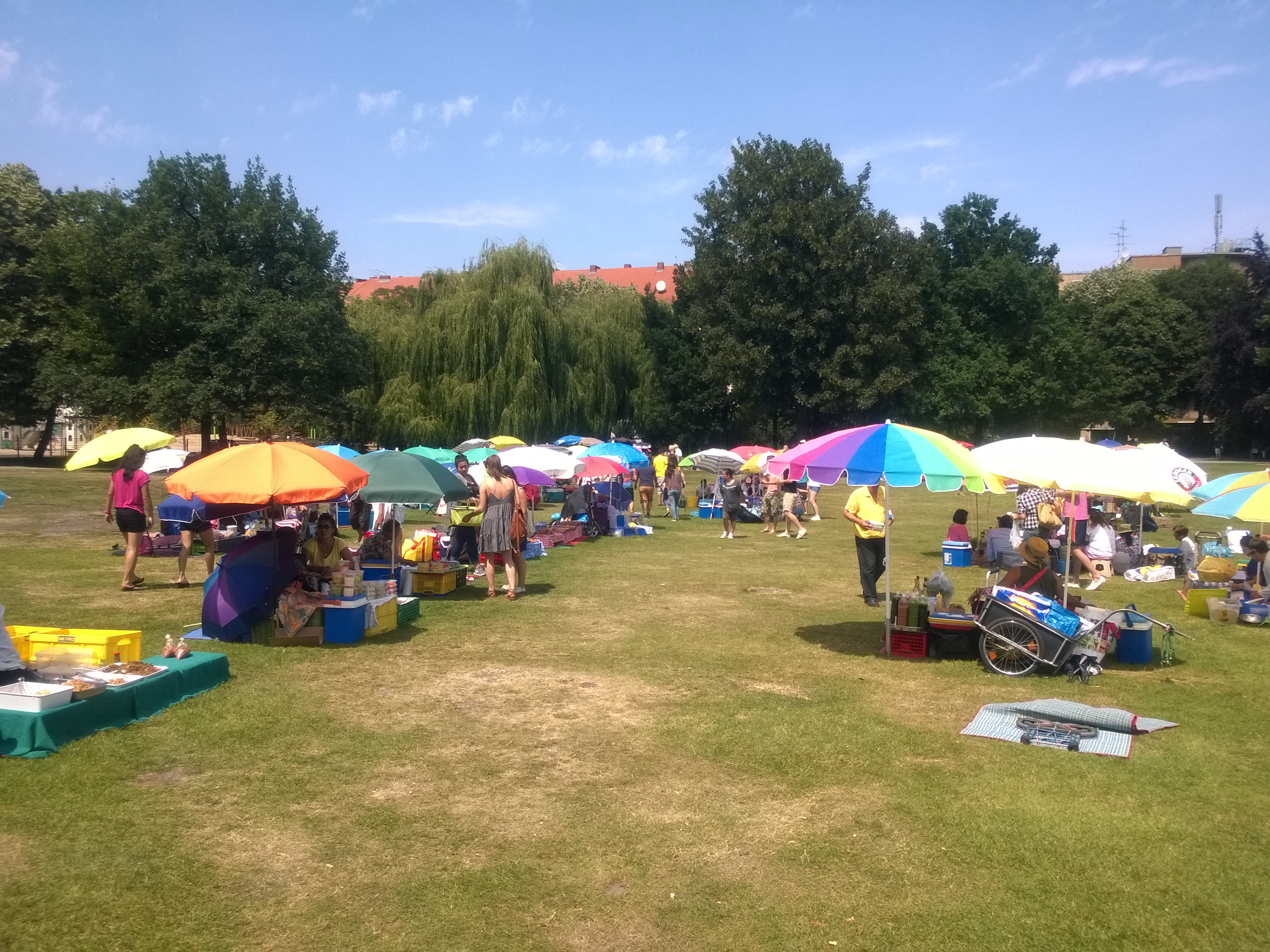
"Thaiwiese"

Sometime in the mid-1990s, the park's sunbathing lawn developed into a popular meeting place known as "Thaiwiese" ("Thai meadow"), for people of East Asian origin - mainly Thais, but also Filipinos, Chinese, Vietnamese and Laotians. They gather here in fine weather to meet friends and acquaintances and sell home-prepared food. This turned into a street food market that became known far beyond the Charlottenburg-Wilmersdorf district and is now mentioned in travel guides. The market was never approved, but grew anarchically out of the family reunion of Thai Berliners. The sale and preparation of food is not allowed, so the official version is that Thai families picnic and visitors are kindly offered something.

On September 20, 2017, it was announced that a political decision had to be made either to limit the street food market to a few "legalized" fixed sales stalls or to enforce the market ban with permanent controls. During a raid three days later, police officers spoke to journalists of a misappropriation of the park, violations of the Green Spaces Protection Act and of food law, as well as of missing business licenses on the part of the vendors. In 2020, the district administration planned to downsize and legalize the street food market. The street food market was banned from the park on 31 December 2021.

Since July 31, 2021, the Thailändische Verein Berlin e.V. (Thai Association of Berlin) has been operating a street food market in the park on an interim basis with permission from the Charlottenburg-Wilmersdorf district office "until a market building was completed." The operation is limited to Friday through Sunday from 10 am to 8 pm and ended on October 31. In 2022, the market reopened on April 2, 2022, and the opening was celebrated on April 16, along with the Songkran Festival.
