= Nelson Mandela School, Berlin =

Nelson Mandela School

Location
- Berlin; Germany; 52.491°N 13.321°E

Information
- Founded: 2000
- School number: IB: 2330
- Principal: Dr. Hans Günther Bauer (secondary) and Ina Claussen (primary)
- Grades: Kindergarten-12/13
- Gender: All Genders
- Average class size: 20-25
- Hours in school day: 8, depending on classes
- Campuses: 2
- Song: Side by Side
- Nickname: NMS
- Newspaper: 46664
- Yearbook: The Nelson Mandela School Yearbook
- Tuition: Free, apart from $1000 for IB Exams

The Nelson Mandela School is a public (state-funded) international school in Berlin, Charlottenburg-Wilmersdorf.

Classes are taught both in German and English. Primary school is from class 1 - 6, secondary school is from class 7 - 12 or 13. After year 10, students take the middle school exams (Mittlerer Schulabschluss), after which the students have the freedom to choose between the German bilingual Abitur or the International Baccalaureate Diploma Programme.

== History ==
The Nelson Mandela School was founded in 2000 by the Berlin senate. At this time, the school was still in Lichterfelde and only housed three or four classes. It then moved to Pfalzburger Str. 23 where it stayed for one year before the secondary relocated to Kastanienallee in 2003. The primary remained at Pfalzburger Str. 23. An extension for the primary—a new building directly adjacent to the old one—was constructed in 2007. The school grew rapidly until the secondary saw the need to move again, this time to Pfalzburger Str. 30, just down the road from the primary. This happened in 2011. Until this day, construction on the secondary school yard has not completely ceased.

In 2013, an extension of the school, called the NMS-NEO, was founded and moved into a building in another district. This school has only a few classes and officially belongs to Nelson Mandela, however the purpose of it is to eventually become a different state international and bilingual school.

As the old head retired in 2011, 2013 saw the introduction of a new one.

== Management ==
Both the primary and the secondary school have a head. The primary has a sub-head just for that school. The secondary school has a deputy head. There are department heads for all subjects, both in the Primary and the Secondary school.

== Timetable ==
=== Primary ===
The Primary school offers classes 1–6. Classes 1&2 are taught together. The average class size is around 22-24 students. The teaching teams consist of a German-speaking and an English-speaking teacher, as well as a social pedagogue (educator).

Primary classes commence at 8 a.m. and cease at 4 p.m. Exceptions are Fridays, on which classes generally cease at 12.30 or 13.15. There is a morning break and a lunch break as well as free-time and study time (supervised lessons for working independently). Lessons are taught in either German or English. Mathematics tends to be taught in German, Science and Social Studies are mostly taught by the international English-speaking colleagues. Electives like computing, cooking, art or running are offered once a week for classes 3/4 and 5/6.

NMS Primary is inclusive and has an extensive team of social pedagogues to support students with special needs.

=== Secondary ===
Classes at Nelson-Mandela start at 8 a.m. usually, however this can vary depending on the timetable. Particularly in upper secondary, classes can commence at a later time.

The lessons are 45 minutes in length, with five-minute breaks in between to allow time for relocating to the next classroom or eating and drinking, for example. Lessons are taught in German or English; this depends on the teacher entirely. Hence, situations can arise when one has a particular subject in German one year and in English the next, or vice versa. However, the school tries very hard to decrease situations like this and is very open when it comes to language issues.

There is a fixed 15 minute break from 09:35 to 09:50 and a fixed 20 minute break later in the day from 13:05 to 13:25. Students also have at least one free lunch period every day (or even multiple free lessons for IB and Abitur students).

Classes usually cease at 15:50. This can and does vary hugely, however, and some upper secondary students are required to take the 10th lesson, which ends at 16:40, or can leave earlier. Many school clubs and groups meet after school. These meetings vary in length, however they usually do not last longer than 2 hours.

== Facilities ==
=== Secondary ===
The school yard has a basketball court, benches, a running track and a table tennis table and a gym hall, which is equipped with a variety of athletic equipment. There is also the academic library, which not only has computers and laptops but also numerous books, magazines and films on different subjects and the lending library, from which one can lend novels.

As to the architecture of the school building, the Nelson-Mandela-School is housed in the old building and the new building, which is reached by crossing the school yard. The former has three floors—the first one contains classrooms, the second one science labs (all science classes are taught here) and two computer rooms, and the third one consists of classrooms, the two music rooms and the Aula, an assembly hall where the school assembles regularly. The ground floor is made up of the canteen, the library and the secretary's and principal's offices.

The two floors in the new building contain classrooms only; the first one has two art rooms in which all art classes are taught. The ground floor houses the kitchen—for vocational education purposes—and the wood workshop. P.E. classes are taught in the gym adjacent to the school yard, the Wilmersdorfer Sportplatz (which is a short walk away from the school) or occasionally also the nearby Preußenpark. The Nelson Mandela School's yearly Bundesjugendspiele take place at the Stadion Wilmersdorf, located close to S Hohenzollerndamm.

Many classrooms are equipped with interactive white-boards. Each classroom has a computer linked up to the white board or beamer. There are two fully equipped computer rooms. The entire school is connected to fast-speed Internet and has wifí access for teachers and upper Secondary students.

The library is well-equipped with books, reference materials and digital workspaces for either PCs or laptops. Laptops and hotspots can be borrowed here for projects and in times of online learning.

=== Primary ===
The old building of the primary has four floors, on which there are classrooms and one computer room and an art room. The new building contains a science laboratory, a computer room and the "Bewegungsraum" (the "motion room", in which dance and drama classes are held). The school also has one music room, a canteen, the Aula (which can be used for sports classes as well as assemblies) and the "Foyer". There is a library.

There are two school yards, a larger one containing a variety of different objects like a football court, table tennis tables or a slide, and the "Chill Hof" ("chill yard"), which is considerably smaller.

As in the secondary, in the primary there are interactive white-boards in the classrooms, but this varies.

== Notable alumni ==
- Bibi Bourelly, musician
