= Pipraich railway station =

Railway station in Uttar Pradesh, India

Pipraich

General information
- Location: Gorakhpur Bypass, Pipraich, Gorakhpur district, Uttar Pradesh; India
- Coordinates: 26°49′42″N 83°32′09″E
- Elevation: 86 m (282 ft)
- System: Passenger train station
- Owner: Indian Railways
- Operator: North Eastern Railway
- Line: Muzaffarpur–Gorakhpur main line
- Platforms: 2
- Tracks: 1

Construction
- Structure type: Standard (on ground station)

Other information
- Status: Active
- Station code: PPC
- Zone(s): North Eastern Railway zone
- Division(s): Varanasi

History
- Opened: 1930s

Services
Preceding station	Indian Railways	Following station
Unaula towards ?	North Eastern Railway zone Muzaffarpur–Gorakhpur main line	Mahuawa Khurd towards ?
Location

Pipraich railway station is a railway station on Muzaffarpur–Gorakhpur main line under the Varanasi railway division of North Eastern Railway zone. This is situated beside Gorakhpur Bypass at Pipraich in Gorakhpur district of the Indian state of Uttar Pradesh.
