= Unaula railway station =

Railway station in Uttar Pradesh, India

Unaula

General information
- Location: Unaula Awal, Gorakhpur district, Uttar Pradesh; India
- Coordinates: 26°47′18″N 83°28′17″E
- Elevation: 85 m (279 ft)
- System: Passenger train station
- Owner: Indian Railways
- Operator: North Eastern Railway
- Line: Muzaffarpur–Gorakhpur main line
- Platforms: 2
- Tracks: 1

Construction
- Structure type: Standard (on ground station)

Other information
- Status: Active
- Station code: UNLA
- Zone(s): North Eastern Railway zone
- Division(s): Varanasi

History
- Opened: 1930s

Services
Preceding station	Indian Railways	Following station
Gorakhpur Cantonment towards ?	North Eastern Railway zone Muzaffarpur–Gorakhpur main line	Pipraich towards ?
Location

Unaula railway station is a railway station on Muzaffarpur–Gorakhpur main line under the Varanasi railway division of North Eastern Railway zone. This is situated at Unaula Awal in Gorakhpur district of the Indian state of Uttar Pradesh.
