= Volkspark Wilmersdorf =

Public park in Berlin, Germany

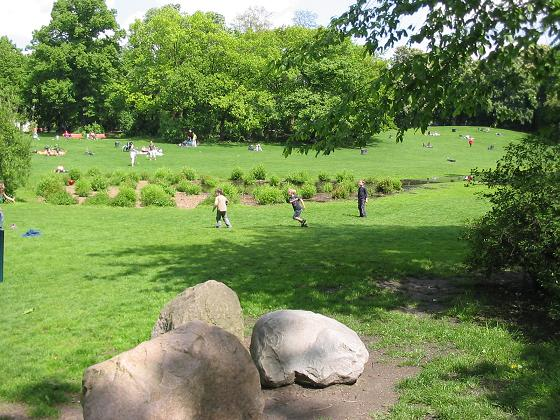
- Meadow in the eastern section of the park

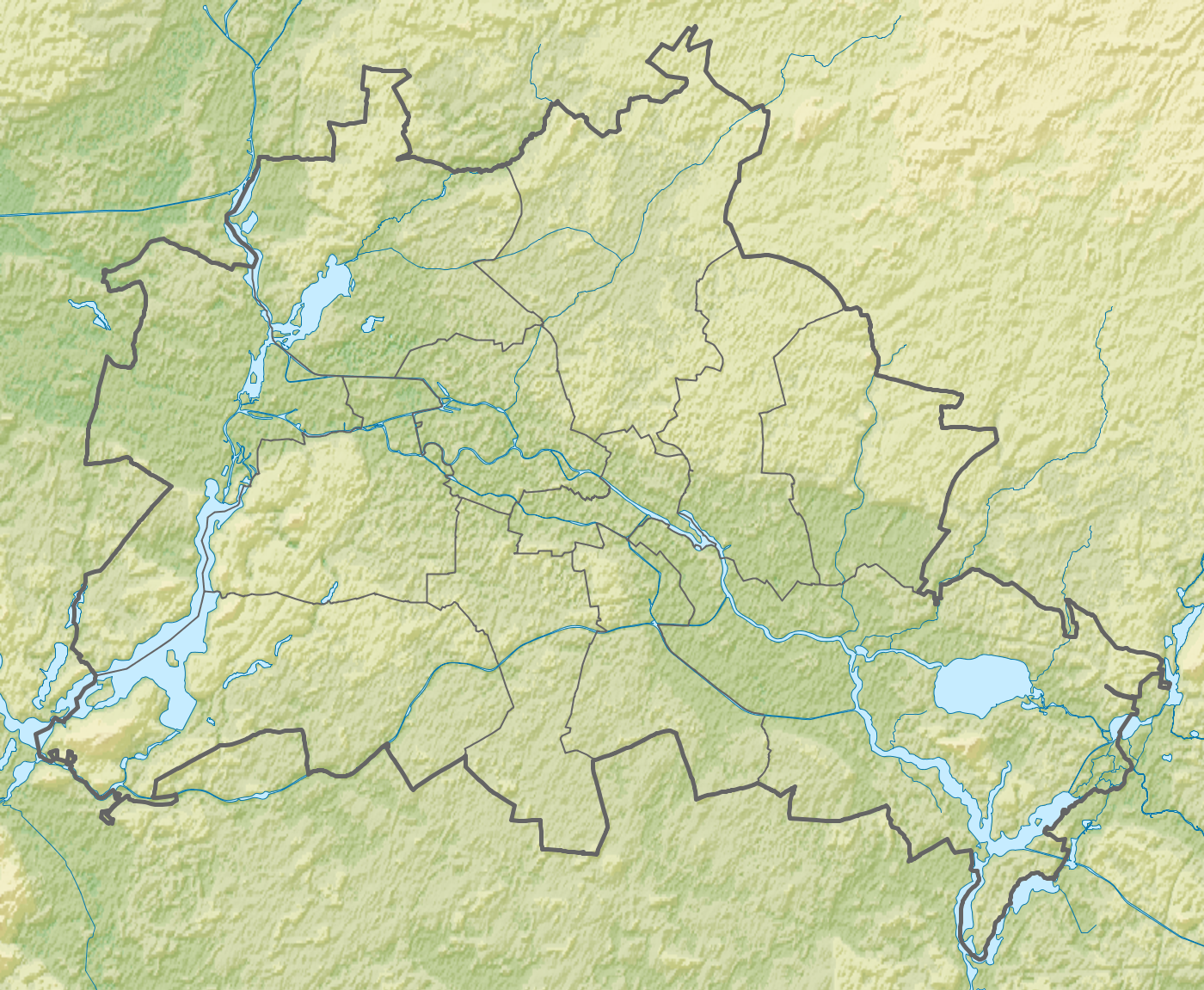
- Location within Berlin
- Type: Municipal park
- Location: Wilmersdorf, Berlin, Germany
- Coordinates: 52°29′1″N 13°19′27″E
- Area: 12.3 ha (30 acres)
- Created: 1912/13 (and later stages)
- Operator: Bezirksamt Charlottenburg-Wilmersdorf
- Status: Open all year

Volkspark Wilmersdorf is a public park in the Charlottenburg-Wilmersdorf borough of Berlin, Germany. Together with the adjacent Rudolph Wilde Park in Tempelhof-Schöneberg, it forms a linear green corridor about 2.5 km (1.6 mi) long and roughly 150 m (490 ft) wide across south-western Berlin. The Wilmersdorf section covers about 12.3 ha (30 acres) and includes the elongated Fennsee at its western end as well as sports fields near Bundesallee.

== History ==
Plans for a "Seepark" (lake park) in the low lying glacial channel were pursued from the late 19th century and placed under the direction of municipal head gardener Richard Thieme in 1904. Construction progressed in stages: parts were laid out in 1912/13; further sections were built up to 1920 and, after redesign, between 1933 and 1936. The former Wilmersdorfer See, once used for bathing, silted up and was finally filled in during the early 1920s; the area later hosted sports grounds.

During the interwar and Nazi era, the park was commonly referred to as Hindenburgpark. Contemporary plans and municipal materials from the 1920s–30s use that name, as well as the annual report of the Städtische Oberrealschule am Hindenburgpark (Municipal Upper Secondary School from the Hindenburg park), in 1933/34.

== Layout and features ==
The park consists of three sections divided by major streets. East of Bundesallee, the oldest part (1912/13) follows Thieme’s landscape design and includes large lawns, plantings and a major playground near the former RIAS building (today Deutschlandradio). A bright yellow pedestrian bridge, the Volksparksteg, completed in 1971, crosses Bundesallee and links the eastern and central parts. The central section contains sports fields on the site of the former lake, and the western section is arranged around the elongated Fennsee.

== Public art ==
Near the Volksparksteg stands the Speerwerfer (Javelin Thrower), a bronze statue by Karl Möbius dated 1921; the original was melted down in 1944 and a new cast was erected on the same spot in 1954. Other works in and around the park include the Sonnenuhr (Sundial) (1970) by Alfred Trenkel at Blissestraße and the sculpture Das Ding (The Thing) (1968) by Susanne Riée near Uhlandstraße.

== Use and access ==
The continuous green corridor is popular with walkers and runnerssince it is a roughly 2.5 km (1.6 mi) "green band" traversing two districts. Facilities include playgrounds, table-tennis tables, lawns and ball courts; a new themed "Zauberspielplatz" (magic playground) opened in May 2024 after refurbishment. In February 2025, glass shards were found and the playground was temporarily closed and then reopened after cleaning.

== Gallery ==
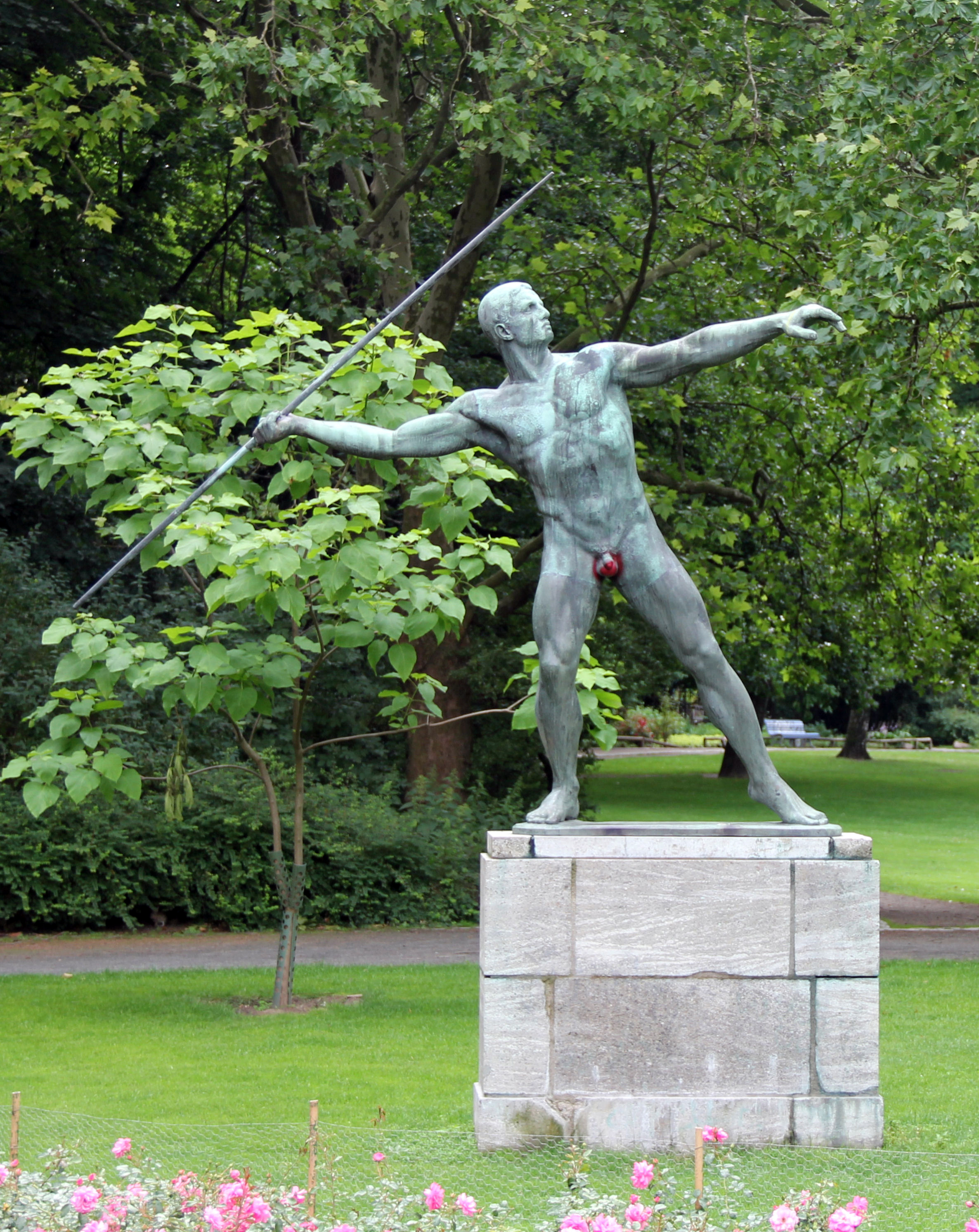
The Speerwerfer (Javelin Thrower) (1921/1954) by Karl Möbius.

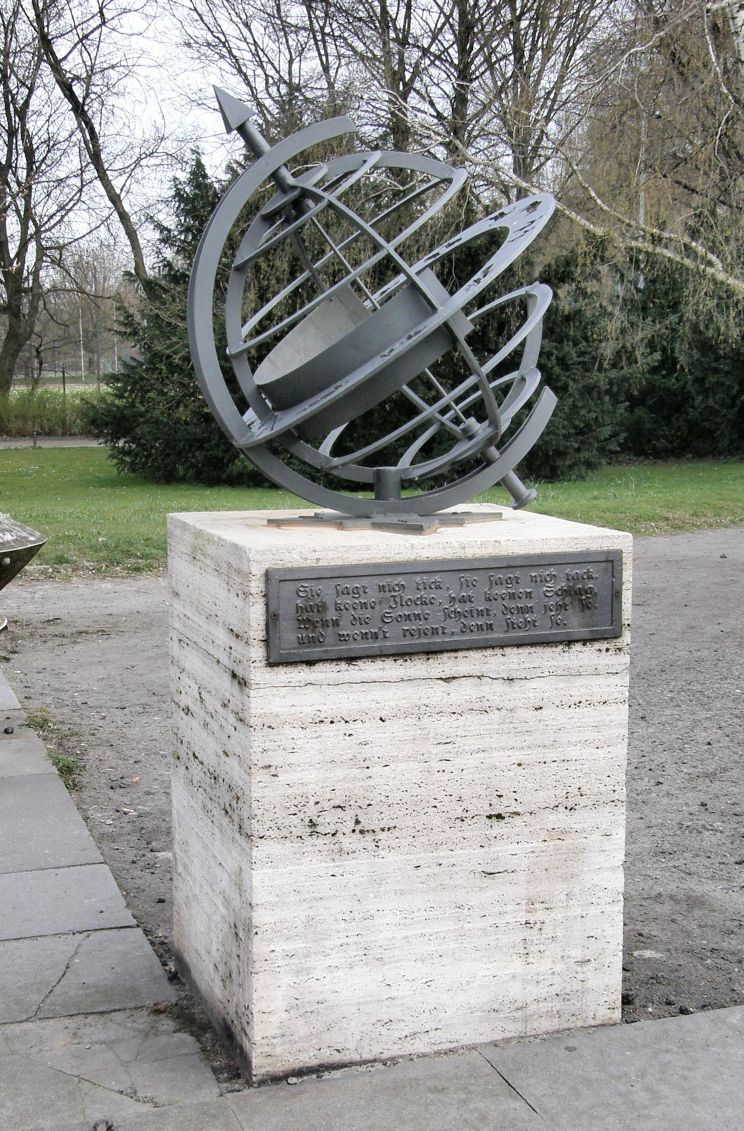
Sonnenuhr (Sundial) (1970) by Alfred Trenkel.

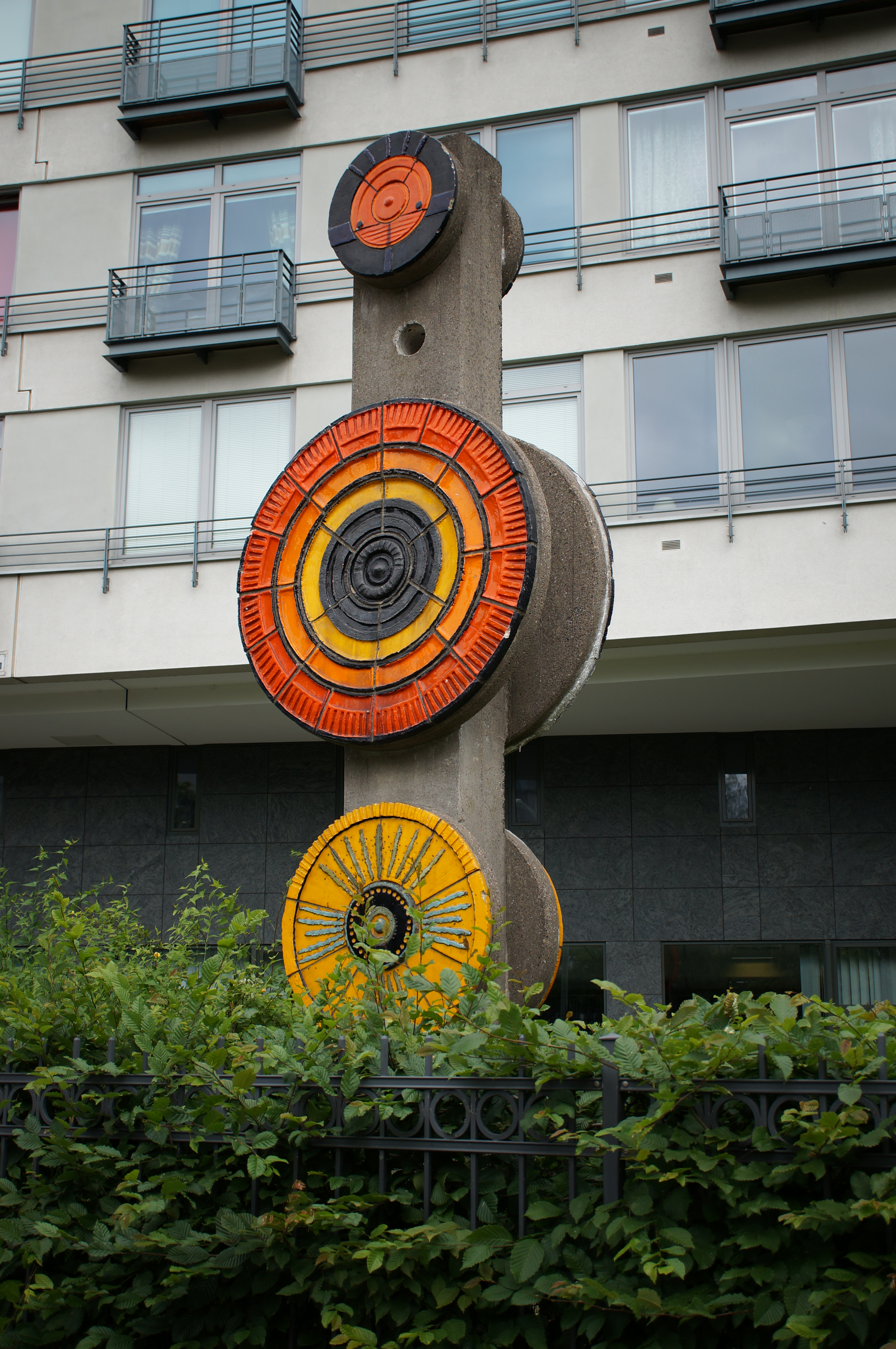
Das Ding (The Thing) (1968) by Susanne Riée.

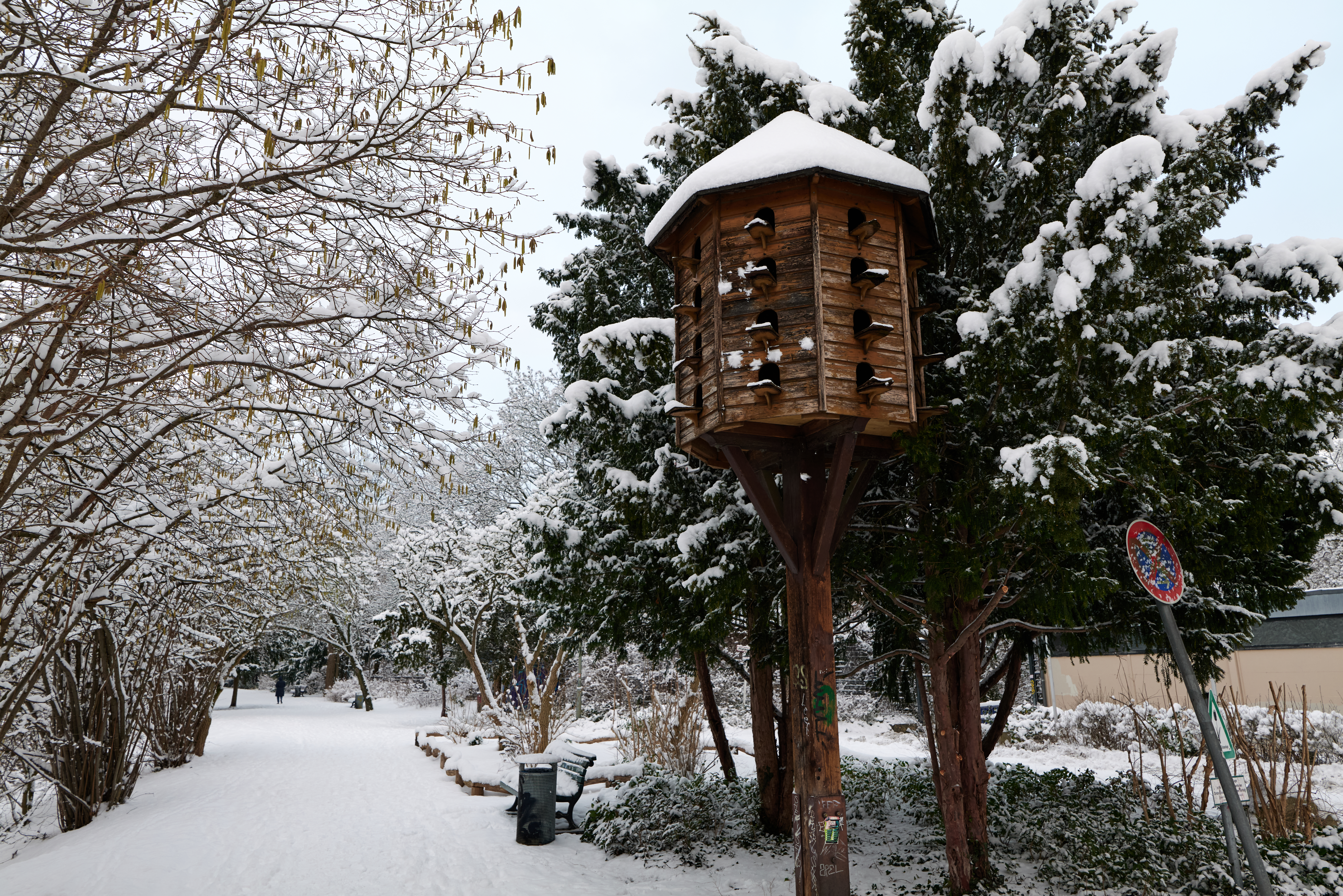
Dovecote in the park in winter, 2025.
