= Charlottenburg-Wilmersdorf =

- Borough of Berlin
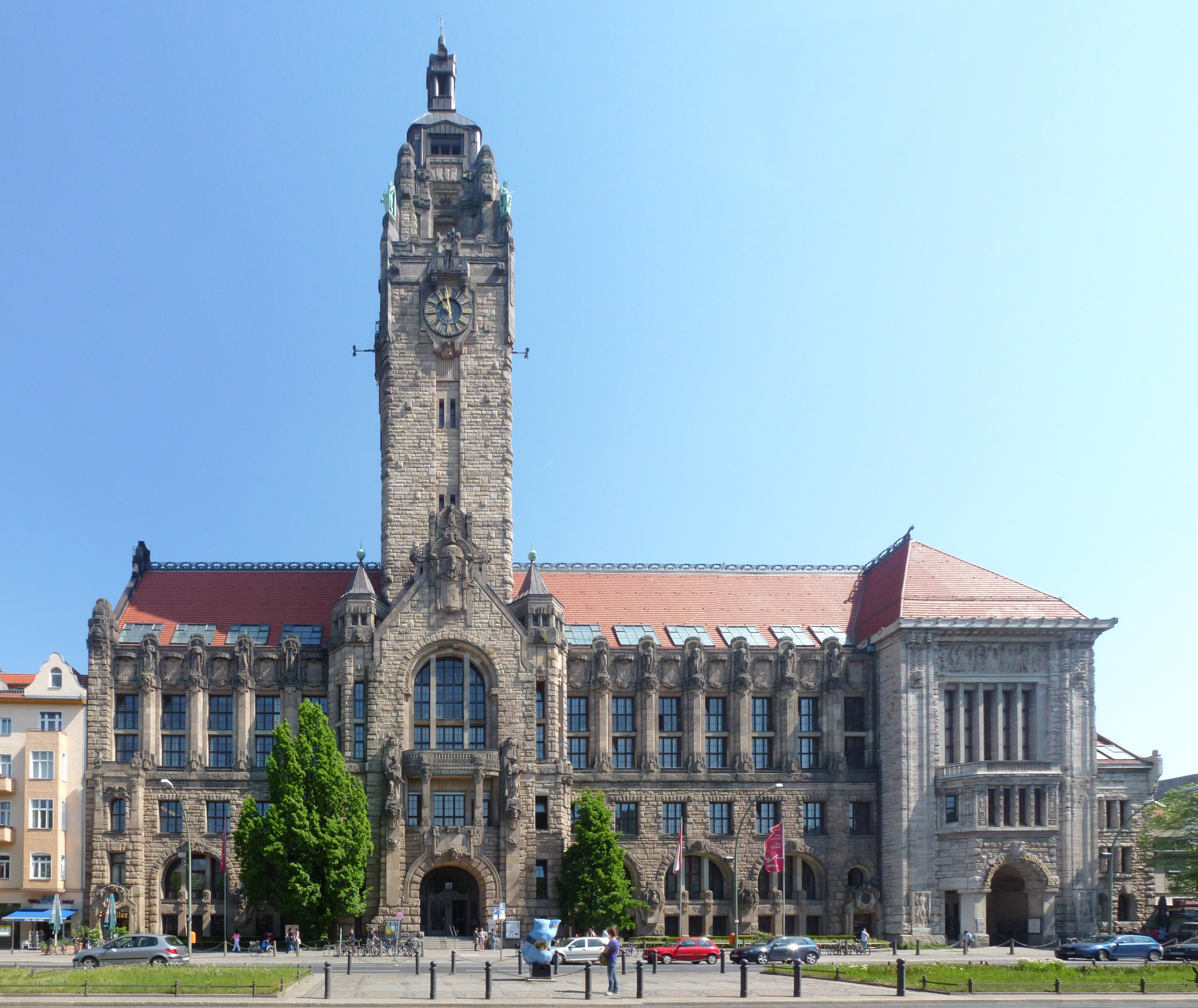
- Charlottenburg Town Hall

- Flag Coat of arms

- Location of Charlottenburg-Wilmersdorf in Berlin
- Interactive map of Charlottenburg-Wilmersdorf
- Location within Germany Location within Berlin
- Coordinates: 52°30′N 13°17′E
- Country: Germany
- State: Berlin
- City: Berlin
- Founded: 2001
- Subdivisions: 7 localities

Government
  - Mayor: Kirstin Bauch (Greens)

Area
  - Total: 64.72 km^{2} (24.99 sq mi)

Population (2024-12-31)
  - Total: 323,507
  - Density: 4,999/km^{2} (12,950/sq mi)
- Time zone: UTC+01:00 (CET)
  - Summer (DST): UTC+02:00 (CEST)
- Postal codes: 10585, 10587, 10589, 10623, 10625, 10627, 10629, 10707, 10709, 10711, 10713, 10715, 10717, 10719, 10777, 13627, 14050, 14052, 14053, 14055, 14057, 14059, 14193, 14197, 14199
- Dialling codes: 030
- Vehicle registration: B
- Website: www.berlin.de/ba-charlottenburg-wilmersdorf/

Charlottenburg-Wilmersdorf (German: [ʃaʁˌlɔtn̩bʊʁk ˈvɪlmɐsdɔʁf]) is the fourth borough of Berlin, formed in an administrative reform with effect from 1 January 2001, by merging the former boroughs of Charlottenburg and Wilmersdorf.

== Overview ==
Charlottenburg-Wilmersdorf covers the western city centre of Berlin and the adjacent affluent suburbs. It borders on the Mitte borough in the east, on Tempelhof-Schöneberg in the southeast, Steglitz-Zehlendorf in the south, Spandau in the west and on Reinickendorf in the north. The district includes the inner city localities of Charlottenburg, Wilmersdorf and Halensee.

After World War II and the city's division by the Berlin Wall, the area around Kurfürstendamm and Bahnhof Zoo was the centre of former West Berlin, with the Kaiser Wilhelm Memorial Church as its landmark. The Technische Universität Berlin, the Berlin University of the Arts (Universität der Künste), the Federal Institute for Risk Assessment (Bundesinstitut für Risikobewertung), the Deutsche Oper Berlin as well as Charlottenburg Palace and the Olympic Stadium are also located in Charlottenburg-Wilmersdorf.

== Demographics ==
As of 31 December 2025, the borough had a population of 343,625. Of these, 251,140 (73.1%) held German citizenship and 92,485 (26.9%) were foreign nationals. A total of 162,674 residents (47.3%) had a migration background, including 70,189 German citizens with a migration background and the 92,485 foreign nationals.

The average age of the borough's population was 45.2 years, the second highest among Berlin's twelve boroughs after Steglitz-Zehlendorf (46.6 years).

Population with and without migration background (31 December 2025)
Category	Number	Percentage
Total population	343,625	100%
Without migration background	180,951	52.7%
With migration background	162,674	47.3%
– German citizens with migration background	70,189	20.4%
– Foreign nationals	92,485	26.9%
Source: Amt für Statistik Berlin-Brandenburg, Statistischer Bericht A I 5 – hj 2/25.

The largest groups of residents with a migration background by country of origin were:

Largest groups by country of origin (31 December 2025)
Country of origin	Number	% of total population
Turkey	13,824	4.0%
Ukraine	11,756	3.4%
Poland	10,647	3.1%
Russia	8,911	2.6%
India	5,845	1.7%
Iran	5,193	1.5%
Italy	4,758	1.4%
United States	4,554	1.3%
Syria	4,442	1.3%
China	3,788	1.1%
France	3,575	1.0%
Romania	3,145	0.9%
Includes both foreign nationals and German citizens with migration background from the respective country. Source: Amt für Statistik Berlin-Brandenburg, Statistischer Bericht A I 5 – hj 2/25, Table 9.

== Subdivision ==
Charlottenburg-Wilmersdorf is divided into seven localities:

Subdivisions of Charlottenburg-Wilmersdorf

Locality	Area (km^{2})	Inhabitants; 31 December 2012	Density (inhabitants/km^{2})
0401 Charlottenburg	10.6	121,926	11,502
0402 Wilmersdorf	7.16	95,164	13,291
0403 Schmargendorf	3.59	20,476	5,704
0404 Grunewald	22.3	11,703	525
0405 Westend	13.5	38,944	2,885
0406 Charlottenburg-Nord	6.2	73,057	11,783
0407 Halensee	1.27	12,759	10,046

The localities of Schmargendorf and Grunewald were part of the former Wilmersdorf borough until 2001. By resolution of 30 September 2004, the localities of Westend and Charlottenburg-Nord were created on the territory of the former Charlottenburg borough, like Halensee on the territory of the former Wilmersdorf borough.

== Politics ==
=== District council ===
The governing body of Charlottenburg-Wilmersdorf is the district council (Bezirksverordnetenversammlung). It has responsibility for passing laws and electing the city government, including the mayor. The district council election held on 26 September 2021 was subsequently declared invalid by the Constitutional Court of Berlin due to widespread irregularities across Berlin, and a repeat election was held on 12 February 2023. In the repeat election, the CDU won the largest vote share with 30.7%, followed by Alliance 90/The Greens at 23.9% and the SPD at 19.8%; the CDU and Greens subsequently formed a Zählgemeinschaft (counting alliance), and Kirstin Bauch was confirmed as district mayor. The original September 2021 results were as follows:

Party	Lead candidate	Votes	%	+/-	Seats	+/-
Alliance 90/The Greens (Grüne)	Kirstin Bauch	42,720	24.7	▲4.9	15	▲3
Social Democratic Party (SPD)	Heike Schmitt-Schmelz	38,058	22.0	▼3.1	14	▼1
Christian Democratic Union (CDU)	Judith Stückler	37,883	21.9	▲0.3	13	±0
Free Democratic Party (FDP)	Stefanie Beckers	16,987	9.8	▼0.5	6	±0
The Left (LINKE)	Annetta Juckel	13,038	7.5	▼0.3	4	±0
Alternative for Germany (AfD)	Michael Seyfert	8,174	4.7	▼5.0	3	▼2
Tierschutzpartei		3,648	2.1	New	0	New
Volt Germany		3,245	1.9	New	0	New
Die PARTEI		2,681	1.5	0.0	0	±0
dieBasis		2,531	1.5	New	0	New
Free Voters		1,294	0.7	New	0	New
Klimaliste		813	0.5	New	0	New
Pirate Party Germany		589	0.4	▼1.2	0	±0
The Humanists		479	0.3	New	0	New
We are Berlin		430	0.2	New	0	New
Ecological Democratic Party		276	0.2	New	0	New
Liberal Conservative Reformers		136	0.1	New	0	New
Valid votes		173,082	99.2			
Invalid votes		1,360	0.8			
Total		174,442	100.0		55	±0
Electorate/voter turnout		246,148	70.9	▲7.9		
Source: Elections Berlin

=== District government ===
The district mayor (Bezirksbürgermeister) is elected by the Bezirksverordnetenversammlung, and positions in the district government (Bezirksamt) are apportioned based on party strength. Kirstin Bauch of the Greens was first elected mayor on 16 December 2021. Following the 2023 repeat election and the formation of a CDU-Green Zählgemeinschaft, the Bezirksamt was reconstituted in April 2023: the CDU increased its representation from two to three seats, taking the urban development portfolio from the SPD, and the deputy mayor position passed from the SPD to the CDU. In May 2025, Stadtrat Detlef Wagner (CDU) was recalled by the BVV, and in June 2025, Stadtrat Arne Herz (CDU) left the Bezirksamt after being appointed State Secretary for Mobility and Transport in the Berlin Senate. Two replacement members were elected by the BVV on 17 July 2025. The current composition of the district government is as follows:

Councillor	Party	Portfolio
Kirstin Bauch	GRÜNE	District Mayor; Finance, Staff and Economic Development
Christoph Brzezinski	CDU	Deputy Mayor; Urban Development, Property and IT
Heike Schmitt-Schmelz	SPD	Education, Sport and Culture
Oliver Schruoffeneger	GRÜNE	Order, Environment, Roads and Green Spaces
Simon Hertel	CDU	Youth and Health
Astrid Duda	CDU	Civil Service and Social Affairs
Source: Berlin.de

== Twin towns – sister cities ==
Charlottenburg-Wilmersdorf is twinned with:

- Apeldoorn, Netherlands (1968)
- Bad Iburg, Germany (1980)
- Belváros-Lipótváros (Budapest), Hungary (1998)
- Forchheim (district), Germany (1991)
- Gagny, France (1992)
- Gladsaxe, Denmark (1968)
- Karmiel, Israel (1985)
- Kulmbach (district), Germany (1991)
- Lewisham, England, United Kingdom (1968)
- Linz, Austria (1995)
- Mannheim, Germany (1962)
- Marburg-Biedenkopf, Germany (1991)
- Międzyrzecz, Poland (1993)
- Minden, Germany (1968)
- Or Yehuda, Israel (1966)
- Pechersk (Kyiv), Ukraine (1991)
- Rheingau-Taunus (district), Germany (1991)
- Split, Croatia (1970)
- Sutton, England, United Kingdom (1968)
- Trento, Italy (1966)
- Waldeck-Frankenberg, Germany (1988)

== Economy ==
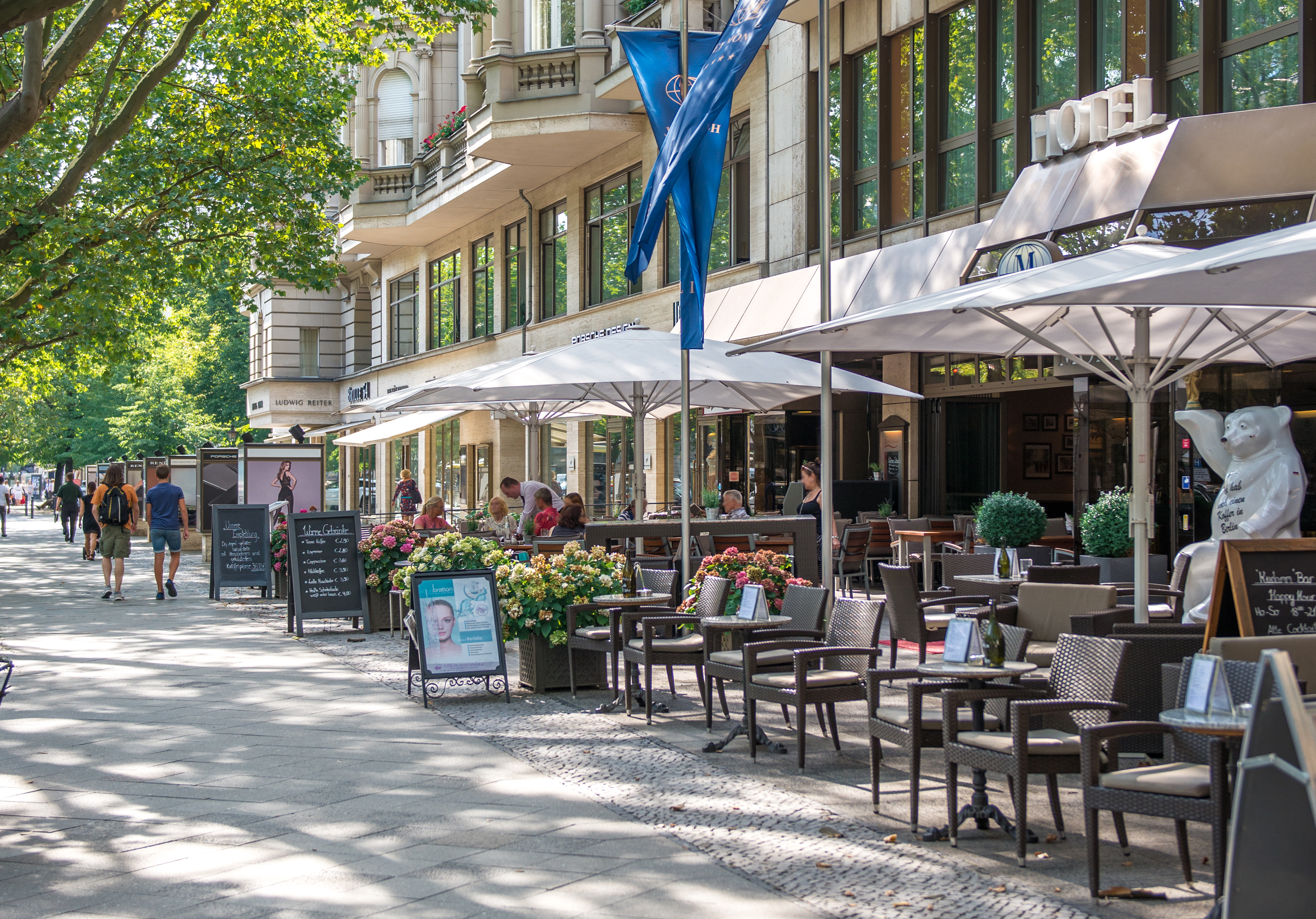
Kurfürstendamm is one of the most famous avenues in Berlin.

The borough's economy largely depends on retail trade, mainly in the City West area along Kurfürstendamm, Breitscheidplatz and Tauentzienstraße, with supra-local importance. Among the shopping malls in the area are Bikini-Berlin, and the Europa-Center.

The Berliner Börse (Berlin Stock Exchange) is housed in the Ludwig-Erhard-Haus designed by Nicholas Grimshaw at Fasanenstraße 85 in Berlin-Charlottenburg near Bahnhof Zoologischer Garten.

The Royal Porcelain Factory in Berlin (German: Königliche Porzellan-Manufaktur Berlin) (KPM) is also situated in Charlottenburg, near Berlin-Tiergarten Station.

The Messe Berlin (Exhibition Grounds/Trade Fair Center) is situated in Berlin-Westend.

The former headquarters of Air Berlin (ceased operations 2017) and Germania (ceased operations 2019) were located in Charlottenburg-Nord.

== Education ==
There are 74 schools in the city. There are 29,446 students attending these schools, 5,261 are foreigners. Of these, 12,993 study in 38 primary schools while 9,617 attend the district's 14 Gymnasiums. There are also 3 Hauptschule and 6 Realschule in Charlottenburg-Wilmersdorf.

The district also has two universities, Technische Universität Berlin and Berlin University of the Arts. In 2011, Technische Universität Berlin was named the 46th best university in the world in engineering and technology according to the QS World University Rankings.

=== Higher education ===
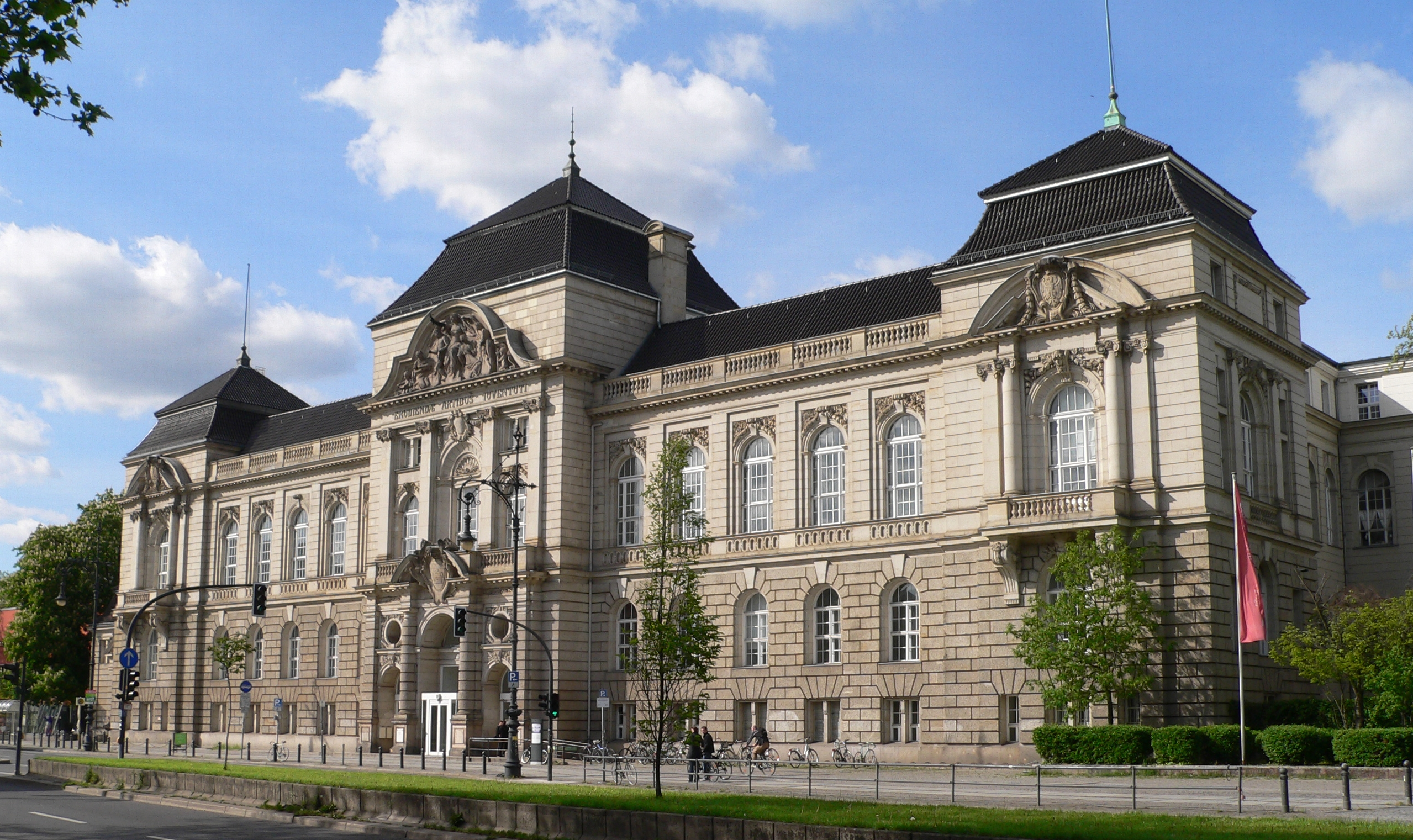
- Berlin University of the Arts
  Universität der Künste (Berlin University of the Arts)
- Technische Universität Berlin
- Bbw University of Applied Sciences
- ESCP Business School
- Touro College Berlin

=== Primary and secondary schools ===
- Comenius-Schule, a primary school, is in Wilmersdorf.
- Halensee-Grundschule, a primary school, is in Halensee.
- Jüdische Traditionsschule, traditionell Jewish primary and secondary school in Westend
- Heinz-Galinski-Schule Charlottenburg, Jewish primary school
- Svenska Skolan Berlin, Swedish School Berlin
- Nelson-Mandela-School, International School
- Goethe-Gymnasium, one of the most popular secondary schools in Berlin
- Peter-Ustinov-Schule, located between Messe Nord and Wilmersdorfer Straße.
- Evangelisches Gymnasium zum Grauen Kloster, School of the Evangelical Church
- Schiller-Gymnasium-Berlin, located at Ernst-Reuter-Platz

=== Weekend education ===
- The Japanische Ergänzungsschule in Berlin e.V. (ベルリン日本語補習授業校 Berurin Nihongo Hoshū Jugyō Kō), a weekend Japanese supplementary school, is held at Halensee-Grundschule.
- Zentrale Schule für Japanisch Berlin e.V. (共益法人ベルリン中央学園補習授業校 Kyōeki Hōjin Berurin Chūō Gakuen Hoshū Jugyō Kō), another weekend Japanese supplementary school, is held at the Comenius-Schule – Established April 1997.

== See also ==
- Berlin-Charlottenburg-Wilmersdorf (electoral district)
- Berlin-Spandau – Charlottenburg North (electoral district)
