= Kaptanganj Junction railway station =

Railway Station in Uttar Pradesh, India

Kaptanganj Junction

General information
- Location: State Highway 64, Kaptanganj, Kushinagar district, Uttar Pradesh; India
- Coordinates: 26.9255°N 83.6993°E
- Elevation: 89 metres (292 ft)
- System: Indian Railways station
- Owner: Indian Railways
- Operator: North Eastern
- Lines: Muzaffarpur–Gorakhpur main line via Narkatiaganj Muzaffarpur–Gorakhpur line (via Hajipur, Raxaul and Sitamarhi); Kaptanganj - Siwan Line
- Platforms: 3 (2 platform under construction)
- Tracks: 4

Construction
- Structure type: Standard (on-ground station)
- Parking: Yes
- Cycle facilities: No

Other information
- Status: Active
- Station code: CPJ
- Zone(s): North Eastern
- Division(s): Varanasi

History
- Opened: 1907; 119 years ago
Location
- Location within India Location within Uttar Pradesh

Kaptanganj Junction railway station is a railway junction located in the Kushinagar district of Uttar Pradesh, India. Its station code is CPJ. The station serves the town of Kaptanganj and nearby rural areas and is the most important railway station in Kushinagar district, acting as a major rail junction for passenger movement and regional connectivity.

The station consists of three operational platforms, with two additional platforms under construction. The platforms are not well sheltered, and the station lacks several passenger amenities, including adequate drinking water and sanitation facilities.

The Siwan–Kaptanganj line was opened between 1907 and 1913. The doubling work survey for Muzaffarpur–Gorakhpur main line was sanctioned in the Railway Budget of 2012–13.

The East Central Railway zone also applied for the electrification of the following sections to the Ministry of Railways (India) for the Rail Budget 2015–16. The doubling work survey for "Muzaffarpur–Gorakhpur main line" was sanctioned in the Railway Budget of 2012–13.

The East Central Railway zone also applied for the electrification of the following sections to the Ministry of Railways (India) for the Rail Budget 2015–16.

Kaptanganj Junction railway station (station code: CPJ) is a railway station serving the town of Kaptanganj in the Kushinagar district of the Indian state of Uttar Pradesh. The station is operated by Indian Railways under the North Eastern Railway zone. It serves as an important railhead for Kaptanganj and surrounding rural areas.

== Location ==
Kaptanganj Junction is located in Kaptanganj town along State Highway 64. The station provides rail connectivity to various parts of eastern Uttar Pradesh and neighbouring regions of Bihar.

== History ==
The railway line between Siwan and Kaptanganj was opened between 1907 and 1913 during the early expansion of railways in the region. Over time, the station developed into a junction due to its strategic location connecting Uttar Pradesh and Bihar.

A survey for doubling of the Muzaffarpur–Gorakhpur main line was sanctioned in the Railway Budget of 2012–13.

== Infrastructure ==
Kaptanganj Junction is a standard on-ground railway station. The station has three operational platforms, with two additional platforms under construction. It has four railway tracks. Parking facilities are available at the station.

== Lines and connectivity ==
The station lies on the following railway lines:

- Muzaffarpur–Gorakhpur railway line (via Narkatiaganj)
- Muzaffarpur–Gorakhpur route via Hajipur, Raxaul, and Sitamarhi
- Kaptanganj–Siwan railway line

These lines connect the station to cities such as Gorakhpur, Siwan, Muzaffarpur, and other regional centres.

== Electrification ==
Railway sections connected to Kaptanganj Junction were proposed for electrification as part of development plans submitted to the Ministry of Railways for the Railway Budget 2015–16. Electrification of connected routes has improved operational efficiency.

== Passenger amenities ==
The station provides basic passenger facilities such as ticket counters and waiting areas. However, platform shelters are limited, and amenities such as drinking water and sanitation facilities are inadequate.

== Importance ==
Kaptanganj Junction is one of the most important railway stations in Kushinagar district. It plays a key role in passenger transportation for Kaptanganj town and nearby villages and supports regional connectivity between eastern Uttar Pradesh and Bihar. The station also facilitates the movement of agricultural produce from surrounding rural areas.
