= Bucharest Business Week =

Bucharest Business Week (BBW for short) was a Romanian English-language weekly business newspaper. It was published by AmeriCelt Publishing SRL, the Bucharest branch of Romanian Ventures Inc. based in the United States. The readership was approximately 24,000.

It contained various categories of business news, about companies, privatization or investment. The newspaper also featured Romania-related news and interviews.
