= Bbw University of Applied Sciences =

University in Berlin

bbw Hochschule - University of Applied Sciences
- bbw Hochschule
- Established: 2007
- Location: Wagner-Régeny-Straße 21, 12489 Berlin; 52°26′13″N 13°32′4″E
- Campus: Urban
- Website: www.bbw-hochschule.de/Home.html

- Location within Berlin

bbw Hochschule is a private, state-recognized university of applied sciences in Berlin, Germany. Founded in 2007, it is based in Berlin-Adlershof and offers bachelor's and master's degree programmes in fields including business, economics, engineering and related interdisciplinary areas.

== History ==
The bbw Hochschule was founded in Berlin in 2007. The Wissenschaftsrat, Germany's main advisory body on science and higher education policy, institutionally accredited the university for the first time in 2011 and re-accredited it in 2015.

In 2015, the university also completed its first system accreditation procedure, with FIBAA acting as the accreditation agency. In 2020, the Wissenschaftsrat re-accredited the university for a further five years. In its assessment, it noted the further development of the university's degree programmes and the expansion of its research activities, while also attaching conditions concerning governance and staffing.

After 15 years at its founding location in Berlin-Charlottenburg, the university moved to a new campus in Berlin-Adlershof in 2023. The new location is situated in the Adlershof Science and Technology Park.

== Organization ==
bbw Hochschule is a private university of applied sciences with state recognition. It is operated by the non-profit bbw Akademie für Betriebswirtschaftliche Weiterbildung GmbH. The sole shareholder of the bbw Akademie is the bbw Bildungswerk der Wirtschaft in Berlin und Brandenburg e.V., which is supported by industry and business associations in the Berlin-Brandenburg region. The university is part of the broader bbw Group.

The university's academic activities are organized into three subject groups: economics and business, industrial engineering, and engineering.

The university's central governance bodies have historically included the Hochschulleitung, the Academic Senate and the Kuratorium. Following the adoption of a new Grundordnung in 2024, the former Rektorat was renamed the Präsidium. The university's executive leadership comprises a president, two vice-presidents responsible for teaching and research, and a chancellor responsible for administrative and financial matters.

== Rectors and Presidents ==
Since its founding, bbw Hochschule has been led by a Rektor, a title renamed Präsident following the university's 2024 Grundordnung. The following individuals have held the position:

Term	Title	Name
2007-2010	Gründungrektor	Prof. Dr. Gerhard Hörber
2010-2012	Rektor	Prof. Dr. Herbert Grüner
2012-2024	Rektor	Prof. Dr.-Ing. Gebhard Hafer
2024	Rektor	Prof. Dr.-Ing. Robert Dust
2024-2026	Präsident	Prof. Dr.-Ing. Robert Dust
2026-Present	Präsident (kommissarisch)	Prof. Dr.-Ing. René Brunotte

== Campus ==
bbw Hochschule is located in Berlin-Adlershof at Wagner-Régeny-Straße 21, within the Berlin-Adlershof Science and Technology Park. The university began teaching at the site in April 2023 after relocating from its former campus in Berlin-Charlottenburg, where it had been based since its founding.

The campus occupies premises in the OFFICE LAB CAMPUS. The site is located near Berlin-Adlershof station and is served by the Berlin S-Bahn, tram and bus networks.

The campus includes teaching and study facilities as well as a library and digital learning infrastructure. The university's library provides reading and study spaces and access to additional academic resources through cooperation with Berlin libraries.

== Research ==
The university's research activities are coordinated by the fib Research Institute, which was established in 2011 to strengthen the connection between research and teaching and to expand and coordinate third-party-funded research. The institute focuses on application-oriented research, knowledge and technology transfer, and the publication of research results.

In its early years, research at the university focused particularly on engineering and the transfer of scientific knowledge into professional practice. The university also pursued interdisciplinary research, including work in the field of e-mobility.

The university's research activities expanded during the following accreditation period. In its 2020 re-accreditation, the Wissenschaftsrat noted a recognizable increase in the university's research performance and acknowledged the research-support measures it had introduced.

Research activities currently span the university's subject areas of economics and business, industrial engineering, and engineering. Projects have addressed areas including real estate, healthcare and telemedicine, logistics, digital health and technical education. The fib also involves students in research projects and links research results with teaching.

The institute coordinates third-party-funded research projects in cooperation with companies and other partners and publishes periodic research reports. Among its completed projects is the Health Reality Lab Network (HLaN), a federally funded project on the development and evaluation of digital-health applications that ran from 2018 to 2021.

== Accreditation ==
bbw Hochschule has been state-recognized as a private university of applied sciences since its foundation in 2007. The Wissenschaftsrat institutionally accredited the university for the first time in 2011 and re-accredited it in 2015. In 2020, the Wissenschaftsrat granted a further institutional re-accreditation for five years, subject to conditions concerning the university's governance structure and staffing.

In 2015, bbw Hochschule received its first system accreditation from the Accreditation Council. The procedure assessed the university's internal quality-management system and was conducted with FIBAA as the accreditation agency.

The university's system accreditation was renewed in 2024 and is valid until 31 March 2030. The renewed procedure again assessed the university's internal quality-management system and was accompanied by FIBAA. System accreditation allows degree programmes established or internally reviewed according to the accredited quality-assurance system to undergo accreditation through the university's own procedures.

== Curriculum ==
bbw Hochschule offers Bachelor's and Master's degree programmes in three academic areas: business and economics, industrial engineering, and engineering. As of 2026, the university lists 19 degree programmes.

The business-oriented programmes cover areas including business administration and management, real estate, digital business and e-commerce, media and event management, logistics, and technology transfer. Engineering programmes include electrical engineering, railway technology, mechanical engineering, mechatronics and technical asset management. The university also offers a Bachelor's programme in industrial engineering.

Several Master's programmes are taught in English, including programmes in strategic logistics management, international technology transfer management, and sustainability and smart building technology.

Depending on the programme, students can study full-time, part-time alongside employment, or in a dual-study format combining academic study with practical work.

The current programme portfolio has expanded since the Wissenschaftsrat's 2020 assessment, which recorded eight Bachelor's and five Master's programmes.

== Tuition fees and Financing ==
As a private university, bbw Hochschule charges tuition fees, with the amount depending on the degree programme. Current fees are specified in the respective study contracts and programme information. The university offers various financing options, including payment arrangements and information on state financial support such as BAföG.

Students can also apply for the Deutschlandstipendium, which normally provides €300 per month and can be combined with BAföG. For dual-study programmes, tuition fees are in most cases covered by the practical partner, while students receive remuneration.

== Internationalization ==
bbw Hochschule has an International Office responsible for supporting international students and coordinating international mobility. The university offers several English-taught Master's programmes and recruits students internationally.

bbw Hochschule also maintains academic partnerships with universities outside Germany and participates in international research and academic-exchange projects. Its international activities include cooperation with institutions in Europe, Asia and Africa, as well as joint teaching and research initiatives.
