= Kaptanganj, India =

Kaptanganj
- Town
- Location in Uttar Pradesh, India Kaptanganj (India)
- Coordinates: 26.93°N 83.72°E
- Country: India
- State: Uttar Pradesh
- District: Kushinagar
- Elevation: 76 m (249 ft)

Population (2011)
  - Total: 23,526

Languages
  - Official: Hindi
- Time zone: UTC+5:30 (IST)
- PIN: 274301
- Telephone code: +91 5567
- Vehicle registration: UP57
- Website: kushinagar.nic.in

Kaptanganj is a town, a tehsil, and a Nagar Panchayat located in the Kushinagar district of Uttar Pradesh, India. It is situated in the eastern part of the state, close to the Uttar Pradesh–Bihar border, and serves as an important local administrative, commercial, and transport centre for surrounding rural areas.

== Overview ==
- Country: India
- State: Uttar Pradesh
- District: Kushinagar
- Settlement type: Town / Nagar Panchayat
- Coordinates: 26.93°N 83.72°E
- Elevation: 76 m (249 ft)
- Population (2011): 23,526
- Sex ratio: 894 females per 1,000 males (2011)
- Literacy rate: 59.04% (2011)
- Official language: Hindi
- Regional language: Bhojpuri
- Time zone: UTC+5:30 (IST)
- PIN: 274301
- Telephone code: +91 5567
- Vehicle registration: UP57
- Governing body: Nagar Panchayat
- Railway station: Kaptanganj Junction
- Website: kushinagar.nic.in

== Geography ==
Kaptanganj is located in the alluvial plains of eastern Uttar Pradesh. The region is largely flat and fertile, supporting agriculture as the primary land use. The town lies along State Highway 64, which provides road connectivity to nearby towns and villages within Kushinagar district and adjoining areas.

The climate of Kaptanganj is subtropical, with hot summers, a monsoon season from June to September, and cool winters.

== Administration ==
Kaptanganj is administered as a Nagar Panchayat under the Kushinagar district administration. It also functions as a tehsil headquarters. The town is divided into municipal wards, represented by elected members.

Kaptanganj falls under the Kaptanganj Assembly constituency and the Kushinagar Lok Sabha constituency.

== Demographics ==
According to the 2001 Census of India, Kaptanganj had a population of 11,493. Hindi is the official language, while Bhojpuri is widely spoken as a regional language. The population consists of people from different religious and social communities.

== Economy ==
The economy of Kaptanganj is mainly based on agriculture and small-scale trade. Agricultural produce such as rice, wheat, sugarcane, pulses, and vegetables are traded in local markets. The town also supports retail businesses, transport services, and small commercial establishments serving nearby villages.

== Transport ==
Kaptanganj is connected by road and rail. The town is served by Kaptanganj Junction railway station, which connects it to major cities in eastern Uttar Pradesh and Bihar. Road transport includes state and private buses, auto-rickshaws, and other local transport services.

== Education ==
Educational facilities in Kaptanganj include government and private primary schools, secondary schools, and intermediate colleges. For higher education Dadi Rajmati Devi Mahila Mahavidyalaya very famous college, students generally travel to nearby towns and cities such as Padrauna, Deoria, and Gorakhpur.

== Healthcare ==
The town has basic healthcare facilities, including government health centres and private clinics. For specialised medical treatment, residents depend on district and regional hospitals.

== Culture ==
Kaptanganj reflects the cultural traditions of eastern Uttar Pradesh. Festivals such as Diwali, Holi, Chhath, Eid, and Muharram are celebrated by the local population.

== Demographics ==
As of the 2011 census, Kaptanganj has a population of 23,526. Males constitute 53% of the population and females 47%. Kaptanganj has an average literacy rate of 59%, lower than the national average of 74%. In Kaptanganj, roughly 13% of the population is under the age of 6.

It was announced as a town area in 1911 by the British Raj. Major places are Arya Nagar (Mangal Bazar), Chandani Chowk, Subhash Chowk, Azad Chowk and Shiva Chowk.

== Transportation ==
The town is connected to many important cities with National Highway 28B and State Highway No. 64. The proposed Buddha Expressway between Kushinagar and Sarnath will provide connectivity with south eastern cities of the state like Varanasi, Allahabad, Azamgarh as well as Kolkata through National Highway 2 in Varanasi.

Kaptanganj Railway Station is on a broad gauge railway that connects to major cities of the country. Currently, trains running between Gorakhpur and Thawe originate here. It is expected to be a part of the proposed Kushinagar International Airport.
