= Pipraich =

Pipraich Gorakhpur
- Town
- Location in Uttar Pradesh, India
- Coordinates: 26.83°N 83.53°E
- Country: India
- State: Uttar Pradesh
- District: Gorakhpur
- Elevation: 71 m (233 ft)

Population (2001)
  - Total: 125,762

Languages
  - Official: Bhojpuri, Hindi
- Time zone: UTC+5:30 (IST)
- Postal code: 273152

Pipraich is a town and a nagar panchayat in Gorakhpur district in the Indian state of Uttar Pradesh. The Pipraich block comes under the tehsil Sadar. It was declared a town on 25 November 1871, under the Bengal Chaukidari Act, of 1856 and is now administered as a town area under the U.P. Town Areas Act of 1914.

== History ==
It was declared a town on 25 November 1871, under the Bengal Chaukidari Act, of 1856 and is now administered as a town area under the U.P. Town Areas Act of 1914. The Town covers an area of 2.8 km^{2}. and had a population of 7,162 in 1971. The town area committee consists of 11 members including the chairman, all elected by its inhabitants for a term of four years. This period can, however, be extended by government in special cases.

The total income and expenditure of the committee was Rs 90,422 and Rs 1,05,710 respectively in 1973-74. The town has its own waterworks, commissioned in 1971. There were 129 water taps with 2,438 m of pipelines in 1971. Electricity became available for street lighting in the town in 1962. There were 40 electric street lamps in 1972–73. The committee also makes arrangements for the cleansing of roads, streets and drains in the town.

== Geography ==
Pipraich is located at 26.83°N 83.53°E. It has an average elevation of 71 metres (232 feet). It is located 20 km north-east of Gorakhpur city. The Gorakhpur airport is located at distance of 15 km from Pipraich town.

== Demographics ==
As of 2001 India census, Pipraich (Town) had a population of 1,25,762. Males constitute 52% of the population and females 48%. Pipraich has an average literacy rate of 61%, higher than the national average of 59.5%: male literacy is 70%, and female literacy is 51%. In Pipraich, 15% of the population is under 6 years of age.

== Police and administration ==
The Pipraich block have its own police station. The Development Block Pipraich was inaugurated on 1 April 1960. The Pipraich block is under Lok Sabha Kshetra 38- Gorakhpur and Vidhan Sabha Kshetra 321- Pipraich.

== Political representation ==
| Year | Name of constituency | Name of member | Party |
|---|---|---|---|
| 2017 | Pipraich | Mahendra Pal Singh (Sainthwar) | BJP |
| 2012 | Pipraich | Rajmati Nishad | SP |
| 2011 | Pipraich | Rajmati Nishad | SP |
| 2007 | Pipraich | Jamuna Nishad | BSP |
| 2002 | Pipraich | Jitendra Kr Jaiswal | IND |
| 1996 | Pipraich | Jitendra Kr Jaiswal | IND |
| 1993 | Pipraich | Jitendra Kr Jaiswal | IND |
| 1991 | Pipraich | Lallan Prasad Tripathi | BJP |
| 1989 | Pipraich | Kedar Nath Singh Sainthwar | JD |
| 1985 | Pipraich | Sayed Javed Ali | INC |
| 1980 | Pipraich | Kedar Nath Singh Sainthwar | INC(U) |
| 1977 | Pipraich | Madhukar Dighe | JNP |
| 1974 | Pipraich | Madhukar Dighe | BKD |
| 1969 | Pipraich | Hari Prasad Shahi | INC |
| 1967 | Pipraich | Madhukar Dighe | SSP |
| 1962 | Pipraich | Achhaibar Singh Sainthwar | INC |
| 1957 | Pipraich | Achhaibar Singh Sainthwar | INC |

| Year | Kshetra Panchayat | Pramukh |
|---|---|---|
| 2010 | Pipraich | Anand Singh Shahi |

=== UP state election 2007 ===
No of electors: 2,80,117
Polling %age: 48.16%

== Transport ==
Pipraich is well connected by rail and road. The Pipraich railway station is located north east of Gorakhpur. It comes under the North Eastern Railway zone. The Pipraich railway station code is PPC.
