= Jaynagar–Patna Intercity Express =

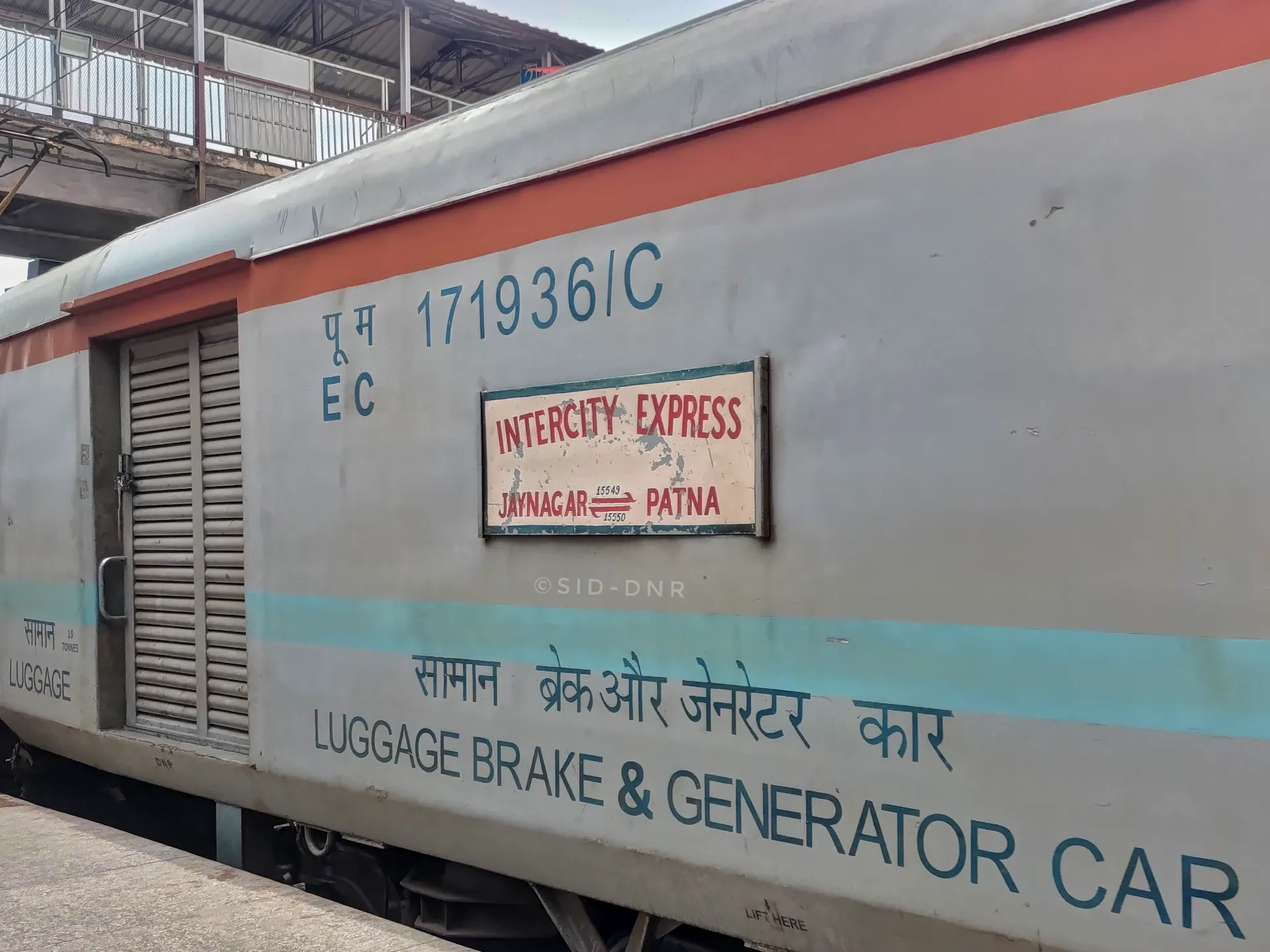

Overview
- Service type: Intercity
- First service: 13 August 2017; 8 years ago
- Current operator: East Central Railway zone

Route
- Termini: Jaynagar (JYG); Patna Junction (PNBE)
- Stops: 8
- Distance travelled: 244 km (152 mi)
- Average journey time: 7h 40m
- Service frequency: Except Saturday (Note: Runs six days in a week for every direction.)
- Train number: 15549/15550

On-board services
- Classes: AC Chair Car, General Unreserved
- Seating arrangements: Yes
- Sleeping arrangements: No
- Catering facilities: No
- Observation facilities: ICF coach
- Entertainment facilities: No
- Baggage facilities: No
- Other facilities: Below the seats

Technical
- Rolling stock: 1
- Track gauge: 1,676 mm (5 ft 6 in)
- Operating speed: 32 km/h (20 mph), including halts

The Jaynagar–Patna Intercity Express is an Intercity train belonging to East Central Railway zone that runs between Patna Junction and Jaynagar in India. It is currently being operated with 15549/15550 train numbers on a weekly basis.

== Service ==
The 15549/Jayanagar Patna Intercity Express has an average speed of 29 km/h and covers 244 km in 8h 30m. The 15550/Patna Jaynagar Intercity Express has an average speed of 32 km/h and covers 244 km in 7h 30m.

== Route and halts ==
The important halts of the train are:

- Jaynagar
- Madhubani
- Sakri Junction
- Darbhanga Junction
- Samastipur Junction
- Muzaffarpur Junction
- Hajipur Junction
- Sonpur Junction
- Patliputra Junction
- Patna Junction

== Coach composition ==
The train has standard ICF rakes with a maximum speed of 110 km/h. The train consists of 11 coaches:

- 1 AC Chair Car
- 8 General Unreserved
- 2 Seating cum Luggage Rake

== Traction ==
Both trains are hauled by a Samastipur Loco Shed-based WDM-3A/WDM-3D diesel locomotive from Jainagar to Patna and vice versa.

== Direction reversal ==
The train reverses its direction 1 times:

- Samastipur Junction

== See also ==
- Jaynagar railway station
- Jaynagar–Rajendra Nagar Terminal Intercity Express
- Patna Junction railway station
