= Kolkata–Jaynagar Weekly Express =

Train route in India

Overview
- Service type: Express
- First service: 7 July 2012; 14 years ago
- Current operator: Eastern Railway zone

Route
- Termini: Kolkata (KOAA); Jaynagar (JYG)
- Stops: 15
- Distance travelled: 619 km (385 mi)
- Average journey time: 14h 5m
- Service frequency: Weekly (Note: Runs one day in a week for every direction.)
- Train number: 13135/13136

On-board services
- Classes: AC III Tier, AC III Tier, Sleeper coaches, General Unreserved
- Seating arrangements: No
- Sleeping arrangements: Yes
- Catering facilities: On-board catering E-catering
- Observation facilities: LHB coach
- Entertainment facilities: No
- Baggage facilities: No
- Other facilities: Below the seats

Technical
- Rolling stock: 2
- Track gauge: 1,676 mm (5 ft 6 in)
- Operating speed: 44 km/h (27 mph), including halts

The Kolkata–Jaynagar Weekly Express is an Express train belonging to Eastern Railway zone that runs between Kolkata and Jaynagar in India. It is currently being operated with 13135/13136 train numbers on a weekly basis.

== Service ==
The 13135/Kolkata–Jaynagar Weekly Express has an average speed of 130 km/h and covers 619 km in 14h 5m. 13136/Jaynagar–Kolkata Weekly Express has an average speed of 134 km/h and covers 619 km in 15h 5m.

== Route and halts ==
The important halts of the train are:

- Kolkata
- Bandel Junction
- Barddhaman Junction
- Durgapur
- Asansol Junction
- Chittaranjan
- Madhupur Junction
- Jasidih Junction
- Jhajha
- Kiul Junction
- Barauni Junction
- Samastipur Junction
- Darbhanga Junction
- Sakri Junction
- Madhubani
- Jaynagar

== Coach composition ==
The train has standard LHB rakes with a max speed of 140 km/h. The train consists of 20 coaches:

- 2 AC II Tier
- 4 AC III Tier
- 9 Sleeper coaches
- 3 General
- 2 Head-on Generation

== Traction ==
Both trains are hauled by a Howrah Loco Shed-based WAP-7 or Asansol Loco Shed-based WAP-5 electric locomotive from Kolkata to till Jainagar and vice versa.

== Rake sharing ==
The trains shares its rake with 22323/22324 Shabd Bhedi Superfast Express

- 12319/12320 Kolkata–Agra Cantonment Superfast Express
- 12357/12358 Durgiana Express

== See also ==
- Kolkata railway station
- Jaynagar railway station
- Ganga Sagar Express
- Howrah–Jaynagar Passenger
