= Saryu Yamuna Express =

Train in India

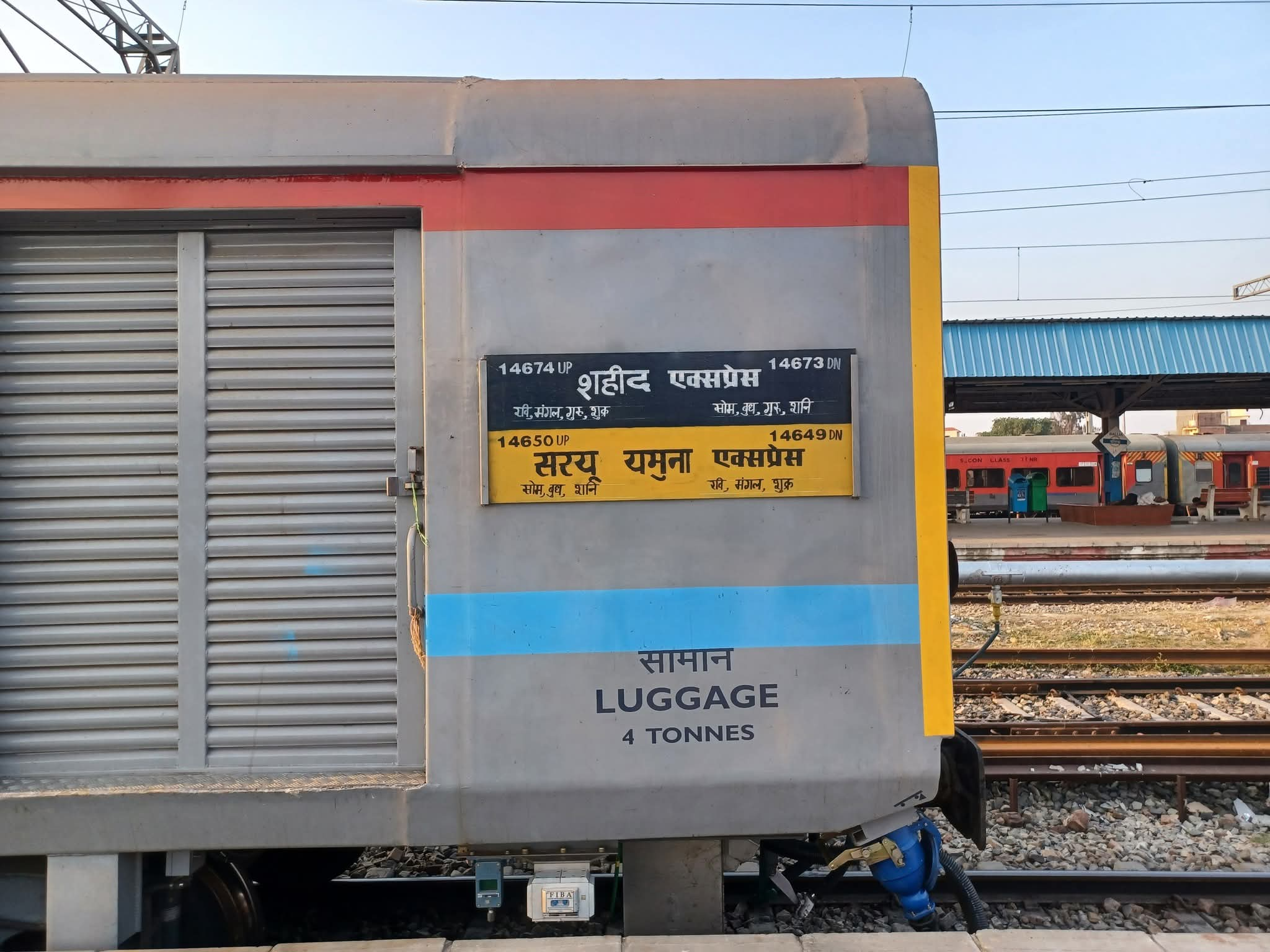
- Train Board of Saryu Yamuna Express

Overview
- Service type: Express
- First service: 1 October 1987; 39 years ago
- Current operator: Northern Railway

Route
- Termini: Jaynagar (JYG); Amritsar (ASR)
- Stops: 49
- Distance travelled: 1,586 km (985 mi)
- Average journey time: 33hrs 40mins
- Service frequency: Tri-weekly (Note: Runs three days in a week for every direction.)
- Train number: 14649 / 14650

On-board services
- Classes: AC 2 tier, AC 3 tier, Sleeper class, General Unreserved
- Seating arrangements: Yes
- Sleeping arrangements: Yes
- Catering facilities: E-catering only
- Observation facilities: Large windows
- Baggage facilities: Available
- Other facilities: Below the seats

Technical
- Rolling stock: LHB coach
- Track gauge: 1,676 mm (5 ft 6 in)
- Operating speed: 47 km/h (29 mph) average including halts.

The 14649 / 14650 Saryu Yamuna Express is an Express train belonging to Northern Railway zone that runs between Jaynagar and Amritsar Junction in India. It is currently being operated with 14649/14650 train numbers on tri-weekly basis.

== Service ==
The 14649/Saryu Yamuna Express has an average speed of 41 km/h and covers 1671 km in 40h 40m. The 14650/Saryu Yamuna Express has an average speed of 45 km/h and covers 1671 km in 37h 20m.

== Route & halts ==
The important halts of the train are:

- Jaynagar
- Madhubani
- Sakri Junction
- Darbhanga Junction
- Laheriasarai
- Samastipur Junction
- Muzaffarpur Junction
- Hajipur Junction
- Sonpur Junction
- Chhapra Junction
- Ballia
- Mau Junction
- Azamgarh
- Shahganj Junction
- Ayodhya Junction
- Faizabad Junction
- Lucknow Charbagh
- Shahjahanpur
- Bareilly Junction
- Rampur Junction
- Moradabad Junction
- Najibabad Junction
- Laksar Junction
- Saharanpur Junction
- Ambala Cantonment Junction
- Ambala City
- Ludhiana Junction
- Jalandhar City Junction
- Beas Junction
- Amritsar

== Coach composition ==
The train has standard ICF rakes with max speed of 110 kmph. The train consists of 20 coaches:

- 1 AC II Tier
- 1 AC III Tier
- 7 Sleeper coaches
- 9 General
- 2 Seating cum Luggage Rake

== Schedule ==
Train number	Station code	Departure station	Departure time	Departure day	Arrival station	Arrival time	Arrival day
14649	JYG	Jaynagar	7:15 AM	SUN TUE FRI	Amritsar Junction	11:55 PM	MON WED SAT
14650	ASR	Amritsar Junction	11:55 AM	MON WED SAT	Jaynagar	1:00 AM (Night)	WED FRI MON

== Traction ==
Both trains are hauled by a Ghaziabad Loco Shed / Ludhiana Loco Shed-based WAP-7 electric locomotive from Jaynagar to Amritsar and vice versa.

== Rake sharing ==
The train sharing its rake with 14673/14674 Shaheed Express.

== Direction reversal ==
The train reverses its direction 3 times:

- Shahganj railway station
- Samastipur Junction

== See also ==
- Jaynagar railway station
- Amritsar Junction railway station
- Shaheed Express
- Chhapra–Amritsar Weekly Express
