= Jaynagar–Rourkela Express =

Jaynagar–Ranchi Express
Overview
- Service type: Express
- First service: 26 January 2011; 15 years ago
- Current operator: South Eastern Railway zone

Route
- Termini: Jaynagar (JYG); Ranchi Junction (RNC)
- Stops: 17
- Distance travelled: 640 km (398 mi)
- Average journey time: 17h 0m
- Service frequency: Triweekly
- Train number: 18605/18606

On-board services
- Classes: AC 2 Tier, AC 3Tier, Sleeper, General Unreserved
- Seating arrangements: Yes
- Sleeping arrangements: Yes
- Catering facilities: No
- Observation facilities: ICF coach with CBC Coupling
- Entertainment facilities: No
- Baggage facilities: No
- Other facilities: Below the seats

Technical
- Rolling stock: 1
- Track gauge: 1,676 mm (5 ft 6 in)
- Operating speed: 38 km/h (24 mph), including halts

The Jaynagar–Ranchi Express is an Express train belonging to South Eastern Railway zone that runs between Ranchi Junction and Jaynagar in India. It is currently being operated with 18605/18606 train numbers on triweekly basis

== Route and halts ==
The important halts of the train are:

- Jaynagar
- Madhubani
- Sakri Junction
- Darbhanga Junction
- Samastipur Junction
- Barauni Junction
- kiul Junction
- Jhajha
- Jasidih Junction
- Dhanbad Junction
- Chandrapura Junction
- Bokaro Steel City
- Muri Junction
- Ranchi Junction

== Coach composition ==
The train has standard ICF rakes (CBC coupling) with max speed of 110 km/h. The train consists of 16 coaches:

- 5 General Unreserved
- 6 Sleeper
- 1 AC 2Tier
- 2 AC 3Tier
- 2 Seating cum Luggage Rake

The train reverses its direction 1 times:

- Asansol Junction
