= Lokmanya Tilak Terminus–Darbhanga Pawan Express =

Train in India

Lokmanya Tilak Terminus Jaynagar Pawan Express
Overview
- Service type: Express
- First service: 1 October 2012
- Last service: 9 February 2017
- Current operator: Central Railways

Route
- Termini: Lokmanya Tilak Terminus; Jaynagar
- Stops: 38 as 11065 Lokmanya Tilak Terminus Jaynagar Pawan Express, 36 as 11066 Jaynagar Lokmanya Tilak Terminus Pawan Express.
- Distance travelled: 1,880 km (1,168 mi)
- Average journey time: 37 hours 05 mins as 11065 Lokmanya Tilak Terminus Jaynagar Pawan Express, 38 hours 30 mins as 11066 Jaynagar Lokmanya Tilak Terminus Pawan Express.
- Service frequency: 11065 Lokmanya Tilak Terminus Jaynagar Pawan Express – Tuesday, Thursday and Sunday. 11066 Jaynagar Lokmanya Tilak Terminus Pawan Express – Tuesday, Thursday and Saturday.
- Train number: 11065 / 66

On-board services
- Classes: AC 2 tier, AC 3 tier, Sleeper Class, General Unreserved
- Seating arrangements: Yes
- Sleeping arrangements: Yes
- Catering facilities: Yes

Technical
- Rolling stock: Standard Indian Railway coaches
- Track gauge: 1,676 mm (5 ft 6 in)
- Electrification: Partial
- Operating speed: 110 km/h (68 mph) maximum 49.75 km/h (31 mph) including halts.

The 11065 / 66 Lokmanya Tilak Terminus-Jaynagar Pawan Express was an Express train belonging to Indian Railways - Central Railway zone that ran between Lokmanya Tilak Terminus & Jaynagar in India.

It operated as train number 11065 from Lokmanya Tilak Terminus to Jaynagar and as train number 11066 in the reverse direction serving the states of Maharashtra, Madhya Pradesh, Uttar Pradesh and Bihar .

== Coaches ==
The 11065 / 66 Lokmanya Tilak Terminus Jaynagar Pawan Express has 1 AC 2 tier, 1 AC 3 tier, 12 Sleeper Class, 6 General Unreserved & 2 Sitting cum Luggage Rack Coaches. In addition, it carried a Pantry car coach.

== Service ==
The 11065 Lokmanya Tilak Terminus Jaynagar Pawan Express covered the distance of 1,880 km (1,168 mi) in 37 hours 05 mins (50.70 km/h) & in 38 hours 30 mins as 11066 Jaynagar Lokmanya Tilak Terminus Pawan Express (48.83 km/h).

As the average speed of the train is below 55 km/h (34 mph), as per Indian Railway rules, its fare does not include a Superfast surcharge.

== Routeing ==
The 11065 / 66 Lokmanya Tilak Terminus Jaynagar Pawan Express ran from Lokmanya Tilak Terminus via Kalyan Junction, Igatpuri, Manmad Junction, Bhusaval Junction, Itarsi Junction, Jabalpur Junction, Satna, Allahabad Junction, Varanasi Junction, Ghazipur City, Hajipur Junction, Muzaffarpur Junction, Samastipur Junction, Darbhanga Junction, Sakri Junction railway station, Madhubani, to Jainagar, Bihar.

It reversed direction of travel at Allahabad Junction and Samastipur Junction.

== Traction ==
As sections of the route were yet to be fully electrified, until January 2014 (Now fully electrified) a Kalyan based WCAM 3 hauled the train from Lokmanya Tilak Terminus until Igatpuri handing over to a Bhusaval based WAP 4 until Itarsi Junction after which a pair of Itarsi based WDM 3A locomotives would power the train for the remainder of its journey.

With Central Railways progressively moving towards a complete changeover from DC to AC traction, it was hauled by a Itarsi based WAP 4 from Lokmanya Tilak Terminus between Itarsi based WDM 3A locomotives power the train for the remainder of its journey .

== Rake Sharing ==
The 11065 / 66 Lokmanya Tilak Terminus Jaynagar Pawan Express shared its rake with the 11061 / 62 Lokmanya Tilak Terminus Jaynagar Pawan Express . Later got extended to Jaynagar railway station.

== Operation ==
11065 Lokmanya Tilak Terminus Jaynagar Pawan Express ran from Lokmanya Tilak Terminus every Tuesday, Thursday and Sunday reaching Jaynagar on the 3rd day.

11066 Jaynagar Lokmanya Tilak Terminus Pawan Express ran from Jaynagar every Tuesday, Thursday and Saturday reaching Lokmanya Tilak Terminus on the 3rd day.
