= Swatantra Senani Superfast Express =

Train in India

Swatantrata Senani Superfast Express
Overview
- Service type: Superfast Express
- Locale: Delhi, Uttar Pradesh & Bihar
- First service: 1 July 2000; 25 years ago
- Current operator: East Central Railways

Route
- Termini: Jaynagar (JYG); New Delhi (NDLS)
- Stops: 22
- Distance travelled: 1,235 km (767 mi)
- Average journey time: 22 hours 30 minutes as 12561, 22 hours 40 minutes as 12562
- Service frequency: Daily
- Train number: 12561 / 12562

On-board services
- Classes: AC 1st Class, AC 2 tier, AC 3 tier, Sleeper class, General Unreserved
- Seating arrangements: Yes
- Sleeping arrangements: Yes
- Catering facilities: Available
- Observation facilities: Large windows
- Other facilities: Below the seats

Technical
- Rolling stock: LHB coach
- Track gauge: 1,676 mm (5 ft 6 in)
- Operating speed: 130 km/h (81 mph) maximum, 55 km/h (34 mph) average including halts

The 12561/12562 Swatantrata Senani Superfast Express is a Superfast Express train of Indian Railways that runs between Jaynagar and New Delhi in India.

Earlier, the train used to operate between Muzaffarpur and New Delhi, but was later extended up to Jaynagar.

== Overview ==
The Swatantra Senani Superfast Express was initially introduced between New Delhi and Muzaffarpur on 18 August 1998. It was later extended up to Darbhanga, and in 2009, the service was further extended to Jaynagar.

== Schedule ==
12423 / 12424 Dibrugarh–New Delhi Rajdhani Express Schedule
Train Type	Rajdhani Express
Distance	2432 km
Average Speed	~83 km/h
Journey Time (DBRG → NDLS)	~37 hrs 40 min
Journey Time (NDLS → DBRG)	~37 hrs 45 min
Classes Available	1A, 2A, 3A
Operating Days	Daily
Operator	East Central Railway zone

== Route and halts ==
12561 Jaynagar–New Delhi Swatantrata S Express and 12562 New Delhi–Jaynagar Swatantrata S Express
12561 JYG → NDLS				12562 NDLS → JYG			
Station	Arr.	Dep.	Day	Station	Arr.	Dep.	Day
Jaynagar	—	17:20	1	New Delhi	—	21:15	1
Madhubani	17:44	17:46	1	Aligarh Junction	22:58	23:00	1
Sakri Junction	18:01	18:03	1	Kanpur Central	02:35	02:40	2
Darbhanga Junction	19:00	19:05	1	Prayagraj Junction	05:15	05:25	2
Laheria Sarai	19:13	19:15	1	Gyanpur Road	06:38	06:40	2
Samastipur Junction	20:15	20:40	1	Varanasi Junction	08:05	08:15	2
Muzaffarpur Junction	21:50	21:55	1	Aunrihar Junction	08:50	08:52	2
Hajipur Junction	22:50	22:55	1	Ghazipur City	09:30	09:35	2
Sonpur Junction	23:06	23:08	1	Ballia	10:45	10:50	2
Chhapra	00:35	00:45	2	Suraimanpur	11:28	11:30	2
Suraimanpur	01:16	01:18	2	Chhapra	12:45	12:55	2
Ballia	01:50	01:55	2	Sonpur Junction	13:48	13:50	2
Ghazipur City	02:50	02:55	2	Hajipur Junction	14:02	14:07	2
Aunrihar Junction	03:40	03:42	2	Muzaffarpur Junction	15:15	15:20	2
Varanasi Junction	04:39	04:49	2	Samastipur Junction	16:30	16:55	2
Gyanpur Road	05:43	05:45	2	Laheria Sarai	17:36	17:38	2
Prayagraj Junction	07:00	07:10	2	Darbhanga Junction	17:55	18:00	2
Kanpur Central	09:35	09:40	2	Sakri Junction	18:18	18:20	2
Aligarh Junction	13:08	13:10	2	Madhubani	18:33	18:35	2
New Delhi	15:45	—	2	Jaynagar	19:25	—	2

== Coach composition ==
Category	Coaches	Total
Sleeper cum Luggage Rake (SLRD) (Divyangjan)	SLRD	1
General Unreserved (GEN)	GEN1, GEN2, GEN3, GEN4	4
Sleeper Class (SL)	S1, S2, S3, S4, S5, S6	6
Pantry Car (PC)	PC	1
AC 3 Economy (3E)	M1	1
AC 3 Tier (3A)	B1, B2, B3, B4, B5	5
AC 2 Tier (2A)	A1, A2	2
AC First Class (1A)	H1	1
Luggage/Parcel Rake (LPR)	LPR	1
Total Coaches		22

- Primary Maintenance – Jaynagar CD

== See also ==
- Sapt Kranti Express
- Vaishali Express
- Jaynagar–Anand Vihar Garib Rath Express
- Bihar Sampark Kranti Express
- Champaran Humsafar Express
