= Janaki Intercity Express =

Overview
- Service type: Express
- First service: 22 June 2016; 9 years ago (extended to Katihar)
- Current operator: East Central Railway zone

Route
- Termini: Manihari; Jaynagar
- Stops: 15
- Distance travelled: 370 km (230 mi)
- Average journey time: 11 hours 55 mins
- Service frequency: Daily
- Train number: 15283 / 15284

On-board services
- Classes: Unreserved; Sleeper
- Seating arrangements: Yes
- Sleeping arrangements: Yes
- Catering facilities: No

Technical
- Rolling stock: Standard Indian Railways Coaches
- Track gauge: 1,676 mm (5 ft 6 in)
- Operating speed: 32.5 km/h (20 mph)

The 15283 / 84 Janaki Intercity Express is an Express train belonging to Indian Railways East Central Railway zone that runs between Manihari and Jaynagar in India.

It operates as train number 15283 from Manihari to Jaynagar and as train number 15284 in the reverse direction serving the states of Bihar.

== History ==
This train was run up to Saharsa Junction. Later w.e.f. 22 June 2016 it was extended up to Katihar Junction.

== Coaches ==
The 15283 / 84 Janaki Intercity Express has 13 general unreserved, 1 Sleeper class & two SLR (seating with luggage rake) coaches . It does not carry a pantry car coach.

As is customary with most train services in India, coach composition may be amended at the discretion of Indian Railways depending on demand.

== Service ==
The 15283 Manihari - Jaynagar Janaki Intercity Express covers the distance of 370 km (230 mi) in 13 hours 05 mins (28 km/h) and in 10 hours 05 mins as the 15284 Jaynagar - Katihar Junction Intercity Express (37 km/h).

As the average speed of the train is lower than 55 km/h (34 mph), as per railway rules, its fare doesn't includes a Superfast surcharge.

== Stations ==
Station Code	Station Name	Distance (km)
MHI	Manihari	0
KIR	Katihar	24
PRNA	Purnia	52
PRNC	Purnia Court	57
BNKI	Banmankhi	88
MRIJ	Murliganj	107
DMH	Dauram Madhepura	130
SHC	Saharsa	151
SBV	Simri Bakhtiyarpur	168
MNE	Mansi	193
KGG	Khagaria	202
HPO	Hasanpur Road	242
SPJ	Samastipur	288
LSI	Laheriasarai	320
DBG	Darbhanga	325
SKI	Sakri	344
MBI	Madhubani	361
JYG	Jaynagar	392

== Traction ==
As route is whole electrified, electric loco used in the entire journey
