= Samastipur–Khagaria Loop Line =

Railway line in India

Overview
- Status: Operational
- Owner: Indian Railways
- Locale: Bihar, India
- Termini: Samastipur Junction; Khagaria Junction
- Stations: 17

Service
- Type: Single electric line
- Operator(s): East Central Railway zone

History
- Opened: 1912; 114 years ago

Technical
- Line length: 85 km (53 mi)
- Number of tracks: 1
- Track gauge: 1,676 mm (5 ft 6 in)
- Electrification: Yes
- Operating speed: 110 km/h (68 mph)

Samastipur–Khagaria Loop Line is a single 5 ft 6 in (1,676 mm) broad-gauge track from Samastipur Junction to Khagaria Junction of Bihar state. The line connects Samastipur Junction of Barauni–Gorakhpur line to Khagaria Junction railway station that provides access to Barauni–Guwahati line. The whole line falls under Samastipur Division of East Central Railway.

== History ==
The Samastipur–Khagaria metre-gauge line was constructed in two phases by Tirhut Railway. The first phase, from Samastipur to Rusera Ghat, was completed in 1912, while the second phase extended from Rusera Ghat to Khagaria. The line was later converted to broad gauge, with the gauge conversion work completed in 2006.

== Trains ==
- Dibrugarh Rajdhani Express
- New Jalpaiguri–New Delhi Superfast Express
- Saharsa–Amritsar Jan Sadharan Express (via Sirhind)
- Saharsa–Amritsar Jan Sadharan Express (via Chandigarh)
- Janaki Intercity Express
- Champaran Humsafar Express
- Udaipur City–New Jalpaiguri Weekly Express
- New Jalpaiguri–Amritsar Karmabhoomi Express
- Saharsa Samastipur MEMU

== See also ==
- Indian Railways
- Samastipur Junction
- Khagaria Junction
- Samastipur railway division
- Munger Division
- East Central Railway zone
