= Madhubani railway station =

Railway station in Madhubani, Bihar, India

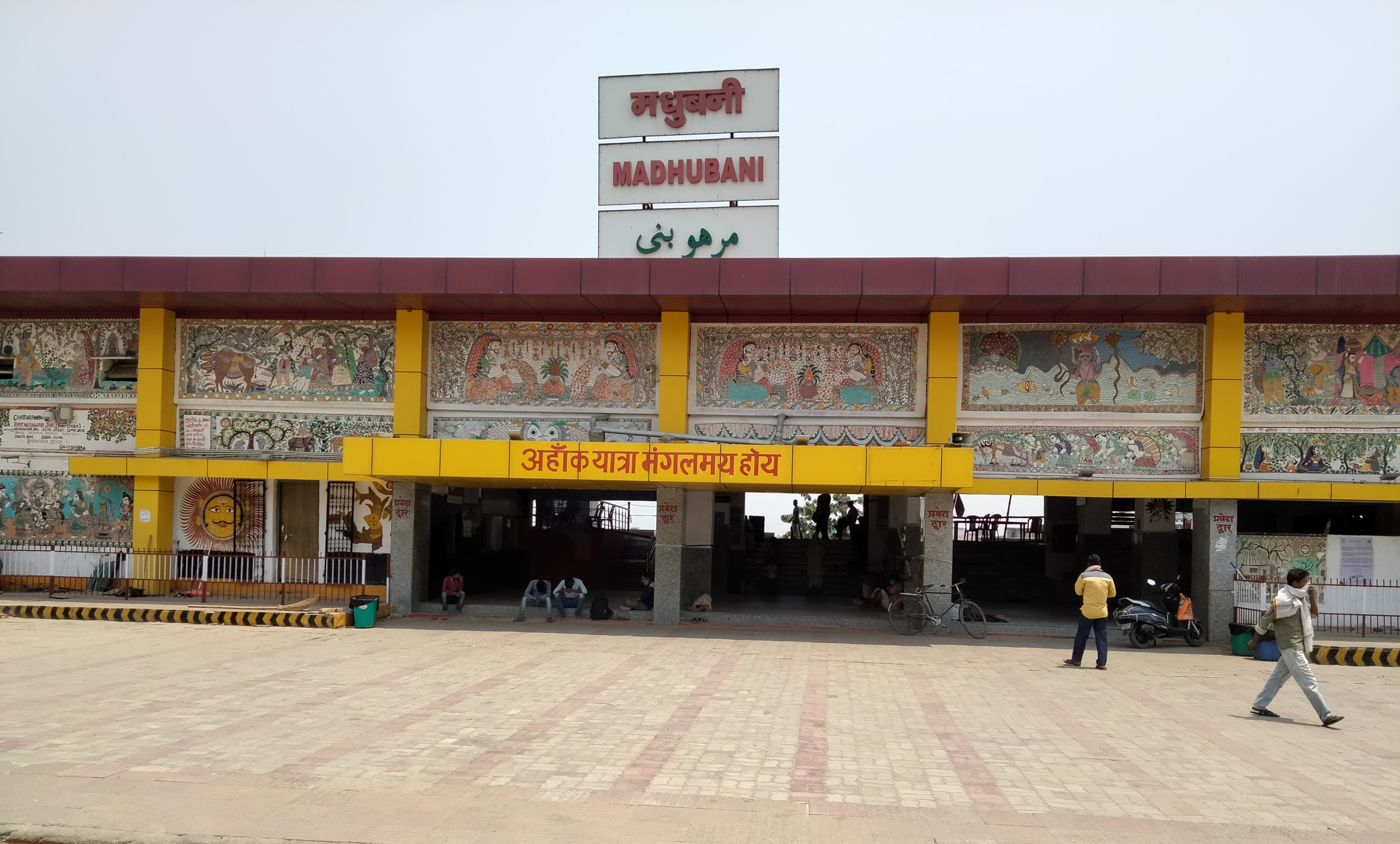
- Madhubani railway station building

General information
- Location: SH 52, station chowk, Madhubani, Bihar; India
- Coordinates: 26.3487°N 86.0773°E
- Elevation: 108 metres (354 ft)
- System: Indian Railways station
- Owner: Indian Railways
- Operator: East Central Railway
- Platforms: 3
- Tracks: 3 (single diesel BG)
- Connections: Auto stand

Construction
- Structure type: Standard (on-ground station)
- Parking: Available
- Cycle facilities: yes

Other information
- Status: Functioning
- Station code: MBI
- Zone(s): East Central Railway
- Division(s): Samastipur

History
- Opened: 1902
- Rebuilt: 2007

Passengers
- 5lakh/perday
Location

Madhubani railway station (station code: MBI), is a Amrit Bharat railway station in Madhubani district, Bihar. It serves Madhubani city. The station consists of 3 platforms.

View of the Platform Number 1 at the Madhubani Railway Station.

== Major trains ==
- Jaynagar–Anand Vihar Garib Rath Express
- Darbhanga–Jaynagar Passenger
- Ganga Sagar Express
- Lokmanya Tilak Terminus–Darbhanga Pawan Express
- Janaki Intercity Express
- Puri–Jaynagar Express
- Jaynagar– DANAPUR Intercity Express
- Jaynagar– Raurkela Express
- Samastipur–Jaynagar DEMU
- Kolkata–Jaynagar Weekly Express
- Samastipur–Jaynagar Passenger
- Kamla Ganga Intercity Fast Passenger
- Saryu Yamuna Express
- Shaheed Express
- Swatantra Senani Superfast Express
- JAYNAGAR-BHAGALPUR EXPRESS
- JAYNAGAR-PATNA INTERCITY EXPRESS
- Samastipur–Jaynagar Passenger
- Jaynagar–Udhna Antyodaya Express
- Howrah–Jaynagar Passenger
- Namo Bharat Rapid Rail

== About the station ==
- It is awarded by the Indian Railways for the best railway station in India.

The whole station is decorated by Mithila paintings by regional painters.

View of the platforms of the Madhubani Railway Station.
