= Darbhanga–Jaynagar line =

Railway route in India

Darbhanga–Jaynagar section (Including Sakri–Saraigarh and Hasanpur Road)
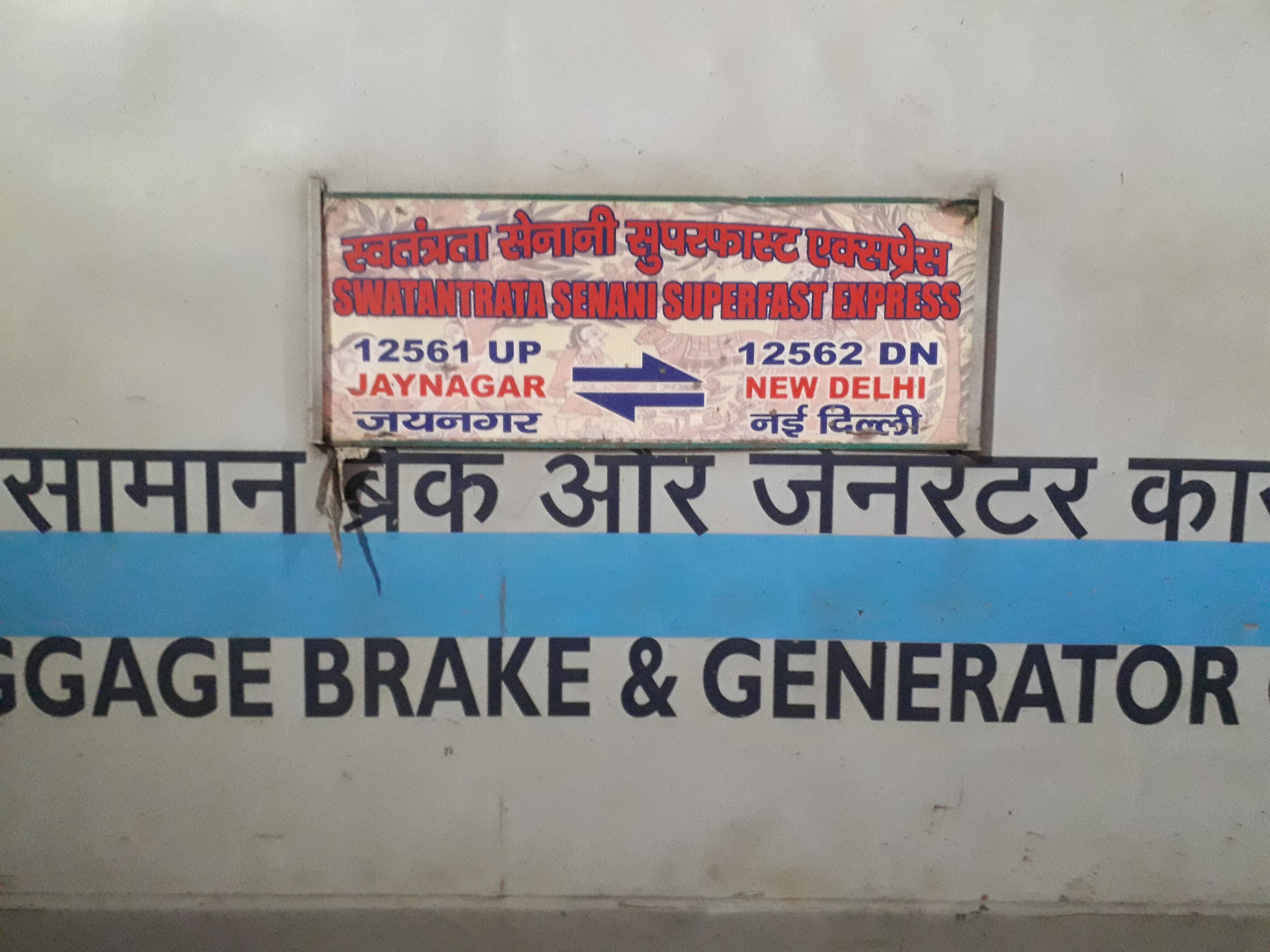
- Swatantra Senani Superfast Express is an important train on this route

Overview
- Status: Operational
- Owner: Indian Railways
- Locale: Bihar
- Termini: Darbhanga Junction; Jaynagar

Service
- Type: Passenger and freight train line
- Services: Darbhanga–Sitamarhi line; Barauni–Gorakhpur, Raxaul and Jainagar lines
- Operator(s): Indian Railways, East Central Railway
- Rolling stock: WDM-3A, WDS-5, WDP-4, WDG-4, WAG-7, WAG-9, WAG-9H, WAP-4 and WAP-7

Technical
- Number of tracks: 1 (electrified) (doubling is in progress)
- Track gauge: 5 ft 6 in (1,676 mm) broad gauge
- Electrification: 25 kV 50 Hz AC OHLE (between 2011- December 2014): (started from 24 December 2014)
- Operating speed: up to 130 km/h (81 mph)

The Darbhanga–Jaynagar line is a railway line connecting Darbhanga Junction to Jaynagar in the Indian state of Bihar. The line passes through the plains of North Bihar and the Gangetic Plain in Bihar.
