= Jaynagar–Anand Vihar Garib Rath Express =

Jaynagar - Anand Vihar Terminal Garib Rath Express
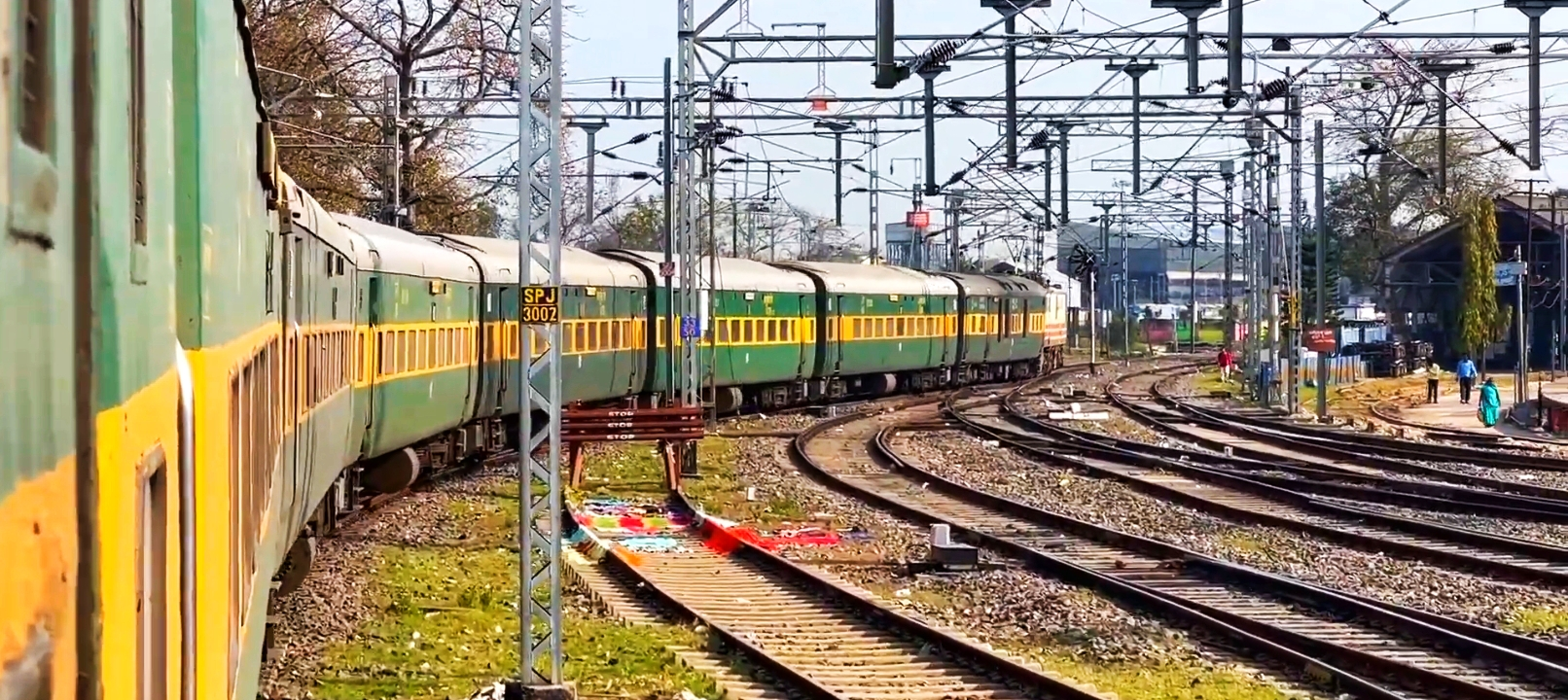
- Jaynagar - Anand Vihar Terminal Garib Rath Express At Samastipur Junction railway station

Overview
- Service type: Superfast Express, Garib Rath Express
- First service: 10 February 2011
- Current operator: East Central Railways

Route
- Termini: Jaynagar; Anand Vihar Terminal
- Stops: 19
- Distance travelled: 1,252 km (778 mi)
- Average journey time: 20 hours 25 minutes as 12435 Jaynagar Anand Vihar Garib Rath Express; 20 hours 30 minutes as 12436 Anand Vihar Jaynagar Garib Rath Express
- Service frequency: Bi-weekly
- Train number: 12435 / 12436

On-board services
- Class: AC 3 tier
- Seating arrangements: No
- Sleeping arrangements: Yes
- Auto-rack arrangements: No
- Catering facilities: No
- Observation facilities: Previously ran as 12435 / 36 Patna Hazrat Nizamuddin Garib Rath Express
- Baggage facilities: Storage space under berth

Technical
- Rolling stock: Standard Indian Railways Garib Rath Coaches
- Track gauge: 1,676 mm (5 ft 6 in)
- Electrification: Fully
- Operating speed: 130 km/h (81 mph) maximum,61.20 km/h (38 mph), including halts

The 12435/12436 Jaynagar–Anand Vihar Terminal Garib Rath Express is a Superfast Express train of the Garib Rath series operated by Indian Railways under the East Central Railway zone. It connects Jaynagar in Bihar with Anand Vihar Terminal in Delhi.

The train operates as 12435 from Jaynagar to Anand Vihar Terminal and as 12436 in the reverse direction, serving the states of Bihar and Uttar Pradesh, along with the National Capital Territory of Delhi.

== History ==
The proposal for a Garib Rath service connecting Jaynagar with Delhi was announced by Railway Minister Lalu Prasad Yadav in September 2007. The service was subsequently included in the 2008–09 Railway Budget as a bi-weekly train between Delhi and Jaynagar via Patna. By October 2008, the Jaynagar–Delhi Garib Rath was among the Garib Rath services operating under East Central Railway.

In February 2011, the train's Delhi terminus was shifted from Hazrat Nizamuddin to Anand Vihar Terminal. The change took effect from 9 February 2011, as part of the relocation of several trains to the newly developed terminal. The service has since operated as the Jaynagar–Anand Vihar Terminal Garib Rath Express.

== Coaches ==
The 12435/12436 Jaynagar–Anand Vihar Terminal Garib Rath Express operates with an LHB rake comprising 20 AC 3-tier coaches and two End-on-Generation (EOG) coaches. It does not have a dedicated pantry car.

== Service ==
The 12435 Jaynagar–Anand Vihar Terminal Garib Rath Express covers a distance of 1,252 km (778 mi) in approximately 20 hours 50 minutes, at an average speed of 60.1 km/h (37.3 mph). In the reverse direction, train 12436 covers the same distance in approximately 20 hours 30 minutes, at an average speed of 61.07 km/h (37.95 mph).

Under Indian Railways' superfast surcharge rules, a broad-gauge train must have an average speed of at least 55 km/h (34 mph)in both directions to qualify for the surcharge.

== Route ==
The 12435/12436 Jaynagar–Anand Vihar Terminal Garib Rath Express runs from Jaynagar through Madhubani, Sakri, Darbhanga, Laheria Sarai, Haiaghat, Samastipur, Barauni, Mokama, Bakhtiyarpur, Patna, Danapur, Ara, Bihiya, Dumraon, Buxar, Gahmar, Pt. Deen Dayal Upadhyaya Junction, Prayagraj, Kanpur Central and Aligarh before reaching Anand Vihar Terminal.

== Operation ==
Train 12435 Jaynagar–Anand Vihar Terminal Garib Rath Express departs from Jaynagar every Monday and Friday, reaching Anand Vihar Terminal the following day.

Train 12436 Anand Vihar Terminal–Jaynagar Garib Rath Express departs from Anand Vihar Terminal every Tuesday and Saturday, reaching Jaynagar the following day.
