= Howrah–Jaynagar Express =

Passenger train in India

Overview
- Service type: Express
- Current operator: Eastern Railway

Route
- Termini: Howrah Junction (HWH); Jaynagar (JYG)
- Stops: 117
- Distance travelled: 718 km (446 mi)
- Average journey time: 25h
- Service frequency: Daily (Note: Runs seven days in a week for every direction.)
- Train number: 13031/13032

On-board services
- Class: Unreserved
- Seating arrangements: Yes
- Sleeping arrangements: No
- Catering facilities: No
- Observation facilities: ICF coach
- Entertainment facilities: No
- Baggage facilities: Below the seats

Technical
- Rolling stock: 4
- Track gauge: 5 ft 6 in (1,676 mm)
- Electrification: No
- Operating speed: 29 km/h (18 mph) average with halts

Howrah–Jaynagar Express is an express train belonging to the Eastern Railway zone that runs between Howrah Junction and Jaynagar via Bandel, Bardhaman, Rampurhat, Bhagalpur. It is used to operate with 53041/53042 train numbers as a passenger train on a daily basis. But after corona pandemic, It is promoted to an express train with train number 13031/13032 keeping same halts. The train is also known as Dhuliyan Passenger.

== Average speed and frequency ==
The 13031/Howrah–Jaynagar Express runs with an average speed of 29 km/h and completes 718 km in 25h. The 13032/Jaynagar–Howrah Express runs with an average speed of 27 km/h and completes 718 km in 26h 40m

== Route and halts ==
The important halts of the train are:

- Howrah Junction
- Seoraphuli Junction
- Bandel Junction
- Barddhaman Junction
- Guskara
- Rampurhat Junction
- Murarai
- Pakur
- Barharwa Junction
- Tinpahar Junction
- Sahibganj Junction
- Shivanarayanpur
- Kahalgaon
- Bhagalpur Junction
- Bariarpur
- Jamalpur Junction
- Dharara
- Kiul Junction
- Barauni Junction
- Samastipur Junction
- Laheriasarai
- Darbhanga Junction
- Sakri Junction
- Madhubani
- Jaynagar

The other halts are including Serampore, Chandannagar, Chuchura, Pundooah, Memari.

== Coach composite ==
The train has standard ICF rakes with max speed of 110 kmph. The train consists of 11 coaches:

- 9 General Unreserved
- 2 Seating cum Luggage Rake

== Traction ==
Both trains are hauled by an Asansol Loco Shed-based WAG-5 or Santragachhi-based WAP-4 electric locomotive from Howrah to Jaynagar and vice versa.

== Rake sharing ==
The train shares its rake with 13045/13046 Howrah–Deoghar Mayurakshi Express.

== See also ==
- Jaynagar railway station
- Howrah Junction railway station
- Howrah–Rajgir Fast Passenger
