= Hayaghat railway station =

Railway station in Bihar, India

Hayaghat Railway Station
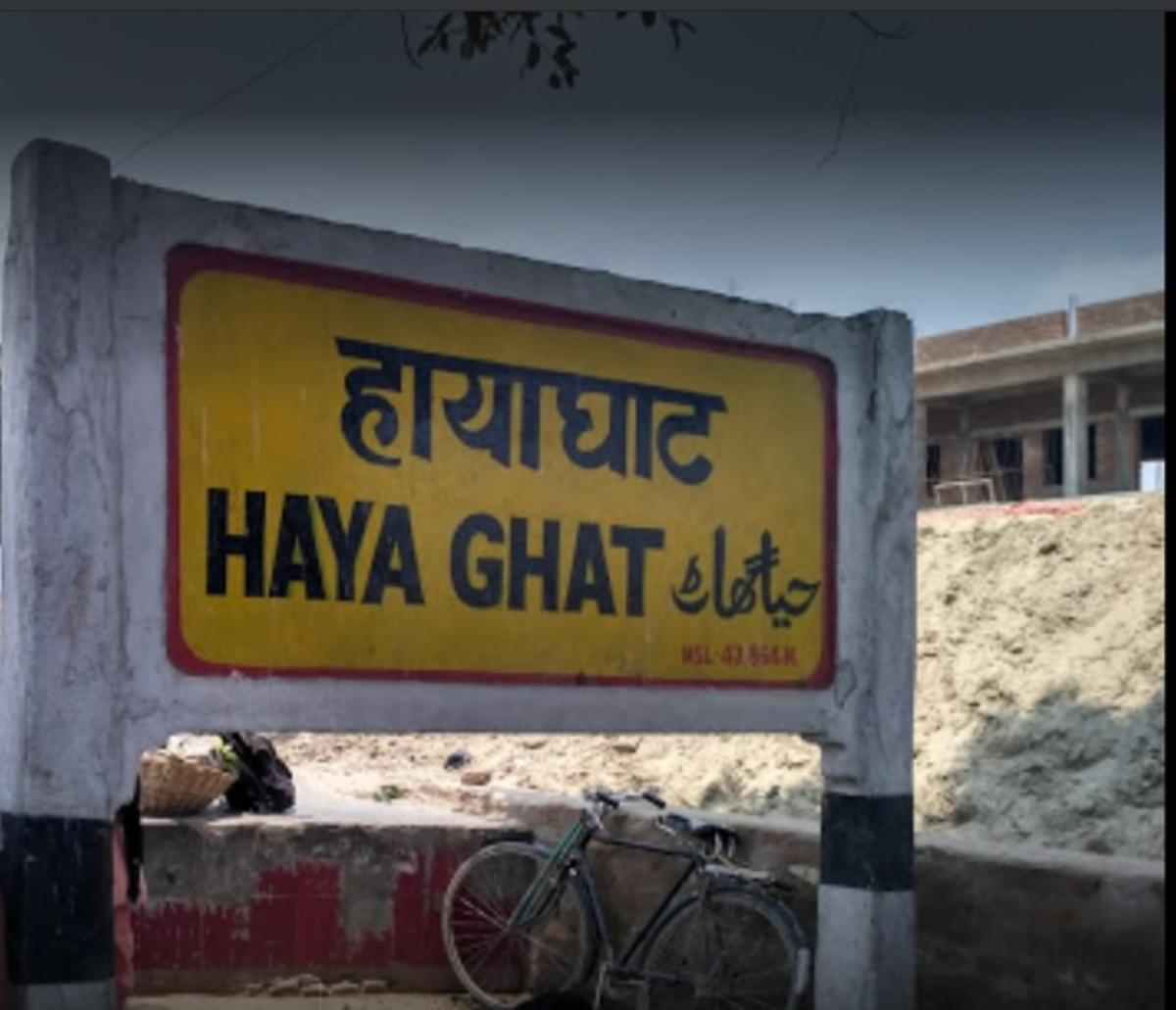
- Hayaghat Railway Station, Darbhanga district

General information
- Location: Sirnia, Darbhanga, Bihar; India
- Coordinates: E26°01′13″N 85°52′42″E
- Elevation: 54 metres (177 ft)
- System: Indian Railways Station
- Owner: Indian Railways
- Operator: East Central Railways
- Platforms: 1
- Tracks: 2

Construction
- Structure type: Standard on ground

Other information
- Status: Functional
- Station code: HYT
- Zone(s): East Central Railway zone
- Division(s): Samastipur
Location
- Location within Bihar Location within India

Hayaghat Railway station (station code: HYT), is situated in Sirnia, Darbhanga district, in the Indian state of Bihar.. Hayaghat is not a major railway station, only a few long-distance trains stop here. 14 Express Trains and 10 Passenger Trains stop at Hayaghat station. The nearest main railway station to Hayaghat is Laheriasarai railway station (LSI) which is about 11 km away.

== Platforms ==
There is only one platform at Hayaghat railway station.

== Trains ==
Hayaghat railway station is a station of the East Central Railways. It is located on the Samastipur and Madhubani rail routes. Here are some trains that are passing through Hayaghat railway station:

- Jaynagar–Anand Vihar Garib Rath Express
- Gangasagar Express
- Intercity-Express
- Saryu Yamuna Express,

and many more.

== Nearest airports ==
The nearest airports to Patna Junction are:

- Darbhanga Airport
- Lok Nayak Jayaprakash Airport, Patna
- Gaya Airport, Gaya

== See also ==
- Darbhanga
- Laheriasarai
