= Ganga Sagar Express =

Train in India

Overview
- Service type: Express
- First service: 1 May 1989; 37 years ago
- Current operator: Eastern Railway

Route
- Termini: Sealdah (SDAH); Jaynagar (JYG)
- Stops: 21
- Distance travelled: 623 km (387 mi)
- Average journey time: 15 hours
- Service frequency: Daily
- Train number: 13185 / 13186

On-board services
- Classes: AC 2 Tier, AC 3 Tier, Sleeper Class, General Unreserved
- Seating arrangements: Yes
- Sleeping arrangements: Yes
- Catering facilities: E-catering
- Observation facilities: Large windows
- Baggage facilities: Available
- Other facilities: Below the seats

Technical
- Rolling stock: LHB coach
- Track gauge: 1,676 mm (5 ft 6 in)
- Operating speed: 42 km/h (26 mph) average including halts.

The 13185 / 13186 Ganga Sagar Express is an express train belonging to Eastern Railway zone that runs between Sealdah and Jaynagar in India. It is currently being operated with 13185/13186 train numbers on Daily basis. It includes coaches of First AC, AC two tier, AC three tier, and sleeper class,& General Coaches but does not include a pantry car. The Tatkal scheme is available.

== Time table ==
Station code	Halts	Arrival	Departure
SDAH	Sealdah		17:45
NH	Naihati Junction	18:28	18:33
BDC	Bandel Junction	19:01	19:05
BWN	Barddhaman Junction	20:19	20:23
DGR	Durgapur	21:17	21:22
RNG	RaniGanj	21:41	21:43
ASN	Asansol Junction	21:59	22:04
CRJ	Chittaranjan	22:27	22:29
JMT	Jamtara	22:43	22:45
MDP	Madhupur Junction	23:15	23:18
JSME	Jasidih Junction	23:45	23:50
JAJ	Jhajha	01:00	01:05
BJU	Barauni Junction	03:40	03:50
DSS	Dalsingh Sarai	04:17	04:19
SPJ	Samastipur Junction	05:05	05:10
HYT	Haiaghat	05:31	05:33
LSI	Laheria Sarai	05:56	05:58
DBG	Darbhanga Junction	06:15	06:20
SKI	Sakri Junction	06:52	05:54
MBI	Madhubani	07:09	07:12
RJA	Rajnagar	07:24	07:26
JYG	Jaynagar	08:45	

== Traction ==
Since the route is now fully electrified, it is hauled by a Sealdah Loco Shed-based WAP-7 or Howrah Loco Shed-based WAP-4 electric locomotive throughout the journey.

== See also ==
- Kolkata railway station
- Jaynagar railway station
- Kolkata - Jaynagar Weekly Express
- Howrah - Jaynagar Passenger
