= Nirmali railway station =

Railway station in Supaul, India

General information
- Location: Supaul, Bihar; India
- Coordinates: 26.3058°N 86.5753°E
- Elevation: 59 metres (194 ft)
- System: Indian Railways station
- Owner: Indian Railways
- Operator: East Central Railway
- Line: Darbhanga–Nirmali- Saraygarh broad metre-gauge line
- Platforms: 3
- Tracks: 4
- Connections: Auto stand

Construction
- Structure type: Standard (on-ground station)
- Parking: Yes
- Cycle facilities: No

Other information
- Status: Active
- Station code: NMA
- Zone(s): East Central Railway
- Division(s): Samastipur

History
- Opened: Yes
- Closed: No
- Rebuilt: Yes

Passengers
- 1400
Location

Nirmali railway station (station code: NMA), is a broad metre gauge railway station in Supaul District, of the Indian state of Bihar. The station consists of three platforms and serves Nirmali city. The station lies on Saraygarh-Darbhanga broad gauge line.

== Major train servies ==
1. (05548) Saharsha - Laheriyasarai MEMU
2. (05547) Laheriyasarai - Saharsha MEMU
3. (05544) Saharsha - Laheriyasarai MEMU
4. (05543) Laheriyasarai - Saharsha MEMU
5. (05546) Saharsha - Laheriyasarai MEMU
6. (05547) Laheriyasarai - Saharsha MEMU
7. (75218) Forbesganj - Darbhanga DEMU
8. (75217) Darbhanga - Forbesganj DEMU
9. (13211) Danapur Intercity Express
10. (13212) Jogbani Intercity Express
