= Jaynagar–Ara Intercity Express =

Express train belonging to Indian Railways East Central Railway zone

Overview
- Service type: Express
- Current operator: East Central Railway zone

Route
- Termini: Jaynagar; Ara
- Stops: 18
- Distance travelled: 276 km (171 mi)
- Average journey time: 9 hours 30 mins
- Service frequency: Daily
- Train number: 13225 / 13226

On-board services
- Classes: AC Chair car, general unreserved
- Seating arrangements: Yes
- Sleeping arrangements: Yes
- Catering facilities: No

Technical
- Rolling stock: Standard Indian Railways Coaches
- Track gauge: 1,676 mm (5 ft 6 in)
- Operating speed: 43 km/h (27 mph)

The 13225 / 26 Jaynagar–Ara Intercity Express is an Express train belonging to Indian Railways East Central Railway Zone that runs between Jaynagar and Ara in India.

It operates as train number 13225 from Jaynagar to Ara and as train number 13226 in the reverse direction serving the states of Bihar.

== Coaches ==
The 13225 / 26 Jaynagar - Rajendra Nagar Terminal Intercity Express has one AC Chair Car, five general unreserved & two SLR (seating with luggage rake) coaches . It does not carry a pantry car coach.

As is customary with most train services in India, coach composition may be amended at the discretion of Indian Railways depending on demand.

== Service ==
The 13225 Jaynagar - Rajendra Nagar Terminal Intercity Express covers the distance of 290 km (180 mi) in 8 hours 20 mins (32 km/h) and in 7 hours 45 mins as the 13226 Rajendra Nagar Terminal - Jaynagar Intercity Express (34 km/h).

As the average speed of the train is lower than 55 km/h (34 mph), as per railway rules, its fare doesn't includes a Superfast surcharge.

== Routing ==
The 13225 / 26 Jaynagar - Rajendra Nagar Terminal Intercity Express runs from Jaynagar via Darbhanga Junction, Barauni Junction, Bakhtiyarpur Junction to Rajendra Nagar Terminal.

== Traction ==
As the route is going to electrification, a Mughalsarai Junction based WDM-3A diesel locomotive pulls the train to its destination.
