= Shaheed Express =

Train in India

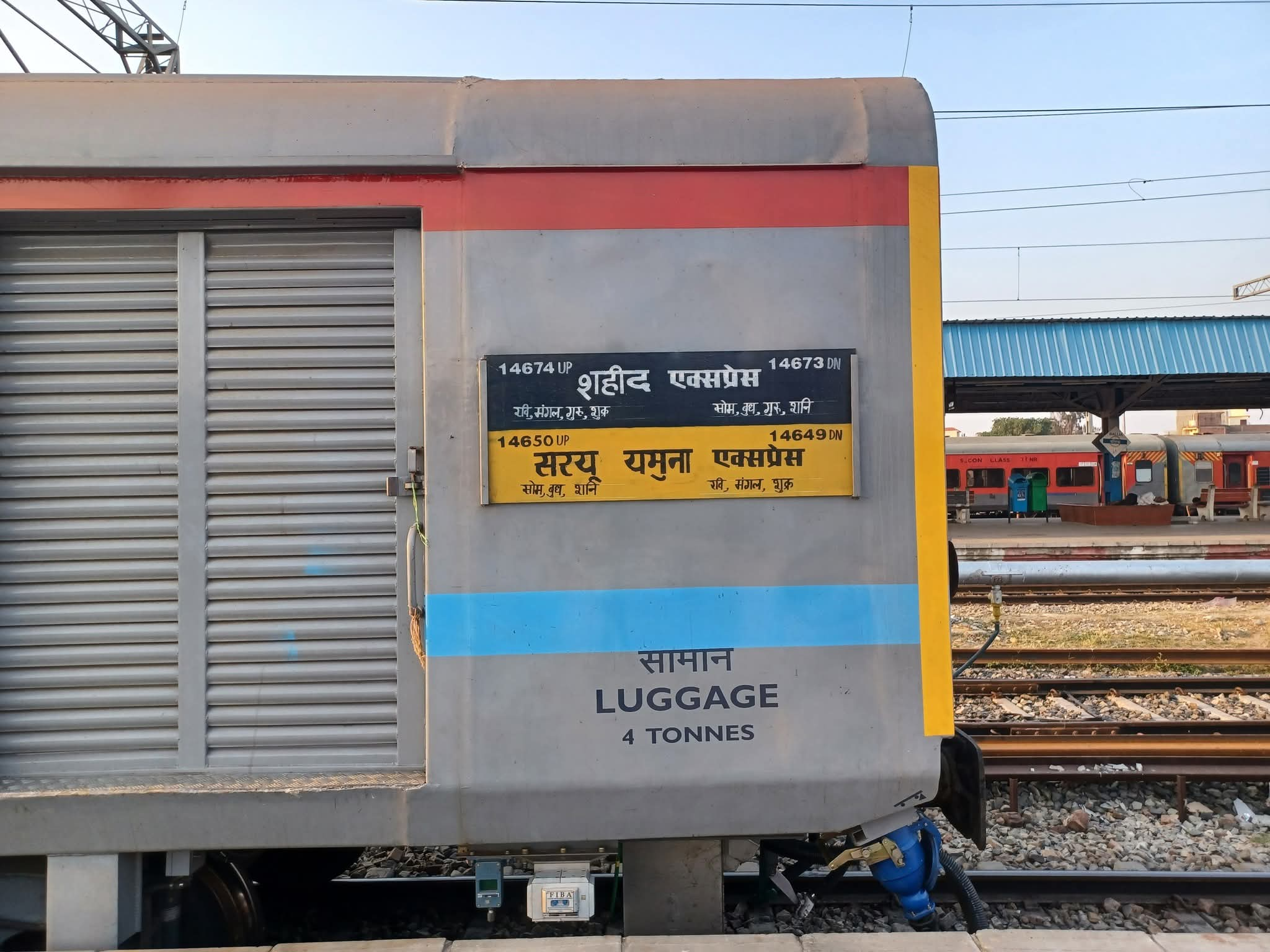
- Train Board of Saheed Express

Overview
- Service type: Express
- First service: 1 October 1988; 37 years ago
- Current operator: Northern Railway

Route
- Termini: Amritsar (ASR); Jaynagar (JYG)
- Stops: 47
- Distance travelled: 1,568 km (974 mi)
- Average journey time: 33 hours 40 mins
- Service frequency: 4 days a week
- Train number: 14673 / 14674

On-board services
- Classes: AC 2 tier, AC 3 tier, Sleeper class, General Unreserved
- Seating arrangements: Yes
- Sleeping arrangements: Yes
- Catering facilities: On-board catering, E-catering
- Observation facilities: Large windows
- Baggage facilities: Available
- Other facilities: Below the seats

Technical
- Rolling stock: LHB coach
- Track gauge: 1,676 mm (5 ft 6 in)
- Operating speed: 47 km/h (29 mph) average including halts.

The 14673 / 14674 Shaheed Express is an Express train belonging to Indian Railways – Northern Railway zone that runs between Amritsar Junction and Jaynagar in India.

It operates as train number 14674 from Amritsar Junction to Jaynagar and as train number 14673 in the reverse direction, serving the states of Punjab, Haryana, Delhi, Uttar Pradesh and Bihar.

== Coaches ==
Coach composition of 14673/14674 Shaheed Express
Class	Number of coaches
Sleeper class (SL)	6
AC 3 tier (3A)	4
AC 3 tier Economy (3E)	2
AC 2 tier (2A)	2
AC First Class (1A)	1
General Unreserved (UR/GEN)	5
End-on Generator (EOG)	2
Total	22

== Service ==
The 14674 / 73 Amritsar–Jaynagar Shaheed Express covers the distance of 1,654 km (1,028 mi) in 37 hours 35 minutes (44.01 km/h) and in 41 hours 00 minutes as 14673 Jaynagar–Amritsar Shaheed Express (40.34 km/h).

As the average speed of the train is below 55 km/h (34 mph), as per Indian Railway rules, its fare does not include a Superfast surcharge.

== Route and halts ==
14673 / 14674 Shaheed Express Route and Timetable
#	Station (Up: Jaynagar → Amritsar)	Arr (14673)	Dep (14673)	Day	Station (Down: Amritsar → Jaynagar)	Arr (14674)	Dep (14674)	Day
1	Jaynagar (JYG)	—	07:20	1	Amritsar Jn (ASR)	—	13:05	1
2	Khajauli (KJI)	07:32	07:34	1	Beas (BEAS)	13:33	13:35	1
3	Rajanagar (RJA)	07:44	07:46	1	Jalandhar City (JUC)	14:15	14:20	1
4	Madhubani (MBI)	07:56	07:58	1	Jalandhar Cantt (JRC)	14:29	14:31	1
5	Pandaul (PDW)	08:06	08:08	1	Phagwara Jn (PGW)	14:43	14:45	1
6	Sakri Jn (SKI)	08:15	08:17	1	Phillaur Jn (PHR)	15:23	15:25	1
7	Darbhanga Jn (DBG)	08:50	08:55	1	Dhandari Kalan (DDL)	15:56	16:06	1
8	Laheria Sarai (LSI)	09:03	09:05	1	Khanna (KNN)	16:39	16:41	1
9	Haiaghat (HYT)	09:18	09:20	1	Mandigovindgarh (GVG)	16:48	16:50	1
10	Samastipur Jn (SPJ)	10:20	10:45	1	Sirhind Jn (SIR)	17:00	17:02	1
11	Dholi (DOL)	11:11	11:13	1	Rajpura Jn (RPJ)	17:18	17:20	1
12	Muzaffarpur Jn (MFP)	11:45	11:50	1	Ambala City (UBC)	17:41	17:43	1
13	Hajipur Jn (HJP)	12:40	12:45	1	Ambala Cantt (UMB)	18:05	18:18	1
14	Sonpur Jn (SEE)	12:55	12:57	1	Yamunanagar JUD (YJUD)	19:00	19:05	1
15	Chhapra (CPR)	14:30	14:40	1	Saharanpur (SRE)	19:45	20:10	1
16	Siwan Jn (SV)	15:30	15:35	1	Roorkee (RK)	21:00	21:05	1
17	Mairwa (MW)	15:52	15:54	1	Laksar Jn (LRJ)	21:33	21:38	1
18	Bhatpar Rani (BHTR)	16:08	16:10	1	Najibabad Jn (NBD)	22:23	22:28	1
19	Bhatni Jn (BTT)	16:30	16:35	1	Dhampur (DPR)	23:10	23:12	1
20	Deoria Sadar (DEOS)	16:58	17:00	1	Kanth (KNT)	23:40	23:42	1
21	Gorakhpur Jn (GKP)	19:05	19:15	1	Moradabad (MB)	00:25	00:35	2
22	Khalilabad (KLD)	19:53	19:55	1	Rampur (RMU)	01:25	01:27	2
23	Basti (BST)	20:23	20:26	1	Bareilly (BE)	02:10	02:12	2
24	Babhnan (BV)	20:49	20:51	1	Shahjehanpur (SPN)	03:30	03:32	2
25	Mankapur Jn (MUR)	21:20	21:22	1	Lucknow NR (LKO)	06:05	06:15	2
26	Gonda Jn (GD)	22:00	22:05	1	Barabanki Jn (BBK)	06:55	06:57	2
27	Barabanki Jn (BBK)	23:53	23:55	1	Gonda Jn (GD)	08:35	08:40	2
28	Lucknow NR (LKO)	00:40	00:50	2	Mankapur Jn (MUR)	09:25	09:27	2
29	Shahjehanpur (SPN)	03:19	03:21	2	Babhnan (BV)	09:55	09:57	2
30	Bareilly (BE)	04:20	04:22	2	Basti (BST)	10:25	10:28	2
31	Rampur (RMU)	05:14	05:16	2	Khalilabad (KLD)	11:00	11:02	2
32	Moradabad (MB)	06:03	06:13	2	Gorakhpur Jn (GKP)	11:40	11:50	2
33	Kanth (KNT)	06:41	06:43	2	Deoria Sadar (DEOS)	13:25	13:27	2
34	Dhampur (DPR)	07:06	07:08	2	Bhatni Jn (BTT)	13:50	13:55	2
35	Najibabad Jn (NBD)	07:44	07:49	2	Bhatpar Rani (BHTR)	14:12	14:14	2
36	Laksar Jn (LRJ)	08:33	08:38	2	Mairwa (MW)	14:28	14:30	2
37	Roorkee (RK)	09:00	09:05	2	Siwan Jn (SV)	14:54	14:59	2
38	Saharanpur (SRE)	10:10	10:20	2	Chhapra (CPR)	15:50	16:00	2
39	Yamunanagar JUD (YJUD)	10:46	10:48	2	Sonpur Jn (SEE)	17:30	17:32	2
40	Ambala Cantt (UMB)	11:40	11:45	2	Hajipur Jn (HJP)	17:50	17:55	2
41	Ambala City (UBC)	11:56	11:58	2	Muzaffarpur Jn (MFP)	18:40	18:45	2
42	Rajpura Jn (RPJ)	12:33	12:35	2	Dholi (DOL)	19:20	19:22	2
43	Sirhind Jn (SIR)	12:55	12:57	2	Samastipur Jn (SPJ)	20:55	21:20	2
44	Mandigovindgarh (GVG)	13:04	13:06	2	Haiaghat (HYT)	22:00	22:02	2
45	Khanna (KNN)	13:13	13:15	2	Laheria Sarai (LSI)	22:15	22:17	2
46	Ludhiana Jn (LDH)	14:06	14:16	2	Darbhanga Jn (DBG)	22:30	22:35	2
47	Phillaur Jn (PHR)	14:30	14:32	2	Sakri Jn (SKI)	23:10	23:12	2
48	Phagwara Jn (PGW)	14:43	14:45	2	Pandaul (PDW)	23:20	23:22	2
49	Jalandhar Cantt (JRC)	14:29	14:31	2	Madhubani (MBI)	23:30	23:32	2
50	Jalandhar City (JUC)	14:15	14:20	2	Rajanagar (RJA)	23:44	23:46	2
51	Beas (BEAS)	13:33	13:35	2	Khajauli (KJI)	23:56	23:58	2
52	Amritsar Jn (ASR)	17:50	—	2	Jaynagar (JYG)	00:30	—	3

== Rake sharing ==
The train sharing its rake with 14649/14650 Saryu Yamuna Express.

== Traction ==
As sections of the route are fully electrified, it is hauled by a Ghaziabad Loco Shed / Ludhiana Loco Shed-based WAP-7 electric locomotive from Amritsar Junction to Jaynagar and vice versa.

== Operation ==
14674 Amritsar–Jaynagar Shaheed Express runs from Amritsar Junction every Thursday, Friday and Sunday reaching Jaynagar on the 3rd day.

14673 Jaynagar–Amritsar Shaheed Express runs from Jaynagar every Wednesday, Thursday and Saturday reaching Amritsar Junction on the next day.

== See also ==
- Jaynagar railway station
- Amritsar Junction railway station
- Saryu Yamuna Express
- Chhapra–Amritsar Weekly Express
