= Jaynagar railway station =

Railway station in Madhubani, Bihar, India

Jaynagar
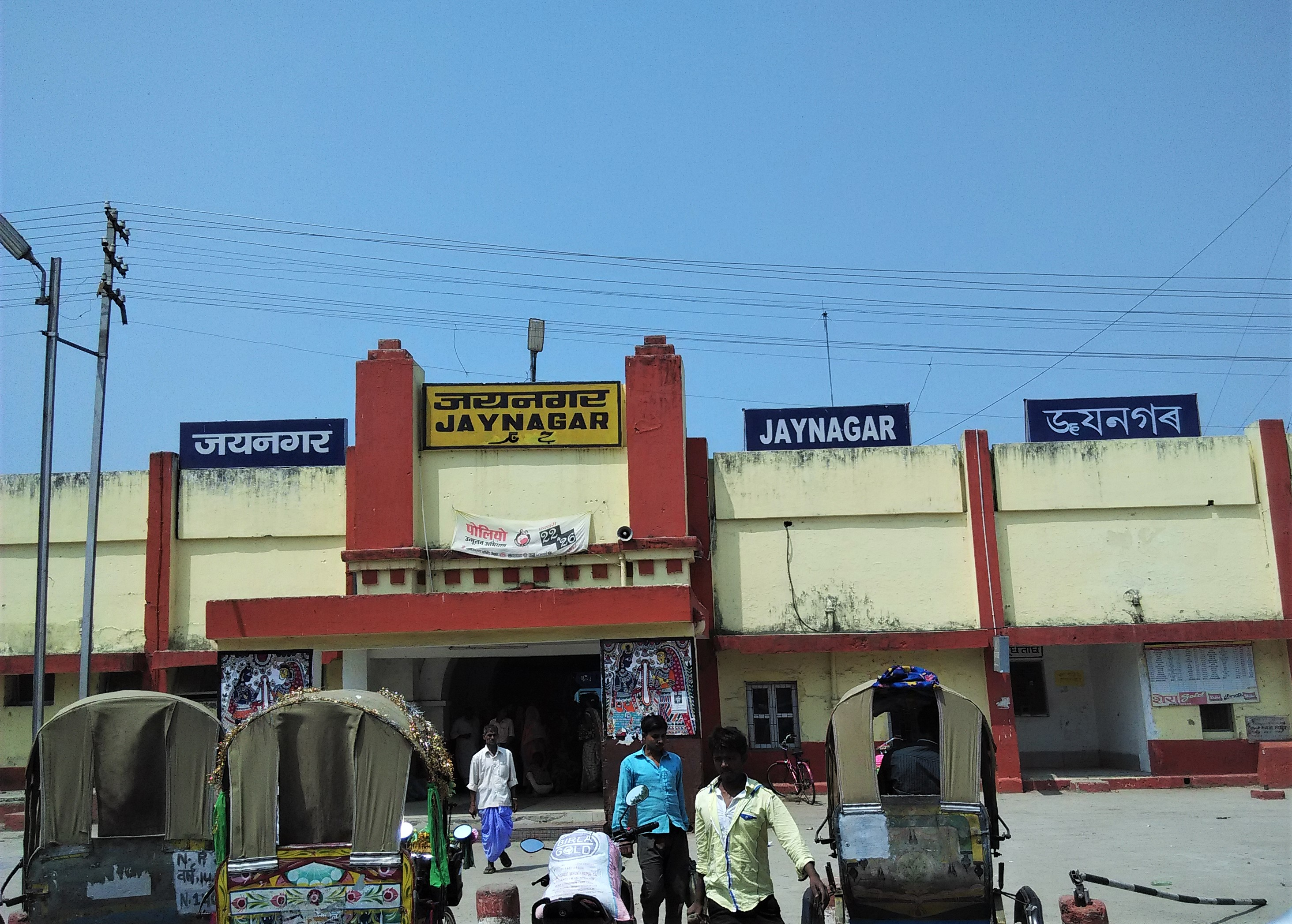
- Jaynagar Railway station

General information
- Location: Jainagar, Madhubani district, Bihar 847226; India
- Coordinates: 26.5896°N 86.1354°E
- Elevation: 73 metres (240 ft)
- System: Indian Railways station
- Owner: Indian Railways
- Operator: East Central Railway
- Line: Barauni–Gorakhpur, Raxaul and Jainagar lines
- Platforms: 5
- Tracks: 6
- Connections: Auto stand

Construction
- Structure type: Standard (on-ground station)
- Parking: Yes
- Cycle facilities: Yes

Other information
- Status: Functioning
- Station code: JYG
- Zone(s): East Central Railway
- Division(s): Samastipur

History
- Opened: 1902

Services
Preceding station	Indian Railways	Following station
Korahia towards Darbhanga or Barauni	East Central Railway zone Jainagar line	Terminus
Preceding station	Nepal Railway	Following station
Terminus	Jaynagar–Bardibas	Inarwa towards Bhangaha
Location
- Location within Bihar Location within India

Jaynagar railway station (station code: JYG), is a main terminal railway station in Madhubani district, in the Indian state of Bihar. It serves Jainagar and the surrounding areas. The station consists of 5 platforms. It maintained by Samastipur railway division of East Central Railways.

== History ==
The Jayanagar–Janakpur–Bijalpura line a 2 ft 6 in (762 mm) narrow-gauge railway was introduced during the Rana period. The Jayanagar–Janakpur–Bijalpura line was under conversion to 1,676 mm (5 ft 6 in) with an extension to Bardibas. This was Nepal's last surviving railway. Crossborder train service was inaugurated in Jaynagar — Kurtha section on 4 April 2022. As of 2025, Train service is available upto Bhangaha (Bijalpura).

== Sections ==
The Jaynagar railway station is split into two sections. One section is used by Indian Railways, the other being used by Nepal Railways. The latter operates three DEMU trains per day.

== Services ==
The following train services are available from this station:

Nepal Railways also operates three services a day. Train number NR2 UP , NR4 UP runs upto Janakpurdham and NR6 UP runs upto Bhangaha (Bijalpura).

Train No.	Train Name	Origin & Destination	Time of Departure (IST)	Time of Arrival (IST)	Running Days
15527/28	Kamla Ganga Express	Jaynagar-Patna	3.15 AM	4.10 AM	Daily
75215/16	Jaynagar-Raxaul DEMU	Jaynagar-Raxaul	3.35 AM	3.10 AM	Daily
15283/84	Janaki Intercity Express	Jaynagar-Manihari	4.45 AM	10.20 AM	Daily
18419/20	Puri–Jaynagar Express	Jaynagar-Puri	5.25 AM	12.50 PM	S
15549/50	Jaynagar–Patna Intercity Express	Jaynagar-Patna	5.25 AM		S M T W T F
14649/50	Saryu Yamuna Express	Jaynagar-Amritsar	7.20 AM	12.30 AM	S T F
14673/74	Shaheed Express	Jaynagar-Amritsar	7.20 AM	12.30 AM	M W T S
55513/14, 55519/20	Jaynagar-Samastipur Passenger	Jaynagar-Samastipur	7.55 AM, 4.30 PM	10.55 PM, 9.55 AM	Daily
13225/26	Jaynagar–Danapur Intercity Express	Jaynagar-Danapur	10.50 AM	2.50 PM	Daily
12435/36	Jaynagar–Anand Vihar Garib Rath Express	Jaynagar-Anand Vihar Terminal	12.10 PM	1.50 PM	M F
13135/36	Kolkata–Jaynagar Weekly Express	Jaynagar-Kolkata	12.40 PM	10.45 AM	S
11061/62	Pawan Express	Jaynagar-Lokmanya Tilak Terminus	1.10 PM	2.00 AM	Daily
55517/18	Jaynagar-Darbhanga Passenger	Jaynagar-Darbhanga	1.55 PM	8.55 PM	Daily
13185/86	Ganga Sagar Express	Jaynagar-Sealdah	4.10 PM	8.45 AM	Daily
12561/62	Swatantra Senani Superfast Express	Jaynagar-New Delhi	5.20 PM	7.25 PM	Daily
13031/32	Howrah–Jaynagar Express	Jaynagar-Howrah	6.35 PM	12.05 PM	Daily
18105/06	Jaynagar–Rourkela Express	Jaynagar-Rourkela	7.30 PM	11.30 AM	S W F
18119/20	Jaynagar-Tatanagar Express	Jaynagar-Tatanagar	7.30 PM	11.30 AM	S
75209/10	Jaynagar-Samastipur DEMU	Jaynagar-Samastipur	7.50 PM	6.05 PM	Daily
15553/54	Jaynagar-Bhagalpur Intercity Express	Jaynagar-Bhagalpur	8.10 PM	4.05 PM	Daily
22563/64	Jaynagar–Udhna Antyodaya Express	Jaynagar-Udhna	11.50 PM	6.30 PM	T

== Nearest airport ==
The nearest airports are (with location):

- Darbhanga Airport at Darbhanga
- Bagdogra Airport at Siliguri
- Gaya Airport at Gaya
- Lok Nayak Jayaprakash Airport at Patna
- Netaji Subhash Chandra Bose International Airport at Kolkata.

== See also ==
- Indian Railways
- Janakpur–Jaynagar Railway
- Patna Junction railway station
- Barauni–Gorakhpur, Raxaul and Jainagar lines
- Madhubani
- Transport in Bihar
- East Central Railway zone
- Samastipur railway division
- List of railway stations in India
- India–Nepal relations
- Nepal Railways
