= Samastipur railway division =

Railway division under East Central Railway zone of India

Samastipur Railway Division
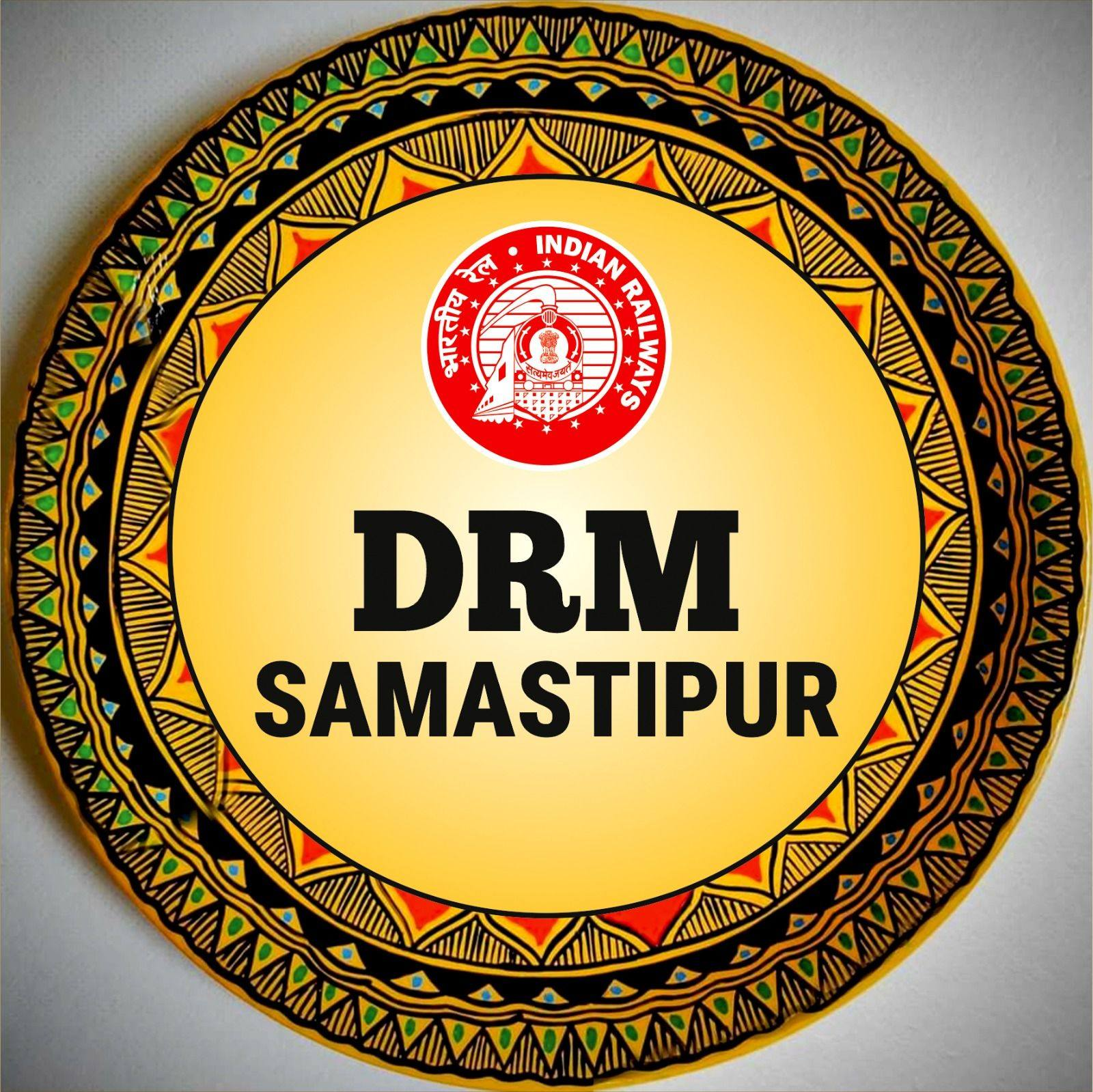

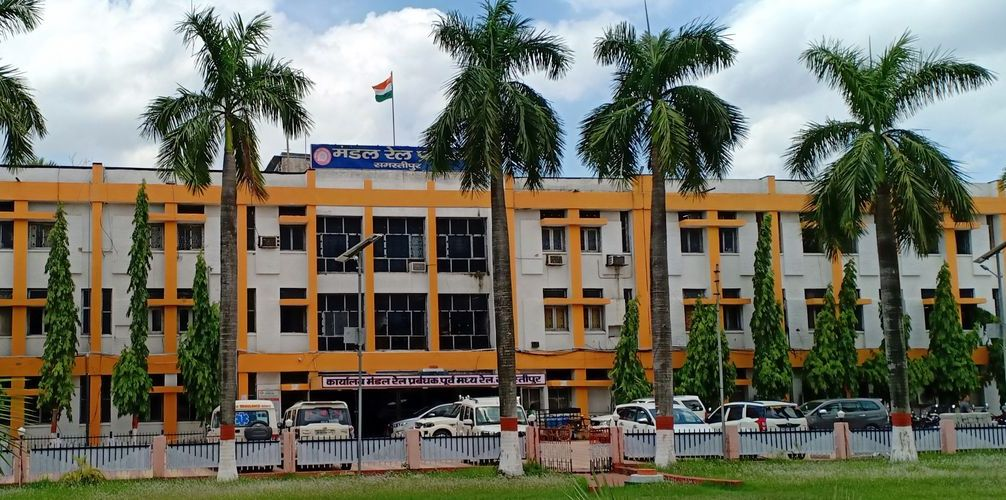
- Head Office Building

Overview
- Operator: Indian Railways
- Headquarters: Samastipur
- Locale: Bihar, India
- Dates of operation: 1969; 57 years ago–
- Predecessor: East Central Railway zone

Technical
- Track gauge: Broad gauge
- Electrification: Yes

Other
- Website: ecr.indianrailways.gov.in

Samastipur railway division is one of the five railway divisions under the East Central Railway zone of the Indian Railways. The division was established in 1969 and is headquartered at Samastipur, Bihar.

Muzaffarpur Junction is the SPJ Divison highest revenue-generating railway station

Other divisions under the East Central Railway Zone include Danapur railway division, Pandit Deen Dayal Upadhyaya railway division, Dhanbad railway division, and Sonpur railway division, all headquartered at Hajipur.

== History ==
The first railway line in North Bihar, connecting Dalsingsarai and Darbhanga via Samastipur, was built to aid relief and rehabilitation during regional famines. The 43-mile line was completed in just over six months and opened on 1 November 1875 under the Tirhut Railway, then state-owned.

On 1 July 1890, the Tirhut Railway was transferred to the privately run Bengal and North Western Railway. Lines in the area, including the Samastipur–Darbhanga–Jhanjharpur section, were later merged into the Awadh and Tirhut State Railway.

The Samastipur Railway Division serves the Tirhut and Mithila regions, which hold historical and cultural significance. Samastipur became a separate district in 1972, carved out of Darbhanga district. Originally part of the North Eastern Railway zone, the division was transferred to East Central Railway on 1 October 2002.

== Station categories ==
The division has 220 stations, categorized based on passenger earnings and importance:

| Category | Number of stations | Station names |
|---|---|---|
| NSG-2 | 3 | Muzaffarpur Junction, Darbhanga Junction, Samastipur Junction |
| NSG-3 | 9 | Saharsa Junction, Bapudham Motihari, Bettiah, Jaynagar, Madhubani, Raxaul Junction, Sakri Junction, Sitamarhi Junction, Narkatiaganj Junction |
| NSG-4 | 5 | Bagaha, Sagauli Junction, Adapur, Banmankhi Junction, Chakia |
| NSG-5 | 20 | Purnia Court, Ghorasahan, Majhowlia, Harinagar, Bairgania, Chanpatia, Dauram Madhepura, Hasanpur Road, Janakpur Road, Kamtaul, Laheriasarai, Mehsi, Motipur, Murliganj, Rajnagar, Ramgarhwa, Rusera Ghat, Salauna, Simri Bakhtiyarpur, Supaul |
| NSG-6 | 49 | Kaparpura, Chakia Halt, Chakardaha Halt, Chhatapur Road Halt, Dhamara Ghat, Deviganj, Garh Baruari, Koparia, Lalit Gram, Narpatganj, Panchgachia, Raghopur, Simri Bakhtiyarpur, Supaul, Triveniganj, Awapur Flag, Bajpatti, Benipurgram Halt, Chandauna Halt, Debrabandhauli Halt, Dumra, Garha, Jogiara, Jubbashahani, Kamtaul, Muhammadpur, Mohini Mandal, New Runisaidpur Halt, Paramjiwar Tarajivar, Parsauni, Runnisaid Pur, Sitamarhi, Tektar Flag, Angar Ghat, Bhagwanpurdesua, Bishunpur, Bithan, Kamthan, Kishanpur, Laheria Sarai, Muktapur, Singhiaghat, Naya Nagar, Olapur, Rusera Ghat, Samastipur Junction |
| HG-2 | 7 | Baba Raghuni Dwarika, Deviganj, Fungo Halt, Thalwara, Muraitha Halt, Baraipura Halt, Shasan Halt |
| HG-3 | 52 | Ramrupnagar Halt, Asanpur Kupha Halt, Badla Ghat, Beena Ekma, Chandpipar Halt, Chhatapur Road Halt, Kadampura Halt, Karukhirharnagar Halt, Lalit Gram, Nandlalee Halt, Narayanpur Murli Halt, Ram Bishanpur Halt, Sonbarsa Kacheri, Thumha, Sunderpur Halt, Bachharpur Halt, Bhisa Halt, Mabbi Halt, Paharja Gangaur Halt, Tapaswinarayan Nagar, Jogiara, Baba Raghuni Dwarika Halt, Ramrupnagar, Asanpur Kupha, Badla Ghat Halt, Beena Ekma Halt, Chandpipar, Chhatapur Road, Kadampura, Karukhirharnagar, Lalit Gram Halt, Nandlalee, Narayanpur Murli, Ram Bishanpur, Sonbarsa, Thumha Halt, Sunderpur, Bachharpur, Bhisa, Mabbi, Paharja Gangaur, Tapaswinarayan, Jogiara Halt |
| Total | 220 | |

== Route length and electrification ==
The total route length of the division is 1,295.96 km, with 1,251.74 km electrified. The remaining 44.22 km is non-electrified.

=== Track configuration ===
| Track type | Length (km) |
|---|---|
| Single line | 1,028.66 |
| Double line | 254.03 |

- Closed section:* GAH–BKF (13.27 km) is currently closed for gauge conversion.

== Coaching and maintenance ==
Depots in the division maintain inspection pits and perform primary and secondary maintenance of express and passenger trains to ensure safety and punctuality.

=== Examination pits ===
| Depot | No. of pits | Pit no. | Pit length (m) | Coach capacity |
|---|---|---|---|---|
| RXL | 2 | 1,2 | 600, 538 | 26, 23 |
| DBG | 2 | 1,2 | 596, 541 | 26, 24 |
| JYG | 1 | 1 | 580 | 25 |
| SHC | 2 | 1 | 550 | 24 |
| SPJ | 2 | 1,2 | 575, 592 | 25, 25 |
| MFP | 2 | 1,2 | 549.5, 496 | 24, 22 |

=== Maintenance of Express and Passenger trains ===
| Depot | Primary maintenance | Secondary maintenance | Total trains | Rakes maintained |
|---|---|---|---|---|
| SPJ | 1 | 2 | 8 | 0 |
| DBG | 11 | 1 | 16 | 3 |
| JYG | 5 | | 9 | 1 |
| RXL | 6 | 1 | 9 | 2 |
| SHC | 7 | | 9 | 2 |
| MFP | 7 | | 8 | 5 |
| Total | 37 | 4 | 59 | 13 |

== Primary trains of SPJ ==
=== Muzaffarpur Depot primary trains ===
| Train Type | Train no./name | Days of run | From–To | No. of rakes |
|---|---|---|---|---|
| LHB Mail/Exp | Sapt Kranti Express | Daily | MFP–ANVT | 3 |
| LHB Mail/Exp | Muzaffarpur–SMVT Bengaluru Weekly Express | Weekly | MFP–SMVB | 1 |
| LHB Mail/Exp | Howrah–Muzaffarpur Jan Sadharan Express | Weekly | MFP–HWH | 1 |
| LHB Mail/Exp | Muzaffarpur – Sabarmati Jan Sadharan Express | Weekly | MFP–SABARMATI | 1 |
| Amrit Bharat Mail/Exp | Muzaffarpur–Charlapalli Amrit Bharat Express | Weekly | MFP–CHZ | 1 |
| Amrit Bharat Mail/Exp | Bapudham Motihari – Anand Vihar Terminal Amrit Bharat Express | Twice a week | MFP–ANVT | 1 |
| LHB Mail/Exp | Muzaffarpur–Hadapsar (Pune) AC Express | Mon | MFP–HDP | 1 |

=== Darbhanga Depot primary trains ===
| Train type | Train no./name | Days of run | From–To | No. of rakes |
|---|---|---|---|---|
| LHB Mail/Exp | 15211/15212 Jannayak | Daily | DBG–ASR | 42 |
| LHB/AB SF | 15557/15558 Amrit Bharat | Mon, Thu | DBG–ANVT | 13 |
| LHB/AB SF | 15561/15561 Amrit Bharat | Thu | DBG–GTNR | 4 |
| LHB SF | 12565/12566 Bihar Sampark Kranti | Daily | DBG–NDLS | 35 |
| LHB SF | 12577/12578 Bagmati | Tue | DBG–MYSURU | 16 |
| LHB Mail/Exp | 15233/15234 Maithili Exp | Wed, Sun | DBG–KOAA | 17 |
| LHB Mail/Exp | 15235/15236 Howrah Weekly | Fri | DBG–HWH | 8 |
| LHB Mail/Exp | 15559/15560 Ahmedabad Jansadharan | Wed | DBG–ADI | 19 |
| LHB SF | 22551/22552 Jalandhar Antodaya | Sat | DBG–JUC | 110 |
| LHB Mail/Exp | 15551/15552 Varanasi Antodaya | Wed | DBG–BCY | 11 |
| LHB Mail/Exp | 02569/02570 New Delhi Clone Spl | Daily | DBG–NDLS | 312 |

=== Raxaul Depot primary trains ===
| Train type | Train no./name | Days of run | From–To | No. of rakes |
|---|---|---|---|---|
| LHB Mail/Exp | 12545/12546 Mumbai LTT Karambhoomi | Thu | RXL–LTT | 2 |
| LHB Mail/Exp | 22553/22554 2 Mumbai LTT Spl | Mon | RXL–LTT | 3 |
| LHB Mail/Exp | 15267/15268 Mumbai LTT Spl | Sat | RXL–LTT | 4 |
| LHB Mail/Exp | 15273/15274 Satyagrah Exp | Daily | RXL–ANVT | 35 |
| ICF Pass | 55587/55588 RXL–NKE | Daily | RXL–NKE | 26 |
| ICF Mail/Exp | 15501/15502 RXL–Jogbani | Mon, Thu | RXL–JBN | 17 |
| LHB Mail/Exp | 05559/05560 RXL–UDN Spl | Sat | RXL–UDN | 1 |

=== Jaynagar Depot primary trains ===
| Train type | Train no./name | Days of run | From–To | No. of rakes |
|---|---|---|---|---|
| LHB SF | 12561/12562 Swatantrata Senani | Daily | JYG–NDLS | 32 |
| ICF Mail/Exp | 15284/15283 Janki Exp | Daily | JYG–MHI | 23 |
| LHB Mail/Exp | 15549/15550 Patna Intercity Spl | Daily except Sun | JYG–PNBE | 14 |
| LHB SF | 22563/22564 Udhna Antodaya Spl | Thu | JYG–UDN | 15 |
| LHB Mail/Exp | 15553/15554 Jaynagar–Bhagalpur | Daily | JYG–BGP | 21 |

=== Saharsa Depot primary trains ===
| Train type | Train no./name | Days of run | From–To | No. of rakes |
|---|---|---|---|---|
| LHB SF | 15565/15566 Vaishali Sup.Exp | Daily | LLPN–DLS | 4 |
| LHB Mail/Exp | 15280/15279 Poorabiya Exp | Sun & Thu | SHC–ANVT | 13 |
| LHB Mail/Exp | 15509/15510 Rajyarani Exp | Daily | LLP–PNBE | 14 |
| LHB Mail/Exp | 15505/15506 Janhit Exp | Daily | SHC–PPTA | 15 |
| ICF Mail/Exp | 15530/15529 Jan Sadharan | Wed | SHC–ANVT | 16 |
| ICF Mail/Exp | 15532/15531 Jan Sadharan | Sun | SHC–ASR | 7 |
| LHB Mail/Exp | 22351/22552 Patliputra Spl Fare | Fri | SHC–SMVT | 11 |

=== Samastipur Depot primary trains ===
| Train type | Train no./name | Days of run | From–To | No. of rakes |
|---|---|---|---|---|
| ICF Mail/Exp | 55513/55514 Jaynagar Exp Spl | Daily | SPJ–JYG | 52 |
| ICF Pass | 55565/55566 SPJ–SHC Exp Spl | Daily | SPJ–SHC | 13 |
| ICF Pass | 75249/75250 Amha Pipra Pass | Daily | SPJ–SHC | 21 |
