= Sakri Junction railway station =

Railway station in Madhubani, Bihar, India

Sakri Junction
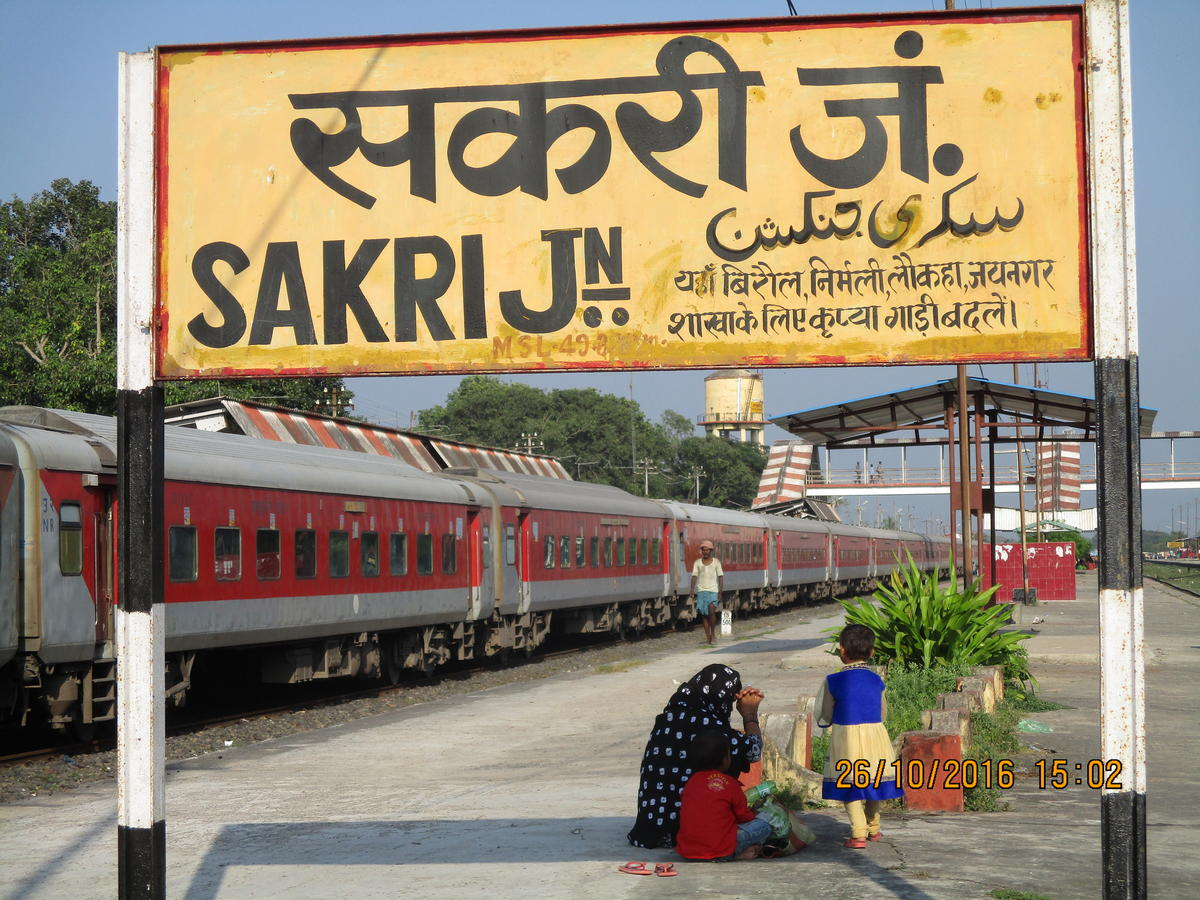
- Board of Sakri Junction Railway Station

General information
- Location: Station Road, Near East-West Corridor [NH 57], Madhubani, Bihar; India
- Coordinates: 26°12′31.4″N 86°04′38.5″E
- Elevation: 58.00 metres (190.29 ft)
- System: Junction Indian Railways station
- Owner: Indian Railways
- Operator: East Central Railway zone
- Platforms: 3
- Tracks: 1

Other information
- Status: Functional
- Station code: SKI
- Zone(s): East Central Railways
- Division(s): Samastipur

History
- Opened
Location
- Location within Bihar
- Interactive map

Sakri Junction (SKI) is the railway station serving the city of Madhubani in the Madhubani district in the Indian state of Bihar. This railway station is known as one of the Indian Railway's top 100 teach price ticket and train travel stations. In total, 72 trains pass through the Sakri Jn (SKI) junction.

Three lines diverge from this station: (1) SKI-JYG(JAYNAGAR), (2) SKI-SHC(SAHARSA) through Jhanjharpur-Nirmali (3) SKI-HRGR(HARNAGAR)

== Platforms ==
There are three platforms in Sakri Junction. The platforms are interconnected with foot overbridges.

== Nearest airport ==
The nearest airport to Darbhanga Junction is

- Darbhanga Airport, Darbhanga
- Lok Nayak Jayaprakash Airport, Patna
- Gaya Airport, Gaya

== See also ==
- Darbhanga Junction
- Samastipur Junction
- Muzaffarpur Junction
- Madhubani railway station
- Jaynagar railway station
