= Samastipur Junction railway station =

Railway station in Samastipur, Bihar, India

SAMASTIPUR JUNCTION

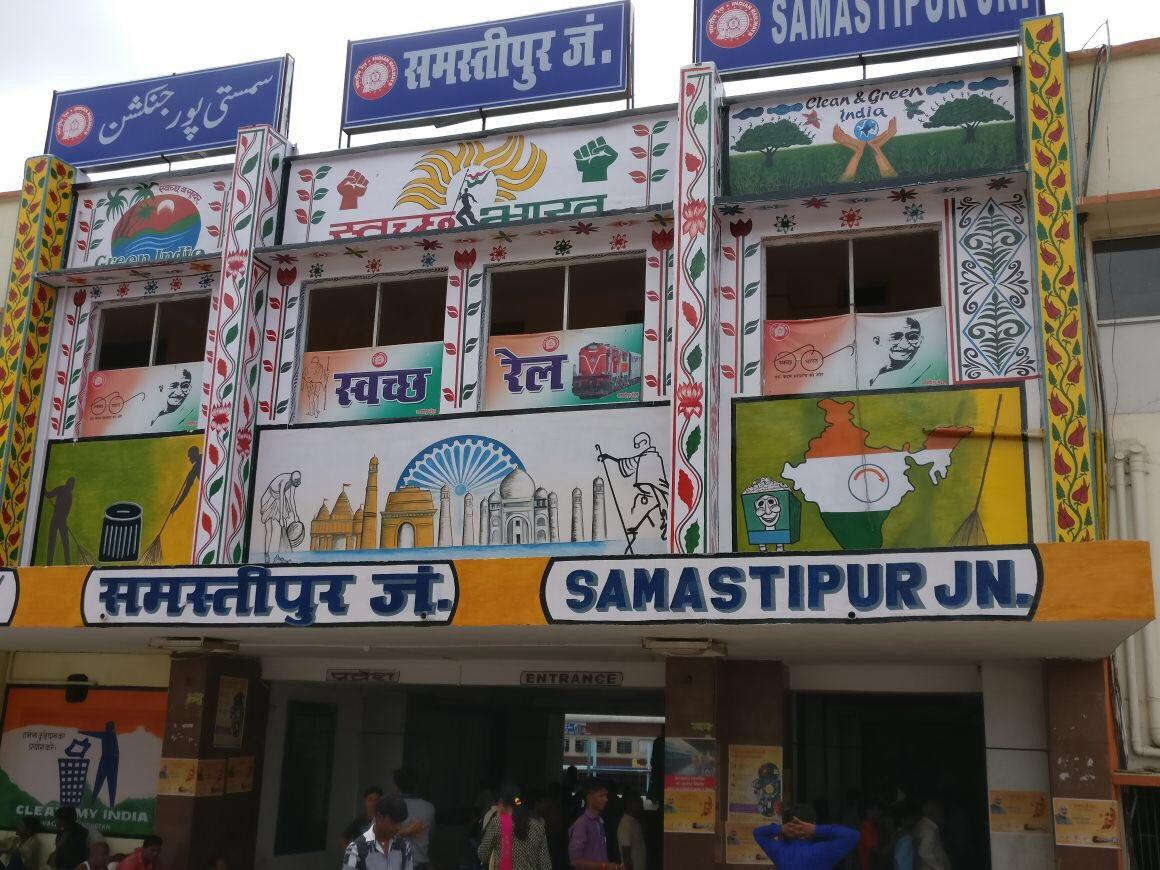
- Samastipur Junction Main Gate

General information
- Location: Samastipur, Bihar; India
- Coordinates: 25.859983°N 85.786351°E
- Elevation: 46.54 metres (152.7 ft)
- System: Indian Railways station
- Owner: Indian Railways
- Operator: East Central Railways
- Lines: Barauni–Gorakhpur line; Barauni–Raxaul and Jainagar Lines; Samastipur–Khagaria Loop Line; Barauni–Samastipur section; Samastipur–Muzaffarpur section
- Platforms: 7
- Tracks: 15

Construction
- Structure type: Standard (on-ground station)
- Parking: Available
- Accessible: Yes

Other information
- Status: Functioning
- Station code: SPJ
- Zone(s): East Central Railway
- Division(s): Samastipur

History
- Opened: 1875
- Electrified: 2014

Passengers
- 3 lakh per day
Location
- Location within Bihar Location within India
- Interactive map

Samastipur Junction (station code: SPJ) is a major railway station in Bihar, India, under the East Central Railway zone (ECR). It is one of the busiest junctions in North Bihar and serves as the headquarters of the Samastipur railway division. The station is strategically located and acts as a gateway to the Mithila region and parts of North Bihar. This station is NSG-2 category station. Muzaffarpur and Darbhanga are other two NSG-2 category stations of SPJ division. This station is among top 10 highest revenue earning stations in ECR.

== Railway lines ==
Samastipur Junction is a major railway junction where several broad-gauge lines converge. The routes branching from the station are as follows:

Line	Route	Major destinations
Barauni–Gorakhpur line	Samastipur → Hajipur → Chhapra → Siwan → Gorakhpur	Hajipur, Chhapra, Siwan, Gorakhpur
Samastipur–Darbhanga line	Samastipur → Darbhanga → Jaynagar / Nirmali	Darbhanga, Madhubani, Jaynagar
Samastipur–Muzaffarpur–Raxaul line	Samastipur → Muzaffarpur → Motihari → Raxaul	Muzaffarpur, Motihari, Raxaul (Nepal border)
Samastipur–Khagaria–Munger–Bhagalpur line	Samastipur → Khagaria → Munger → Bhagalpur → Sahibganj	Khagaria, Munger, Bhagalpur, Sahibganj, Howrah
Samastipur–Sitamarhi line	Samastipur → Janakpur Road → Sitamarhi → Raxaul	Sitamarhi, Raxaul
Samastipur–Patna line	Samastipur → Dalsinghsarai → Hajipur → Patna	Dalsinghsarai, Hajipur, Patna
Samastipur–Katihar line	Samastipur → Saharsa → Purnia → Katihar → Guwahati	Saharsa, Purnia, Katihar, Northeast India

== Facilities ==
The major facilities available are waiting rooms, a retiring room, computerised reservation facility, a reservation counter and vehicle parking etc. The vehicles are allowed to enter the station premises. There are refreshment rooms with vegetarian and non-vegetarian food items, a tea stall, book stall, post and telegraphic office and Government Railway Police (G.R.P.) office. Automatic ticket vending machines have been installed to reduce the queue for train tickets at the station. The station is also equipped with free Wi-Fi. The station also has recently been equipped with lifts at both ends of the station.

=== Platforms ===
There are seven platforms at Samastipur Junction. The platforms are interconnected with two foot overbridges (FOB). Platform 3,4 and 5 are the busiest platforms and are mostly used for long-haul trains.
