= Darbhanga Junction railway station =

Railway station in Bihar, India

Darbhanga Junction
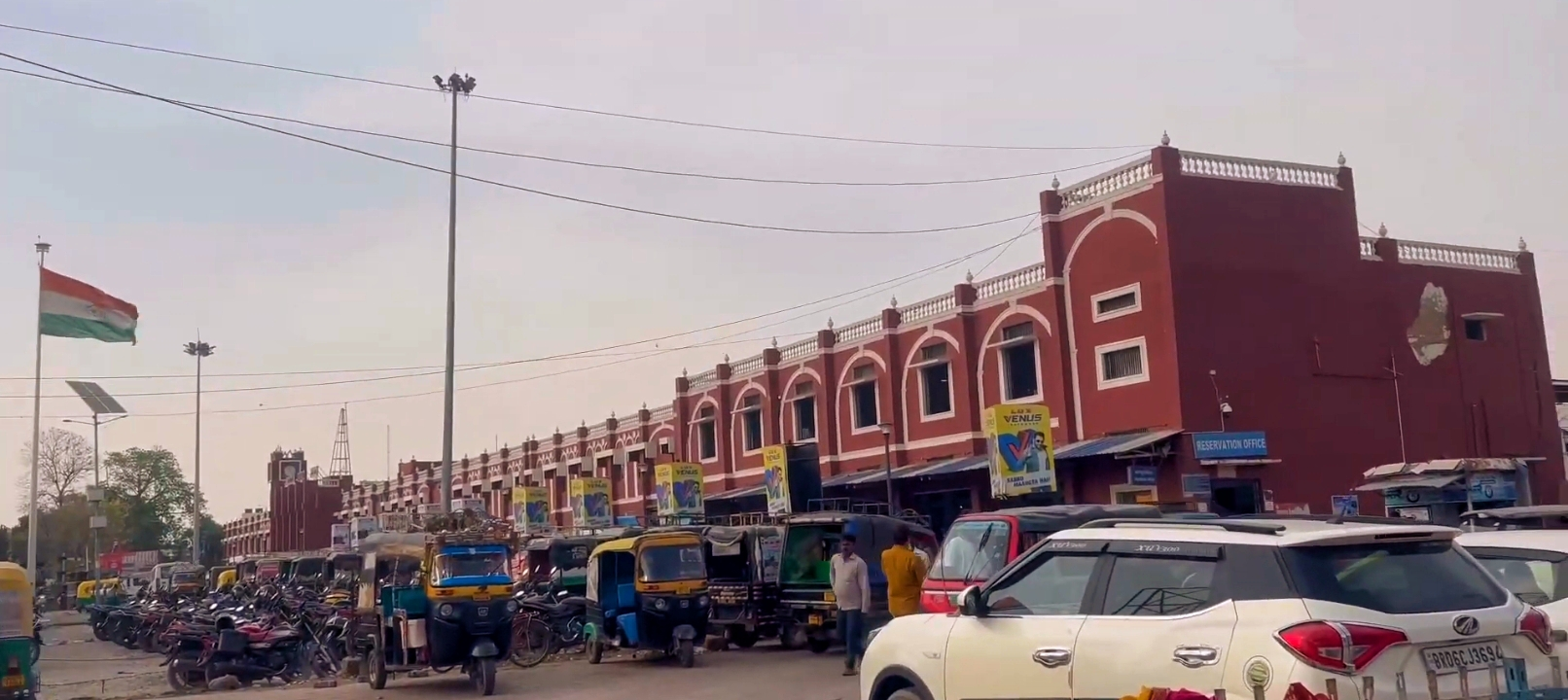
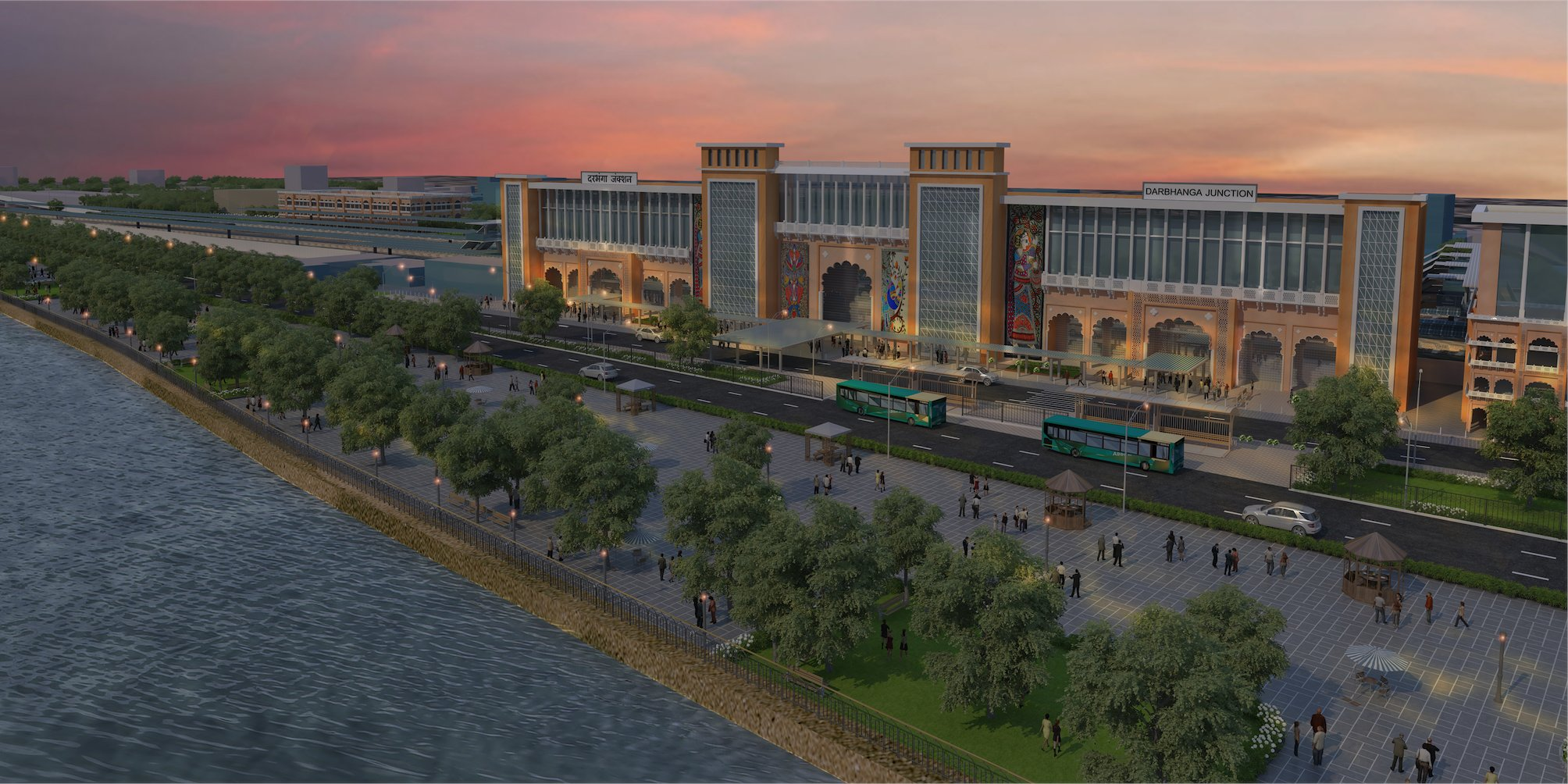
- Outside view of Darbhanga railway station Darbhanga Junction after Redevelopment (Proposed)

General information
- Location: Station Road, Kathalbari, Darbhanga, Bihar, India
- Coordinates: 26°9′20″N 85°54′27″E
- Elevation: 57.00 metres (187.01 ft)
- System: Indian Railways station
- Owner: Indian Railways
- Operator: East Central Railway zone
- Lines: Barauni–Gorakhpur, Raxaul and Jainagar lines; Samastipur-Darbhanga section; Darbhanga-Saharsa section; Darbhanga-Muzaffarpur section; Darbhanga-Sitamarhi section; Darbhanga-Madhubani section
- Platforms: 5 + 1 (under construction)
- Tracks: 8

Construction
- Parking: Available

Other information
- Status: Functional
- Station code: DBG
- Zone(s): East Central Railways
- Division(s): Samastipur

History
- Opened: 1892; 134 years ago
- Electrified: Yes
- Former names: Harahi station

Passengers
- 60 Thousands per day (approx)
Location
- Location within Bihar Location within India
- Interactive map

Darbhanga Junction railway station (station code: DBG) is an A1 category railway station serving Darbhanga city in the Indian state of Bihar. It is an important station under the East Central Railway Zone of Indian Railways and acts as a major railway hub in the Mithila region.

The station has 1,676 mm (5 ft 6 in) broad gauge tracks with 6 platforms and 8 tracks. It connects Darbhanga with major cities such as Delhi, Patna, Kolkata, and Varanasi. Important trains like the Satyagrah Express and Mithila Express operate from the station.

Darbhanga city is mainly served by two railway stations: Darbhanga and Laheriasarai.

== Redevelopment ==
A major redevelopment of Darbhanga Junction railway station has been planned by Indian Railways as part of the station modernization programme aimed at improving passenger amenities and increasing operational capacity.

The redevelopment project is estimated to cost aroun ₹340 crore and covers approximately seven acres of railway land.

The redevelopment plan includes construction of new station buildings on both the eastern and western sides of the station complex. The eastern terminal building is planned as a ground-plus-two-storey structure, while the western terminal building is proposed as a ground-plus-five-storey building. These buildings are intended to house ticketing halls, passenger waiting areas, administrative offices and commercial spaces.

Other proposed facilities include a large air concourse for passenger circulation, multi-level car parking, improved station forecourts, and modern passenger amenities such as escalators, lifts, waiting lounges, retail outlets and food courts. Additional infrastructure such as residential buildings for railway staff and barracks for the Railway Protection Force (RPF) are also planned as part of the project.

This station is now under the Amrit Bharat redevelopment scheme to make world-class facility to make the station look like an airport.

== Facilities ==
Darbhanga Junction Railway Station offers a range of facilities designed to cater to the needs of travelers. The station features multiple platforms to handle a variety of train services efficiently. For passenger comfort, it provides separate air conditioned waiting rooms along with free WiFi facility where travelers can rest before their journeys. There are refreshment stalls and IRCTC food court offering snacks and beverages to keep passengers nourished during their wait. Ticketing services are available through Automatic Ticket Vending Machines and counters where travelers can purchase or inquire about tickets. Additionally, the station includes basic amenities such as clean restrooms and seating areas. The ongoing modernization efforts aim to further enhance these facilities, ensuring a more comfortable and efficient experience for all passengers.

== Platforms ==
Darbhanga Junction has six platforms that handle passenger and express train services. The platforms are used for trains operating on major routes connecting Darbhanga with cities such as Delhi, Patna, Muzaffarpur, Saharsa, Sitamarhi, and Jaynagar.

== Trains ==
Some trains labelled E.g 05509x is an Exam Special(Operating during announcement of E.g NEET exam)

Sl. No.	Train No.	Train Name	Originate / Terminate				
1	15211 / 15212	Jannayak Express	Darbhanga – Amritsar Junction				
2	15557 / 15558	Amrit Bharat Express	Darbhanga – Anand Vihar Terminal				
3	15561 / 15562	Amrit Bharat	Darbhanga – Gomti Nagar railway station				
4	12565 / 12566	Bihar Sampark Kranti Express	Darbhanga – New Delhi railway station				
5	12577 / 12578	Bhagmati Express	Darbhanga – Mysuru Junction				
6	15233 / 15234	Maithili Express	Darbhanga – Kolkata Chitpur railway station				
7	15235 / 15236	Howrah Express	Darbhanga – Howrah Junction				
8	15559 / 15560	Ahmedabad Antyodaya	Darbhanga – Ahmedabad Junction				
9	22551 / 22552	Jalandhar Antyodaya	Darbhanga – Jalandhar City Junction				
10	15551 / 15552	Varanasi City Antyodaya	Darbhanga – Varanasi City				
11	02569 / 02570	New Delhi Clone Special	Darbhanga – New Delhi railway station				
12	17007 / 17008	Darbhanga–Secunderabad Express	Darbhanga – Secunderabad				
13	19165 / 19166	Sabarmati Express	Darbhanga – Ahmedabad				
14	09465 / 09466	Clone Special	Darbhanga – Ahmedabad				
15	19623 / 19624	Amrit Bharat	Darbhanga – Madar				
16	11034 / 11033	Pune Express	Darbhanga – Pune				
17	03043 / 03044	Howrah Puja Spl	Howrah - Raxaul				
18	04651 / 04652	Amritsar Clone Spl	Jayanagar - Amritsar				
19	08105 / 08106	Jhanjharpur Holi Special	Ranchi - Jhanjharpur				
20	08109 / 08110	Santgrachi Holi Special	Darbhanga - Santgrachi				
21	05509x / 05510x	Darbhanga Indore Exam Special	Darbhanga - Indore				
22	11061 / 11062	Pawan Express	Mumbai LTT to Jaynagar				
23	12435 / 12436	Garib Rath Express	Jaynagar - Anand Vihar Terminal(Delhi)				
24	12545 / 12546	LTT Karmabhumi Express(Unreserved)	Raxaul-Mumbai LTT				
25	12561 / 12562	Swatranta Senani Express	Jaynagar- New Delhi				
26	13031 / 13032	Howrah Jayanagar Express	Howrah - Jaynagar				
27	13043 / 13044	Raxaul Express	Howrah - Raxaul				
28	13135 / 13136	Jaynagar Kolkata Weekly Express	Jaynagar - Kolkata				
29	13155 / 13156	Mithilanchal Express	Sitamarhi - Kolkata				
30	13165 / 13166	Kolkata Express	Sitamarhi - Kolkata				
31	13185 / 13186	Gangasagar Express	Sealdah-Kolkata				
32	13211 / 13212	Jogbani Intercity	Danapur - Jogbani				
33	13225 / 13226	Ara Intercity	Jaynagar - Ara				
34	14649 / 14650	Saryu Yamuna Express	Jaynagar - Amritsar				
35	14673 / 14674	Shaheed Express	Jaynagar- Amritsar				
36	15283 / 15284	Janki Express	Manihari - Jaynagar				
37	15501 / 15502	Jogbani Express	Raxaul - Jogbani				
38	15507 / 15508	Pataliputra MEMU Intercity	Darbhanga - Pataliputra				
39	15527 / 15528	Kamla Ganga Express	Patna Junction - Jaynagar				
40	15549 / 15550	Patna Intercity	Patna - Jaynagar				
41	15553 / 15554	Bhagalpur - Darbhanga Express	Bhagalpur-Darbhanga	42	15655 / 15656	Kamakhya Weekly Express	Shri Mata Vaishnodevi Katra
43	17005 / 17006	Hyderabad Raxaul Express	Hyderabad-Raxaul				
44	18105 / 18106	Jaynagar Express	Rourkela-Jaynagar				
45	18119 / 18120	Tatanagar Express	Tatanagar-Jaynagar				
46	18419 / 18420	Puri Express	Puri-Jaynagar				
47	22553 / 22554	Udhna Antyodaya Express	Udhna-Jaynagar				

== Nearest airport ==
The Nearest Airports to Darbhanga Junction are :

- Darbhanga Airport, Darbhanga
- Jay Prakash Narayan Airport, Patna
- Gaya Airport, Gaya

== See also ==
- Samastipur Junction
- Muzaffarpur Junction
- Gaya Junction
- Patna Junction
- Bhagalpur Junction

== Gallery ==
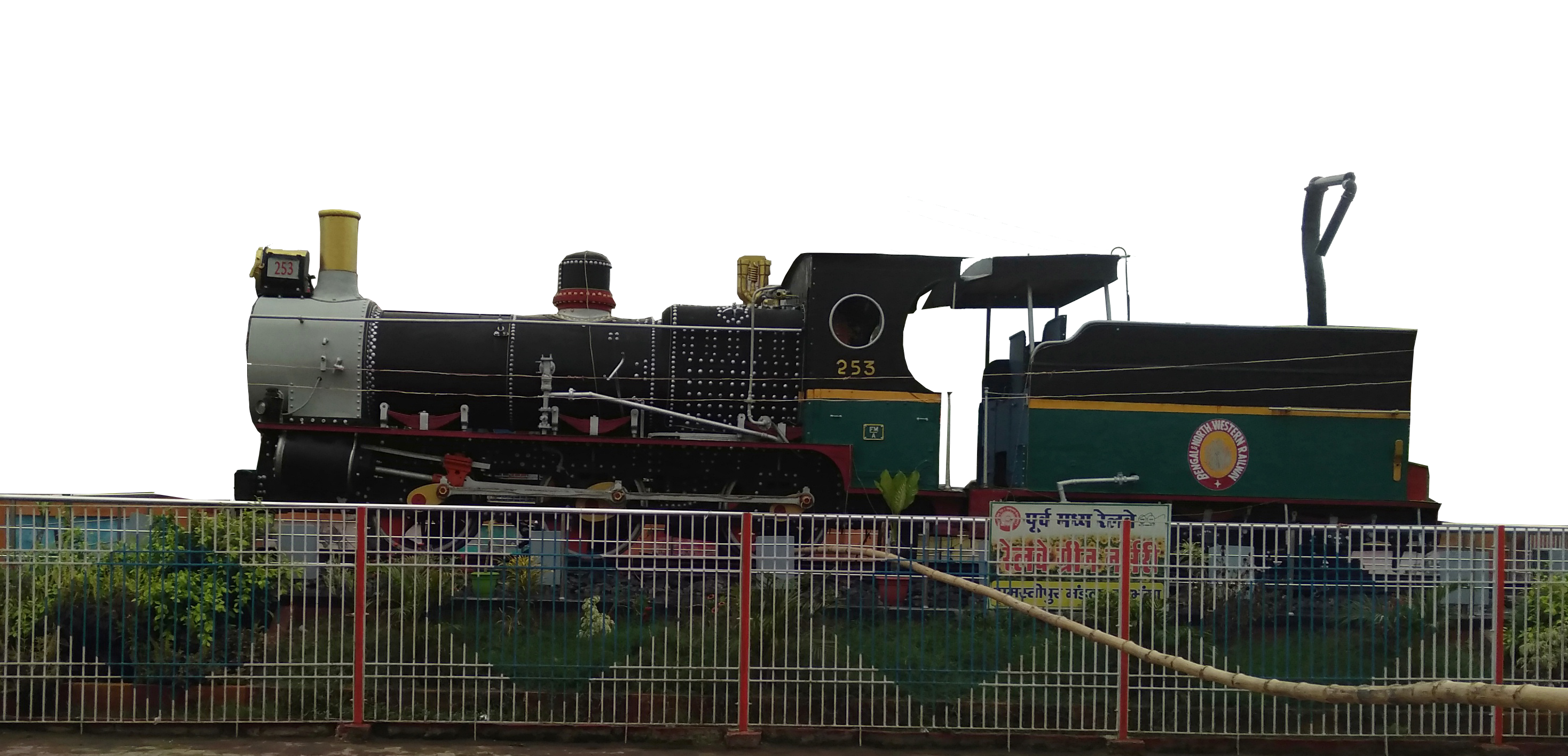
105-year-old historic steam rail engine installed at Darbhanga station

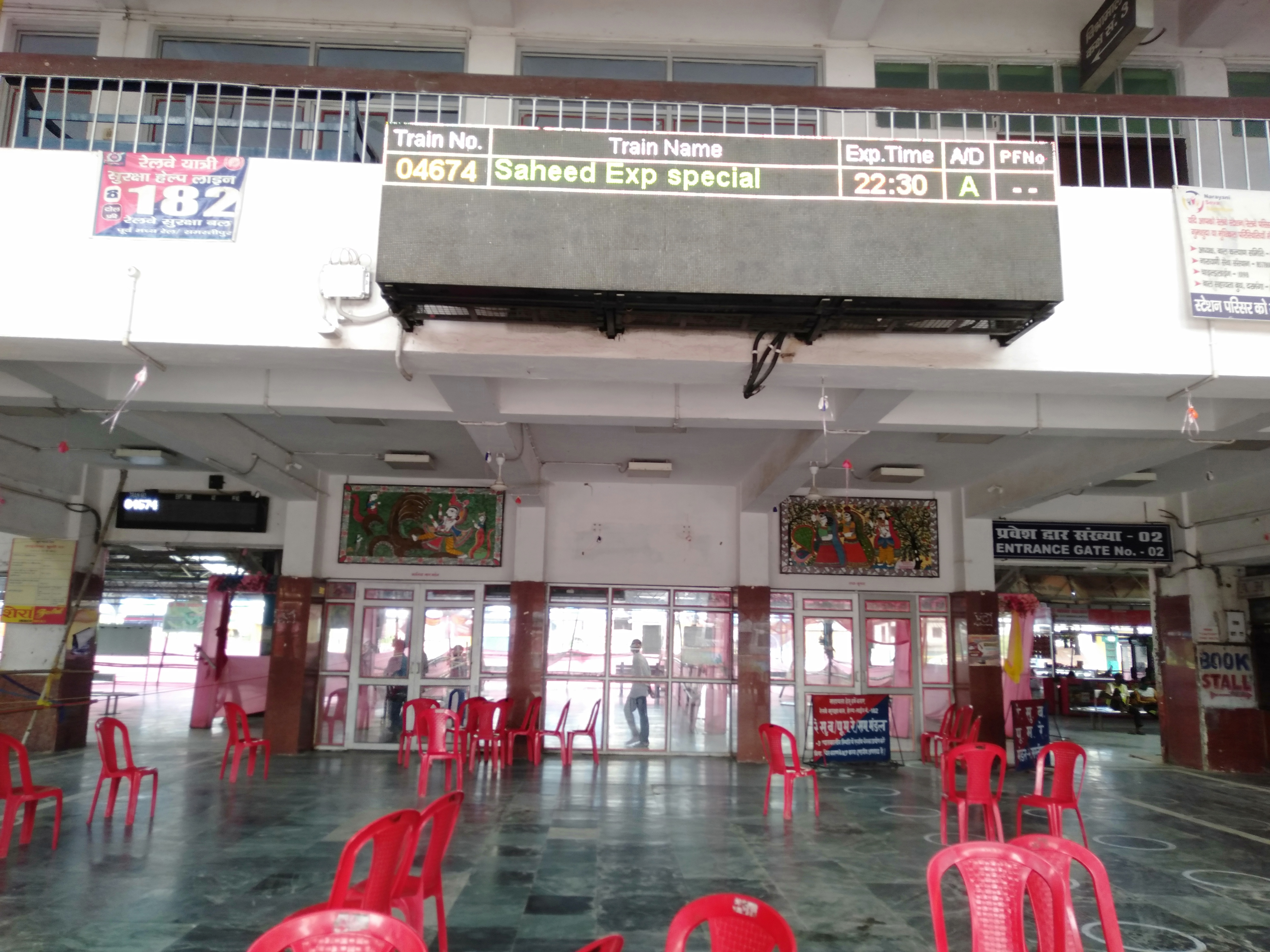
Entry view of Darbhanga Junction railway station

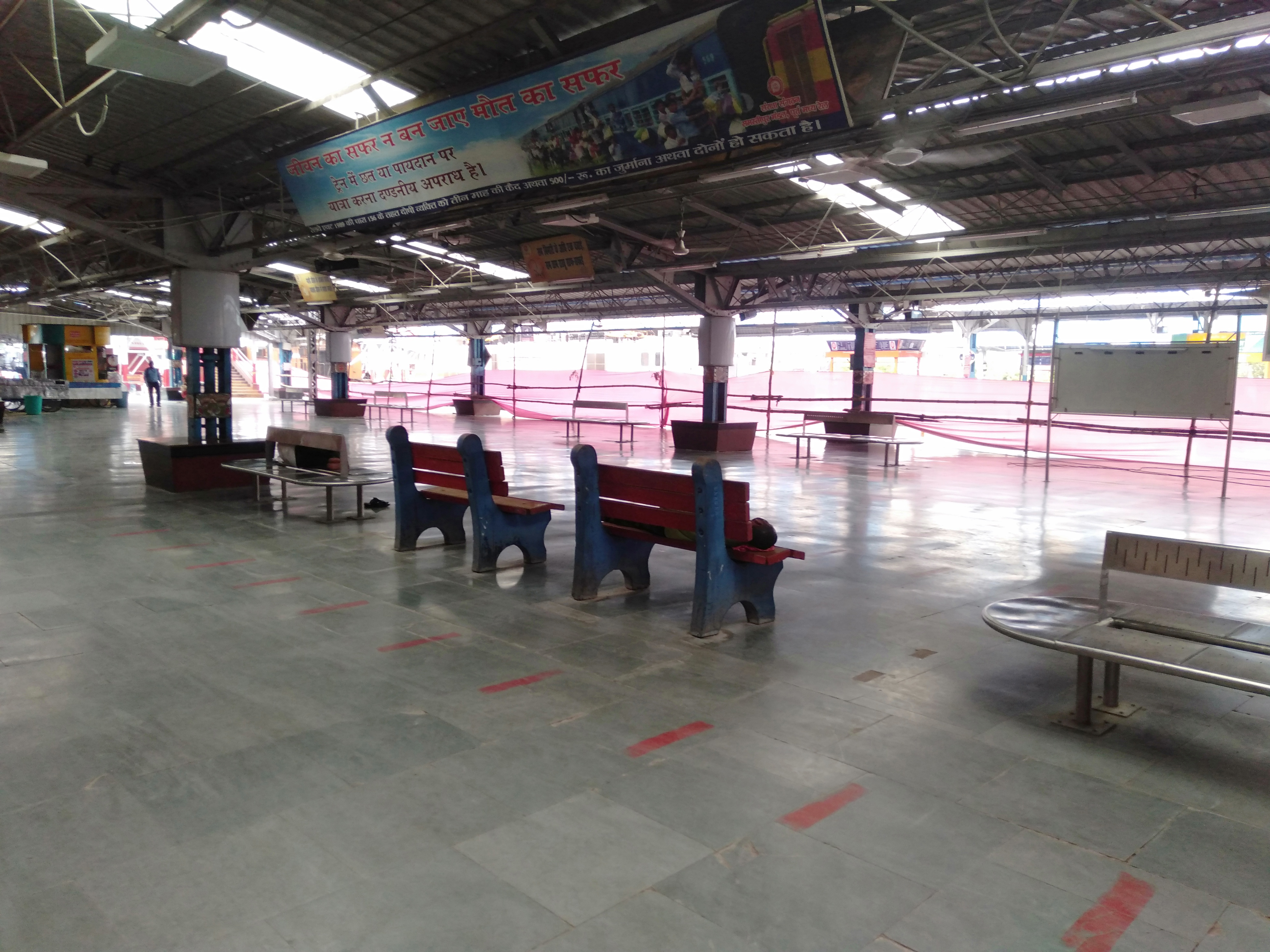
View of Platforms No. 1 Darbhanga Junction railway station

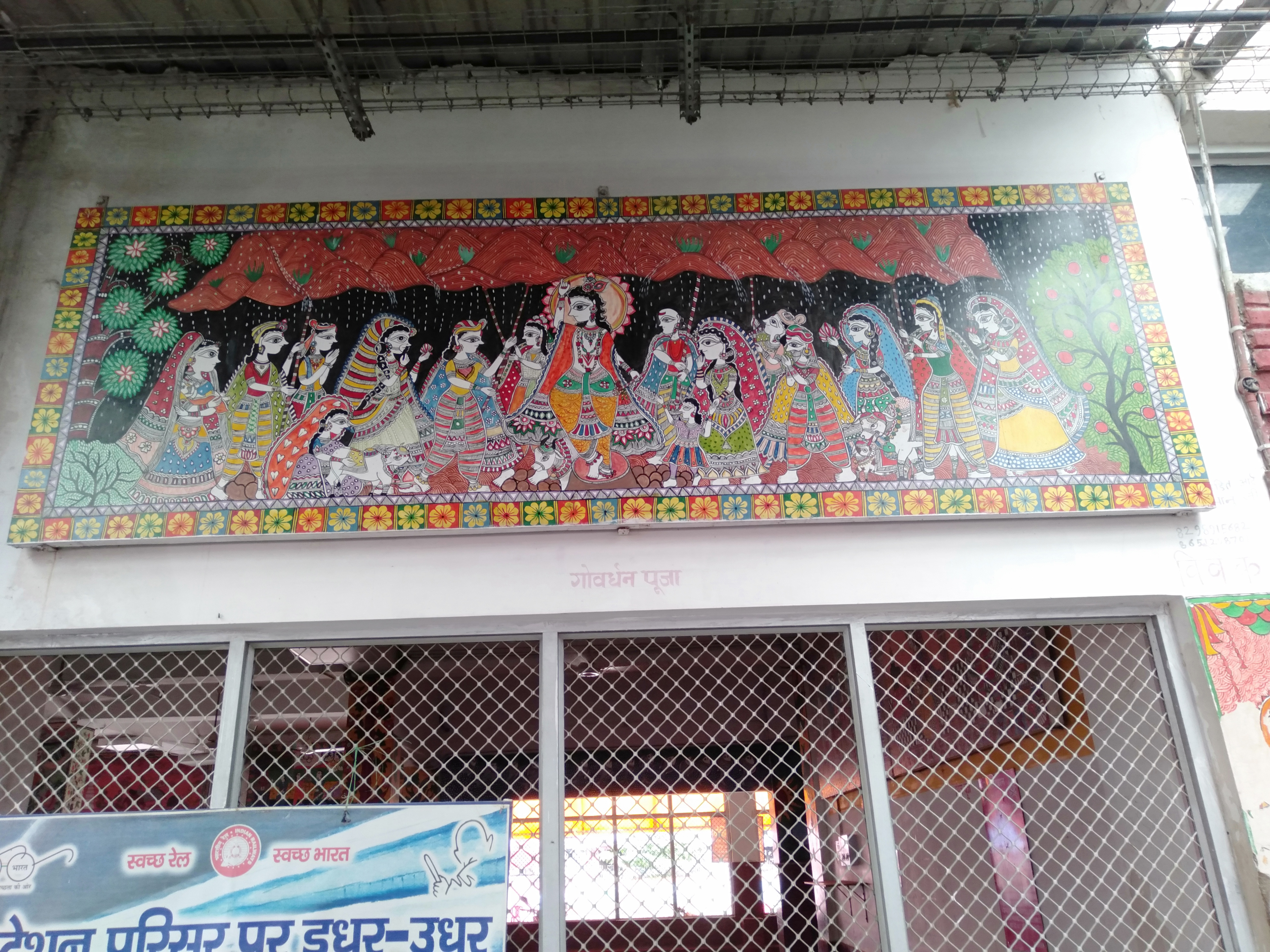
Mithila painting inside Darbhanga Junction railway station

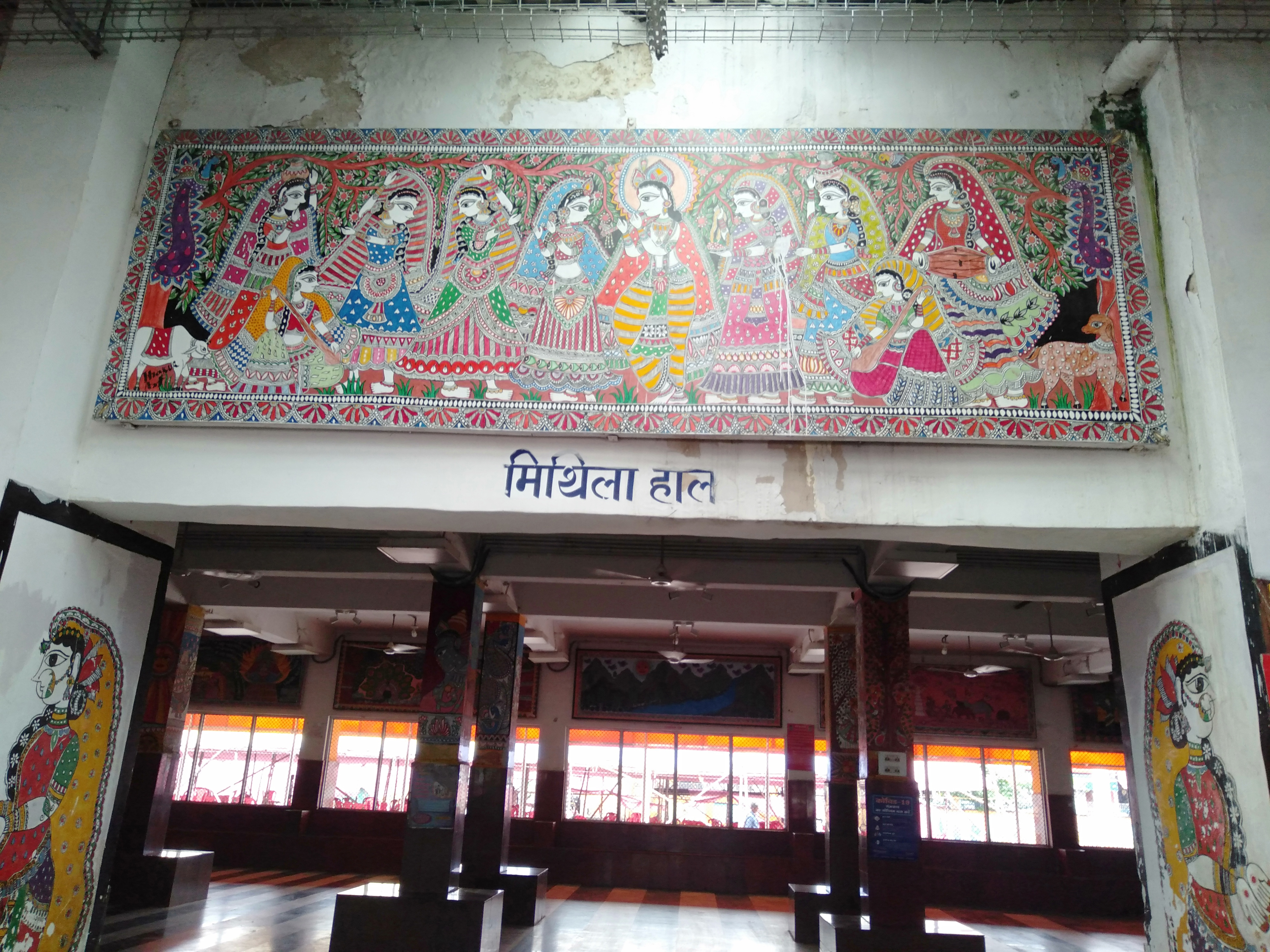
Mithila Hall at Darbhanga Junction railway station
