= Digha Bridge Halt railway station =

Railway station in Bihar

DIGHA BRIDGE HALT

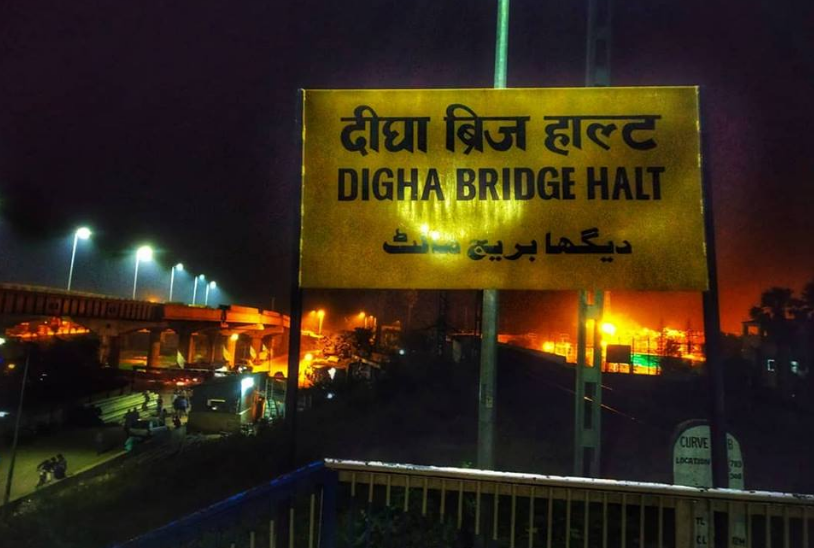
- Station board

General information
- Location: Bankipur–Danapur Road, Digha, Patna, Bihar; India
- Coordinates: 25.646334°N 85.080109°E
- Elevation: 56 metres (184 ft)
- System: Indian Railways station
- Owner: Indian Railways
- Operator: East Central Railway
- Line: Patna–Sonepur–Hajipur section
- Platforms: 1
- Tracks: 1
- Connections: Auto stand

Construction
- Structure type: Elevated (on embankment)
- Parking: No
- Cycle facilities: No

Other information
- Status: Functioning
- Station code: DGBH
- Zone(s): East Central Railway
- Division(s): Danapur
- Fare zone: East Central Railway

History
- Opened: 25 November 2017

Services
Preceding station	Indian Railways	Following station
East Central Railway zone
Patliputra Junction towards Patna Junction or Danapur	Patna–Sonepur–Hajipur section	Bharpura Pahleza Ghat Junction across Ganga Rail–Road Bridge towards Sonpur Junction or Hajipur Junction
Route map
Location
- Location within Patna Location within India Location within Bihar

Digha Bridge Halt (station code: DGBH) is a small railway station in Patna district, of the Indian state of Bihar. This halt was constructed 3 km north from Patliputra Junction, near Danapur Bankipur road. It saves time for rail passengers going to Gandhi Maidan at least 1 hour. The distance between the Digha–Sonpur Bridge and this halt is around 2 km. Due to this small but functional railway station many students, government employees and elderly people including patients, get easy access to basic transportation to Patna. AIIMS-Digha Elevated Corridor (Patli Path) is parallel to this halt.

== Overview ==
Digha Bridge Halt was inaugurated on 25 November 2017. This 400-m halt was constructed at a cost of Rs 2.5 crore, and is equipped with basic facilities, including urinal and shades. On the first day, the Barauni–Patliputra Passenger (55230) was flagged off. Digha Bridge Halt is the only halt before the Digha–Sonpur rail-cum-road bridge.

== Trains ==
Digha Bridge Halt falls under the jurisdiction of Danapur railway division. A total of six pairs of passenger trains stop at Digha Bridge Halt:

Train Nº	Name
13235 / 13236	Patliputra–Gorakhpur Passenger
63265 / 63266	Ram Dayalu Nagar–Patliputra MEMU
63267 / 63268	Muzaffarpur–Patliputra MEMU
63280 / 63283	Patna–Barauni MEMU
63284 / 63285	Patna–Barauni MEMU
63287 / 63288	Patliputra–Barauni MEMU

== Nearest railway stations ==
The distance from nearby stations are:

S.No	Station	distance (in km)
1	Bharpura Pahlejaghat	5
2	Sonpur	9
3	Nayagaon	15
4	Patliputra	5
