= Lokmanya Tilak Terminus–Saharsa Amrit Bharat Express =

Amrit Bharat Express train route in India

Mumbai LTT - Saharsa Amrit Bharat Express
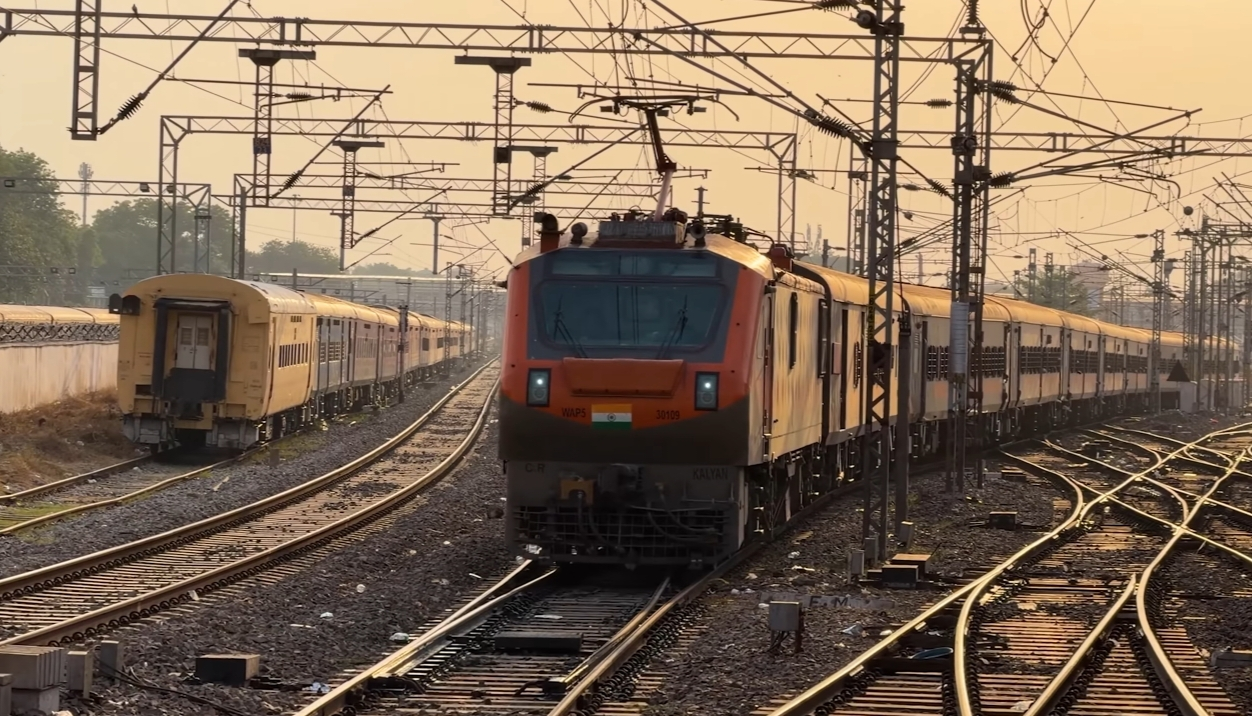
- SHC-LTT Amrit Bharat Express At Prayagraj Junction

Overview
- Service type: Amrit Bharat Express, Superfast Express
- Locale: Maharashtra, Madhya Pradesh, Uttar Pradesh & Bihar
- First service: 24 April 2025 (Inaugural); May 2025; 13 months ago (Commercial) (TBC)
- Current operator: Central Railways (CR)

Route
- Termini: Mumbai LTT (LTT); Saharsa Junction (SHC)
- Stops: 23
- Distance travelled: 1,950 km (1,212 mi)
- Average journey time: 32h 15m
- Service frequency: Weekly services (Note: 11015 - Fridays | 11016 - Sundays)
- Train number: 11015/11016
- Lines used: Lokmanya Tilak Terminus–Kalyan–Bhusaval line; Bhusaval–Jabalpur line; Jabalpur–Prayagraj Chheoki line; Pt. Deen Dayal Upadhyaya–Ara line; Danapur–Hajipur line; Muzaffarpur–Samastipur line; Samastipur–Khagaria line; Khagria–Saharsa line

On-board services
- Class: Sleeper Class Coach (SL) General Unreserved Coach (GS)
- Seating arrangements: Yes
- Sleeping arrangements: Yes
- Observation facilities: Saffron-Grey livery
- Entertainment facilities: Electric Outlets; Reading lights; Bottle Holder
- Baggage facilities: No
- Other facilities: CCTV cameras; Bio-Vacuum Toilets; Foot-Operated Water Taps; Passenger information system

Technical
- Rolling stock: Modified LHB Coaches
- Track gauge: Indian gauge 1,676 mm (5 ft 6 in) broad gauge
- Electrification: 25 kV 50 Hz AC Overhead line
- Operating speed: 55 km/h (34 mph) (Avg.)
- Average length: 23.54 m (77.2 ft) (each) and 22 coaches
- Track owner: Indian Railways
- Rake maintenance: Mumbai LTT (LTT)

The 11015 / 11016 Mumbai LTT - Saharsa Amrit Bharat Express is India's 3rd Non-AC Superfast Amrit Bharat Express train, which runs across the states of Maharashtra, Madhya Pradesh, Uttar Pradesh and Bihar by connecting the Gateway of India and capital city of Maharashtra Mumbai, with the municipal corporative city Saharsa in the eastern part of Bihar, India.

This express train was inaugurated on 24 April 2025 by Prime Minister Narendra Modi via virtual conferencing from Madhubani, a municipal city in the eastern state of Bihar, India.

== Overview ==
This train is currently operated by Indian Railways, connecting Mumbai LTT and Saharsa Jn. It is currently operated with train numbers 11015/11016 on Weekly services.

== Rakes ==
It is the first Amrit Bharat 2.0 Express train in which the locomotives were designed by Chittaranjan Locomotive Works (CLW) at Chittaranjan, West Bengal and the coaches were designed and manufactured by the Integral Coach Factory at Perambur, Chennai under the Make in India Initiative.

== Service ==
The 11015/11016 Mumbai LTT - Saharsa Amrit Bharat Express currently operates Weekly, covering a distance of 1,950 km (1,212 mi) in a travel time of 32hrs 15mins with average speed of 54 km/h. The Maximum Permissible Speed (MPS) for this train service is 130 km/h (81 mph).

== Train halts ==
Route of 11015/11016 Mumbai LTT ↔ Saharsa Amrit Bharat Express
11015 Mumbai LTT → Saharsa	11016 Saharsa → Mumbai LTT
Lokmanya Tilak Terminus	Saharsa Junction
Thane	Khagaria Junction
Kalyan Junction	Salauna
Nasik Road	Hasanpur Road
Jalgaon Junction	Samastipur Junction
Bhusaval Junction	Muzaffarpur Junction
Itarsi Junction	Hajipur Junction
Jabalpur	Sonpur Junction
Satna	Patliputra
Manikpur	Danapur
Prayagraj Cheoki	Ara Junction
Mirzapur	Buxar
Pandit Deen Dayal Upadhyaya Junction	Pandit Deen Dayal Upadhyaya Junction
Buxar	Mirzapur
Ara Junction	Prayagraj Cheoki
Danapur	Manikpur
Patliputra	Satna
Sonpur Junction	Jabalpur
Hajipur Junction	Itarsi Junction
Muzaffarpur Junction	Bhusaval Junction
Samastipur Junction	Jalgaon Junction
Hasanpur Road	Nasik Road
Salauna	Kalyan Junction
Khagaria Junction	Thane
Saharsa Junction	Lokmanya Tilak Terminus

== See also ==
- Amrit Bharat Express
- Vande Bharat Express
- Tejas Express
- Gatimaan Express
- Lokmanya Tilak Terminus
- Saharsa Junction railway station
