= Gorakhpur–Patliputra Vande Bharat Express =

Mini Vande Bharat Express train in India

Gorakhpur Junction – Patliputra Junction Vande Bharat Express
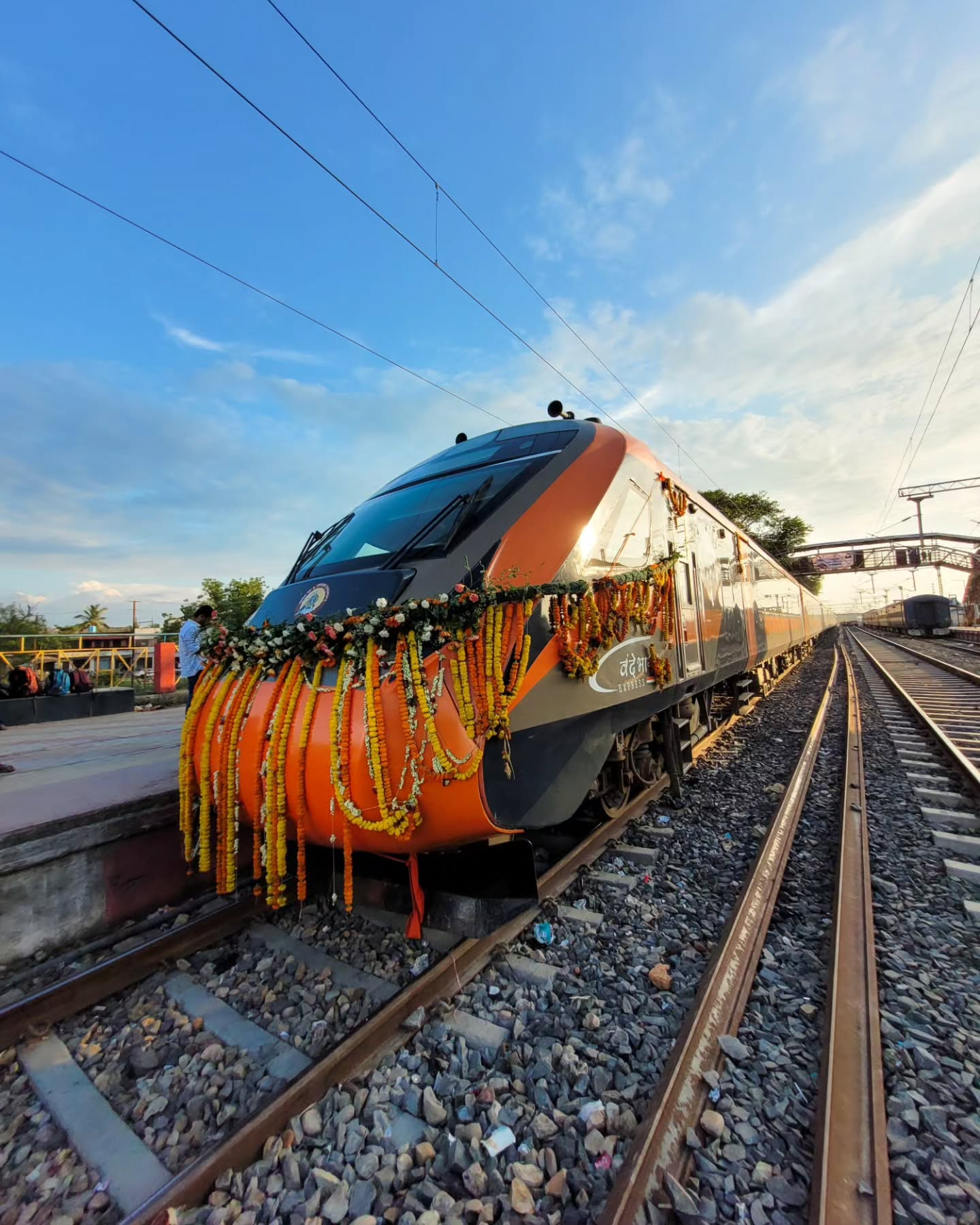
- Gorakhpur–Patliputra Vande Bharat Express

Overview
- Service type: Vande Bharat Express
- Status: Ready for operations
- Locale: Uttar Pradesh and Bihar
- First service: 20 June 2025 (Inaugural); 22 June 2025; 14 months ago (Commercial)
- Current operator: North Eastern Railways (NER)

Route
- Termini: Gorakhpur Junction (GKP); Patliputra Junction (PPTA)
- Stops: 10
- Distance travelled: 384 km (239 mi)
- Average journey time: 07 hrs 05 mins
- Service frequency: Six days a week
- Train number: 26502 / 26501
- Line used: Muzaffarpur–Gorakhpur main line – Muzaffarpur–Hajipur section – Patna–Sonepur–Hajipur section

On-board services
- Classes: AC Chair Car, AC Executive Chair Car
- Seating arrangements: Airline style; Rotatable seats
- Sleeping arrangements: No
- Catering facilities: On-board catering
- Observation facilities: Large windows in all coaches
- Entertainment facilities: On-board WiFi; Infotainment system; Electric outlets; Reading light; Seat pockets; Bottle holder; Tray table
- Baggage facilities: Overhead racks
- Other facilities: Kavach

Technical
- Rolling stock: Mini Vande Bharat 2.0
- Track gauge: Indian gauge
- Electrification: 25 kV 50 Hz AC overhead line
- Operating speed: 54 km/h (34 mph) (Avg.)
- Average length: 192 metres (630 ft) (08 coaches)
- Track owner: Indian Railways
- Rake maintenance: Gorakhpur Jn (GKP)

The 26502/26501 Gorakhpur–Patliputra Vande Bharat Express via Muzaffarpur is India's 70th Vande Bharat Express train, connecting the Gorakhnath Math temple city, Gorakhpur with the metropolitan and capital city, Patna in Bihar.

This train was inaugurated on 20 June 2025, by Prime Minister Narendra Modi via video-conferencing from Siwan.

== Schedule ==
26501 / 26502 Patliputra–Gorakhpur Vande Bharat Express schedule
| Train type | Vande Bharat Express |
| Distance | ~384 km |
| Average speed | ~54 km/h |
| Journey time (Patliputra → Gorakhpur Junction) | 7 hrs 00 min |
| Journey time (Gorakhpur Junction → Patliputra) | 7 hrs 05 min |
| Number of stops | 10 |
| Classes available | Chair Car (CC), Executive Chair Car (EC) |
| Operating days (26501) | Monday, Tuesday, Wednesday, Thursday, Friday, Sunday (No service on Saturday) |
| Operating days (26502) | Monday, Tuesday, Wednesday, Thursday, Friday, Sunday (No service on Saturday) |
| Train numbers | 26501 (PPTA → GKP) / 26502 (GKP → PPTA) |
| Terminal stations | Patliputra – Gorakhpur Junction |
| Operator | North Eastern Railway (NER) |

== Route and halts ==
Patliputra–Gorakhpur–Patliputra Vande Bharat Express time table
| 26501 PPTA–GKP | | | | 26502 GKP–PPTA | | | |
| Station | Day | Arr. | Dep. | Station | Day | Arr. | Dep. |
|---|---|---|---|---|---|---|---|
| Patliputra | 1 | — | 15:30 | Gorakhpur Junction | 1 | — | 05:40 |
| Hajipur Junction | 1 | 16:08 | 16:10 | Kaptanganj Junction | 1 | 06:24 | 06:26 |
| Muzaffarpur Junction (Loco reversal) | 1 | 17:00 | 17:05 | Bagaha | 1 | 07:30 | 07:32 |
| Bapudham Motihari | 1 | 18:23 | 18:25 | Narkatiaganj Junction | 1 | 08:03 | 08:05 |
| Sagauli Junction | 1 | 18:43 | 18:45 | Bettiah | 1 | 08:35 | 08:37 |
| Bettiah | 1 | 19:00 | 19:02 | Sagauli Junction | 1 | 08:50 | 08:52 |
| Narkatiaganj Junction | 1 | 19:33 | 19:35 | Bapudham Motihari | 1 | 09:08 | 09:10 |
| Bagaha | 1 | 20:02 | 20:04 | Muzaffarpur Junction (Loco reversal) | 1 | 10:50 | 10:55 |
| Kaptanganj Junction | 1 | 21:38 | 21:40 | Hajipur Junction | 1 | 11:40 | 11:42 |
| Gorakhpur Junction | 1 | 22:30 | — | Patliputra | 1 | 12:45 | — |

Other Details
| Location | Description |
|---|---|
| Gorakhpur Junction | Primary maintenance |
| Muzaffarpur Junction | Watering point & reversal point |

== Performance and earnings ==
According to data obtained from East Central Railway under the RTI Act, Train no. 26501 Patliputra–Gorakhpur Vande Bharat Express performed well between 22 June 2025 and 16 March 2026. During this period, the train recorded an average occupancy of 89%, with a total of 1,06,053 passengers.

The train earned around ₹7,23,36,408 in total revenue during this time.

The station-wise earnings are given below:

| Station code | Station Name | Earnings (₹) |
|---|---|---|
| PPTA | Patliputra | 5,34,62,589 |
| HJP | Hajipur | 46,84,819 |
| MFP | Muzaffarpur | 68,38,561 |
| BMKI | Bapudham Motihari | 23,01,564 |
| SGL | Sagauli | 8,79,682 |
| BTH | Bettiah | 23,53,831 |
| NKE | Narkatiaganj | 12,03,422 |
| BUG | Bagaha | 5,99,000 |
| CPJ | Captainganj | 12,940 |
| GKP | Gorakhpur | 0 |

== See also ==
- Vande Bharat Express
- Tejas Express
- Gatiman Express
- Muzaffarpur Junction
- Gorakhpur Junction railway station
- Patliputra Junction railway station
