= Patliputra–Raxaul Intercity Express =

Express train in Bihar, India

Intercity Express
Overview
- Service type: Express
- Current operator: East Central Railway zone

Route
- Termini: Patliputra Junction; Raxaul Junction
- Stops: 15
- Distance travelled: 205 km (127 mi)
- Average journey time: 11 hours 55 mins
- Service frequency: six days in a week
- Train number: 15201 / 15202

On-board services
- Class: general unreserved
- Seating arrangements: Yes
- Sleeping arrangements: Yes
- Catering facilities: No

Technical
- Rolling stock: Standard Indian Railways Coaches
- Track gauge: 1,676 mm (5 ft 6 in)
- Operating speed: 32.5 km/h (20 mph)
Route map
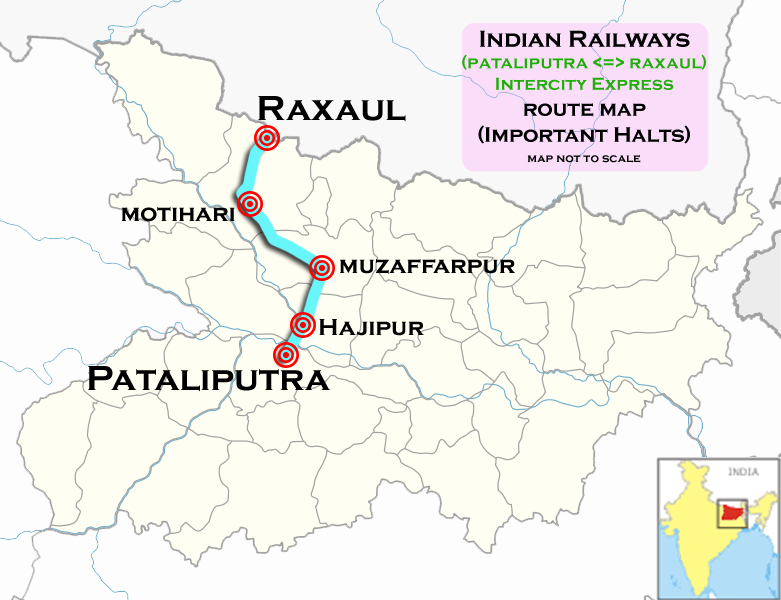

The 15201 / 02 Intercity Express is an Express train belonging to Indian Railways East Central Railway zone that runs between Patliputra Junction and Raxaul Junction in India.

It operates as train number 15201 from Patliputra Junction to Raxaul Junction and as train number 15202 in the reverse direction serving the states of Bihar.

== Coaches ==
The 15201 / 02 Intercity Express has 12 general unreserved & four SLR (seating with luggage rake) coaches . It does not carry a pantry car coach.

As is customary with most train services in India, coach composition may be amended at the discretion of Indian Railways depending on demand.

== Service ==
The 15201 Patliputra Junction - Raxaul Junction Intercity Express covers the distance of 235 km (146 mi) in 7 hours 05 mins (29 km/h) and in 5 hours 40 mins as the 15202 Raxaul Junction - Patliputra Junction Intercity Express (36 km/h).

As the average speed of the train is lower than 55 km/h (34 mph), as per railway rules, its fare doesn't includes a Superfast surcharge.

== Routing ==
The 15201 / 02 Intercity Express runs from Patliputra Junction via Sonpur Junction, Muzaffarpur Junction, Mehsi railway station, Sagauli Junction to Raxaul Junction.

== Traction ==
As the route is going to electrification, a Samastipur Junction based WDM-3A diesel locomotive pulls the train to its destination.
