= Patliputra–Lucknow Intercity Express =

Patliputra - Lucknow Intercity Express
Overview
- Service type: Express
- First service: 14 March 2016; 9 years ago
- Current operator: East Central Railway zone

Route
- Termini: Patliputra Junction (PPTA); Lucknow Junction (LJN)
- Stops: 8
- Distance travelled: 521 km (324 mi)
- Average journey time: 10h 45m
- Service frequency: Monday, Tuesday, Wednesday, Friday, Saturday
- Train number: 12529/12530

On-board services
- Classes: AC Chair Car, AC 3 tier, Second Sitting, General Unreserved
- Seating arrangements: Yes
- Sleeping arrangements: No
- Auto-rack arrangements: Yes
- Catering facilities: On-board Catering; E-Catering
- Observation facilities: LHB Coaches
- Entertainment facilities: No
- Baggage facilities: Yes
- Other facilities: Below the seats

Technical
- Rolling stock: 2
- Track gauge: Broad Gauge 1,676 mm (5 ft 6 in)
- Electrification: Yes
- Operating speed: Operating speed 115-120 km/h

The Patliputra - Lucknow Intercity Express is an Express train belonging to East Central Railway zone that runs between Lucknow Junction and Patliputra Junction in India. It is currently being operated with 12529/12530 train numbers on twice in a week basis.

== Service ==
The 12529/Patliputra - Lucknow Jn SF InterCity Express has an average speed of 48 km/h and covers 521 km in 10h 45m. The 12530/Lucknow Jn. - Patliputra SF InterCity Express has an average speed of 53 km/h and covers 521 km in 9h 50m.

== Route and halts ==
The important halts of the train are:

- Patliputra Junction
- Dighwara
- Chhapra Junction
- Siwan Junction
- Deoria Sadar
- Gorakhpur Junction
- Basti
- Gonda Junction
- Badshahnagar
- Lucknow Junction

== Coach composite ==
The train has standard ICF rakes with max speed of 110 kmph. The train consists of 14 coaches :

- 1 AC Chair Car
- 1 AC III Chair Car
- 6 Second Sitting
- 4 General
- 2 Seating cum Luggage Rake

== Traction ==
Both trains are hauled by a Ghaziabad based WAP 7 or WAP 5 Electric Locomotive from Patliputra to Lucknow and vice versa.

== See also ==
- Patliputra Junction railway station
- Lucknow Junction railway station
- Patliputra - Chandigarh Superfast Express

== Schedule ==
Train Number	Station Code	Departure Station	Departure Time	Departure Days	Arrival Station	Arrival Time	Arrival Days
12529	PPTA	Patliputra (PATNA)	3:50 PM	Monday, Tuesday, Wednesday, Friday, Saturday	Lucknow	2:35 AM	Tuesday, Thursday, Saturday, Sunday
12530	LJN	Lucknow	5:00 AM	Monday, Tuesday, Wednesday, Friday, Saturday	Patliputra (PATNA)	2:50 PM	Monday, Tuesday, Wednesday, Friday, Saturday (Same Day)
