= Bharpura Pahleza Ghat Junction railway station =

Railway station in Saran, Bihar, India

BHARPURA PAHLEZA GHAT JUNCTION

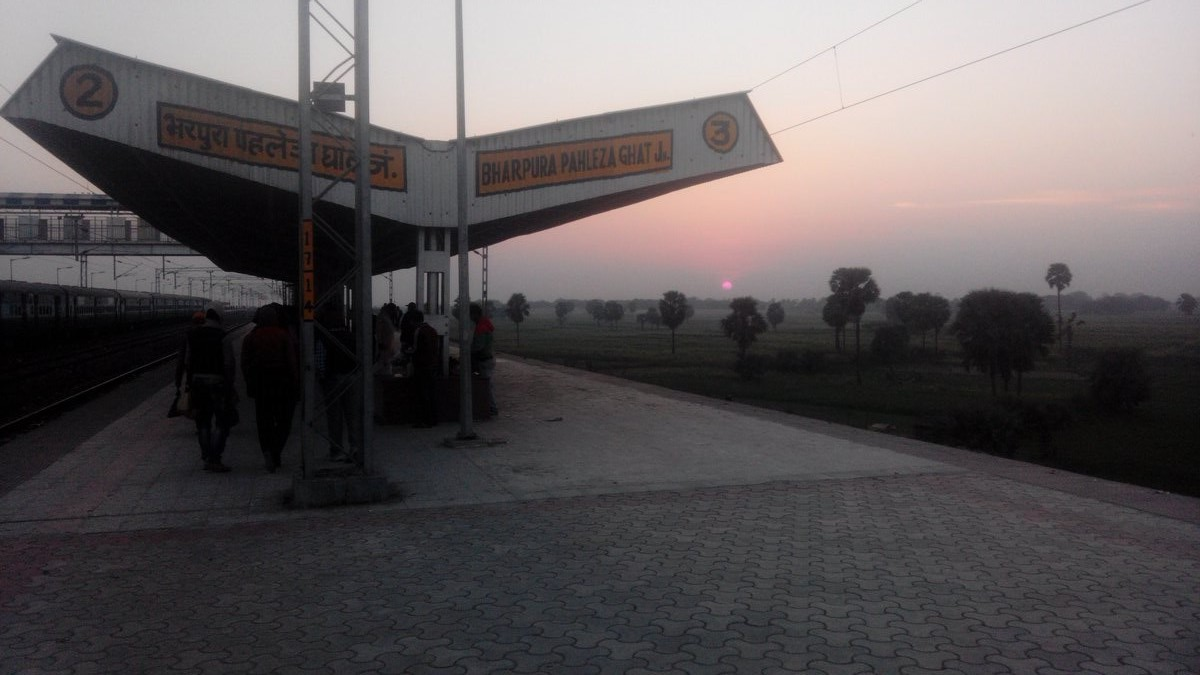

General information
- Location: Sonpur, Saran, Bihar-841101; India
- Coordinates: 25°41′49″N 85°10′2″E
- Elevation: 56 metres (184 ft)
- System: Indian Railways station
- Owner: East Central Railway of the Indian Railways
- Operator: Indian Railways
- Lines: Barauni–Gorakhpur, Raxaul and Jainagar lines; Muzaffarpur–Gorakhpur line (via Hajipur, Raxaul and Sitamarhi); Barauni–Samastipur–Muzaffarpur–Hajipur line; Parmanandpur–Chhapra–Siwan–Gorakhpur/Chhapra–Balia–Varanasi line
- Platforms: 3
- Tracks: 4
- Connections: Hajipur

Construction
- Structure type: Standard (on ground station)
- Parking: Available

Other information
- Status: Functioning
- Station code: PHLG
- Zone(s): East Central Railway
- Division(s): Sonpur

History
- Opened: 3 February 2016; 10 years ago
- Electrified: 2016; 10 years ago
Route map
Location
- Location within Bihar Location within India
- Interactive map

Bharpura Pahlejaghat Junction, station code PHLG, is a railway station in Sonpur division of East Central Railway. Bharpura Pahlejaghat Junction is located in Sonpur city in Saran district in the Indian state of Bihar. It is located on the north end of Digha–Sonpur rail–road bridge, while Patliputra is on the south end of the bridge. Pahleja Station is 3.81 km from Sonpur and 11.46 km from Patliputra. It is connected to Sonpur on its east side and Parmanandpur station on its west side. In June 2017, a 20 kW roof top hybrid solar plant with 20% storage facility installed and commissioned at Pahaleja Ghat railway station.

== History ==
Old Pahleja ghat station was operational till 1982. Prior to Mahatma Gandhi Setu opening in 1982, there was regular Steamer service of the Indian Railways between Mahendru Ghat in Patna end and Pahleja Ghat in Sonpur. There was old metre-gauge line between Pahleja station and Sonepur station. The station was not in use and was left abandoned after opening of Mahatma Gandhi Setu. The new station was built around 3.2 km east from the old station and started on 3 February 2016. The station was earlier named Pahlejaghat Junction, but after protest from the villagers of Bharpura, it was renamed to Bharpura Pahlejaghat Junction in July 2016. In the 2016 Floods in Bihar, this station worked as relief center for flood victims.

== Distance from other stations ==
The distance from nearby stations are:

S.No	Station	distance (in km)
1	Patliputra	11.46
2	Sonpur	3.81
3	Parmanandpur	5.11
4	Nayagaon	9
5	Hajipur	9
6	Digha Bridge Halt (DGBH)	5

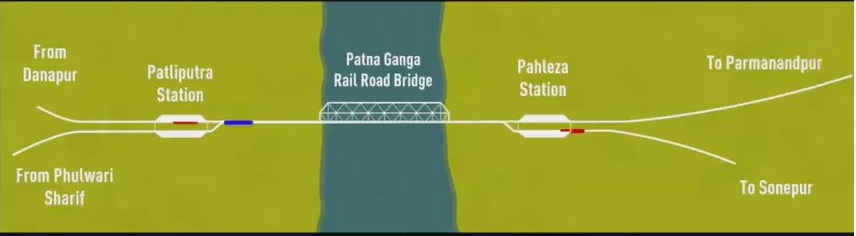
Patliputra and Bharpura Pahleja Ghat station on both sides of bridge

== Trains ==
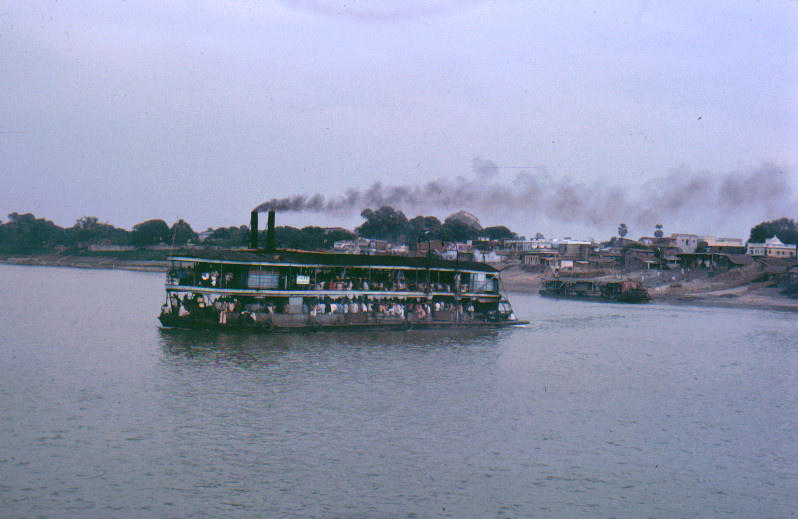
steamer service towards mahendru near Old pahleja ghat station in 1980s

- Gorakhpur–Patliputra Passenger (Train no. 55008)
- Patliputra Gorakhpur Passenger (Train no. 55007)
- Raxaul–Hajipur Intercity Express (Train no. 15202)
- Gorakhpur–Patliputra Passenger (Train no. 55042)
- Sonepur–Gorakhpur Passenger (Train no.55209)
- Patliputra–Barauni DEMU (Train no. 75216)
- Patliputra–Narkatiaganj Intercity (Train no. 25201)
