= Mithila Deep railway station =

Railway station in Madhubani, Bihar, India

General information
- Location: Madhubani district, Bihar; India
- Coordinates: 26.2367°N 86.3121°E
- Elevation: 57 metres (187 ft)
- System: Indian Railways station
- Owner: Indian Railways
- Operator: East Central Railway
- Line: Sakri–Nirmali metre-gauge line
- Platforms: 2
- Tracks: 4 (metre gauge)
- Connections: Auto stand

Construction
- Structure type: Standard (on-ground station)
- Parking: No
- Cycle facilities: No

Other information
- Status: Functioning
- Station code: MTLP
- Zone(s): East Central Railway
- Division(s): Samastipur
Location

Mithila Deep railway station (station code: MTLP), is a Broade-gauge railway station in Madhubani district, Bihar. The station consists of 2 platforms. The station lies on Sakri–Nirmali Broade-gauge line.
