= Hajipur–Chhapra section =

Railway line in India

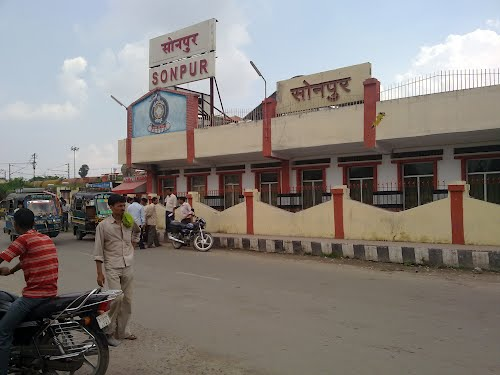
- Sonpur Junction is important railway station on this section

Overview
- Status: Operational
- Owner: Indian Railways
- Locale: Bihar
- Termini: Hajipur Junction; Chhapra Junction
- Stations: 15

Service
- Type: Passenger and freight train line
- Services: Barauni–Gorakhpur line
- Operator(s): Indian Railways, East Central Railway and North Central Railway
- Depot(s): Hajipur and Chhapra
- Rolling stock: Diesel locos: WDM-2, WDM-3A, WDS-5, WDP-4 and WDG-4

History
- Opened: 1886

Technical
- Line length: 65 km (40 mi)
- Track length: 59 km
- Number of tracks: (electrified Hajipur–Chhapra)
- Track gauge: 5 ft 6 in (1,676 mm) broad gauge
- Electrification: 25kV 50Hz AC OHLE (between 2011- December 2014): (started from 24 December 2014)
- Operating speed: up to 110 km/ h
- Highest elevation: 57 metres

The Hajipur–Chhapra section is a railway line connecting Hajipur Junction to Chhapra Junction via Sonpur, ndian state of Bihar. The 59 km (37 mi) line passes through the plains of North Bihar and the Gangetic Plain in Bihar. It is section on Barauni–Gorakhpur line.
