= Barauni–Gorakhpur line =

Railway line in India

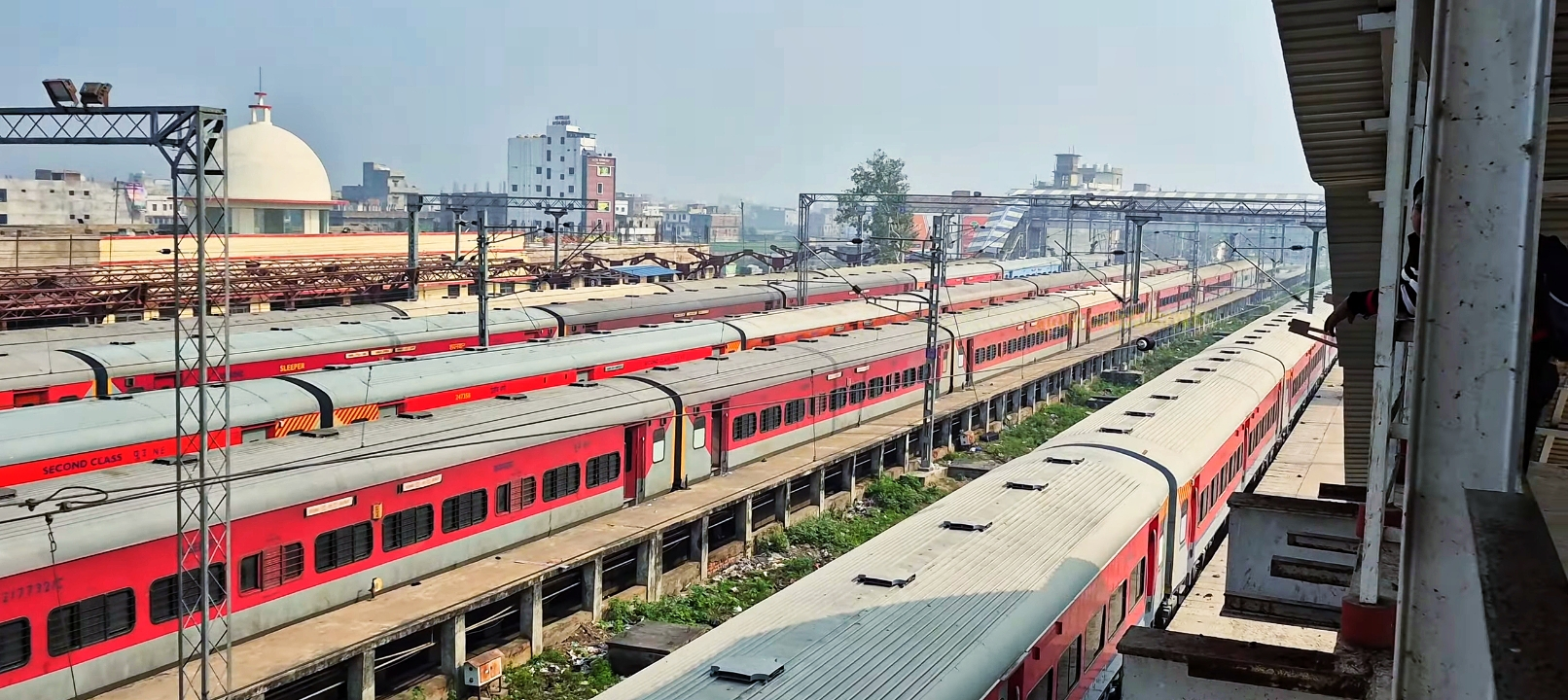
- Chhapra Junction is an important railway station on Barauni–Gorakhpur line

Overview
- Status: Operational
- Owner: Indian Railways
- Locale: Bihar and Uttar Pradesh
- Termini: Barauni; Gorakhpur

Service
- Operator(s): East Central Railway, North Eastern Railway

Technical
- Track gauge: 5 ft 6 in (1,676 mm) broad gauge
- Electrification: Yes
- Operating speed: 110 km/h (70 mph)

The Barauni–Gorakhpur line are connecting Barauni in the Indian state of Bihar with Gorakhpur in Uttar Pradesh. The lines run in an east–west direction between the Gandak. The lines connects via Samastipur, Muzaffarpur, Hajipur Junction, Sonpur Junction, Chhapra and Siwan Junction.

== History ==
Railway lines in the area were pioneered by Tirhut Railway and the Bengal and North Western Railway lines in the 19th century. In his book The Indian Empire, Its People, History and Products (first published in 1886) W.W.Hunter, says "The Tirhut State Railway with its various branches intersects Northern Behar and is intended to extend to the Nepal frontier on one side and to Assam on the other."

The area was developed with metre-gauge tracks. The 229 km (142 mi) Samastipur–Narkatiaganj loop was developed in stages between 1875 and 1907. The Samastipur–Darbhanga line was opened for famine relief in 1874 and opened to the public on 1 November 1875. The 72 km-long (45 mi) Nirmali branch (Darbhanga–Nirmali) between 1883 and 1886. The Barauni–Bachhwara line was opened in 1883. The Bachhwara–Bagaha line was developed in stages between 1883 and 1907. The Sakri–Jainagar branch was opened in 1905. The 51 km-long (32 mi) Hajipur–Muzaffarpur line was opened in 1884. The 270 km-long (170 mi) Tirhut main line from Katihar to Sonpur was developed in stages between 1887 and 1901. The 105 km-long (65 mi) Chhapra–Thawe line was opened in 1910. The 320 km-long (200 mi) Chhapra–Allahabad line was developed between 1891 and 1913. The Maharajganj branch line was opened in 1907. The Siwan–Kaptanganj line was opened between 1907 and 1913. The 127 km-long (79 mi) Bhatni–Varanasi Chord was opened between 1896 and 1899. The Jhanjharpur–Laukaha Bazar line was opened in 1976.

The lines were converted to 1,676 mm (5 ft 6 in) broad gauge in phases starting from early 1980s. Samastipur to Darbhanga (metre to broad gauge) was converted around 1983. Siwan to Thawe (metre to broad gauge) was converted in early 2006. Gauge conversion of the 268 km-long (167 mi) Jainagar–Darbhanga–Narkatiaganj line that was started in 2011 was completed to Raxaul in February 2014 and to Narkatiaganj in 2017. The Sakri–Laukaha Bazar–Nirmali conversion is under process.

== Sections ==
- Barauni–Samastipur section
- Samastipur–Muzaffarpur section
- Muzaffarpur–Hajipur section
- Hajipur–Chhapra Section

== New lines ==
New lines being constructed in the area include:

Line	Length
Sitamarhi–Jaynagar–Nirmali line (via Sursand)	188 km (117 mi)
Hajipur–Sagauli via Vaishali line	148.3 km (92.1 mi)
Chhapra–Muzaffarpur line	84.65 km (52.60 mi)
Sakri–Hasanpur line	79 km (49 mi)
Darbhanga-Kusheshwar Asthan line	70.14 km (43.58 mi)
Muzaffarpur–Darbhanga line	66.9 km (41.6 mi)
Muzaffarpur–Katra–Oral–Janakpur Road line	66.55 km (41.35 mi)
Muzaffarpur–Sitamarhi line	63 km (39 mi)
Chhapra–Hajipur line (existing line being doubled)	59 km (37 mi)

== Bridge links ==
The Ganges divides the state of Bihar in two parts. The construction of the 2 km-long (1 1/4 mi) Rajendra Setu in 1959 provided the first opportunity to link the railway tracks on the north and south banks of the Ganges.

The 4.55 km (2.83 mi)-long Ganga Rail-Road Bridge, opened from 3 February 2016, links Sonpur and Parmanandpur to Pahlezaghat Junction on north side of bridge to Patliputra Junction on south side of bridge to Patna.
