= Patliputra–Chandigarh Superfast Express =

Train in India

Patliputra - Chandigarh Superfast Express
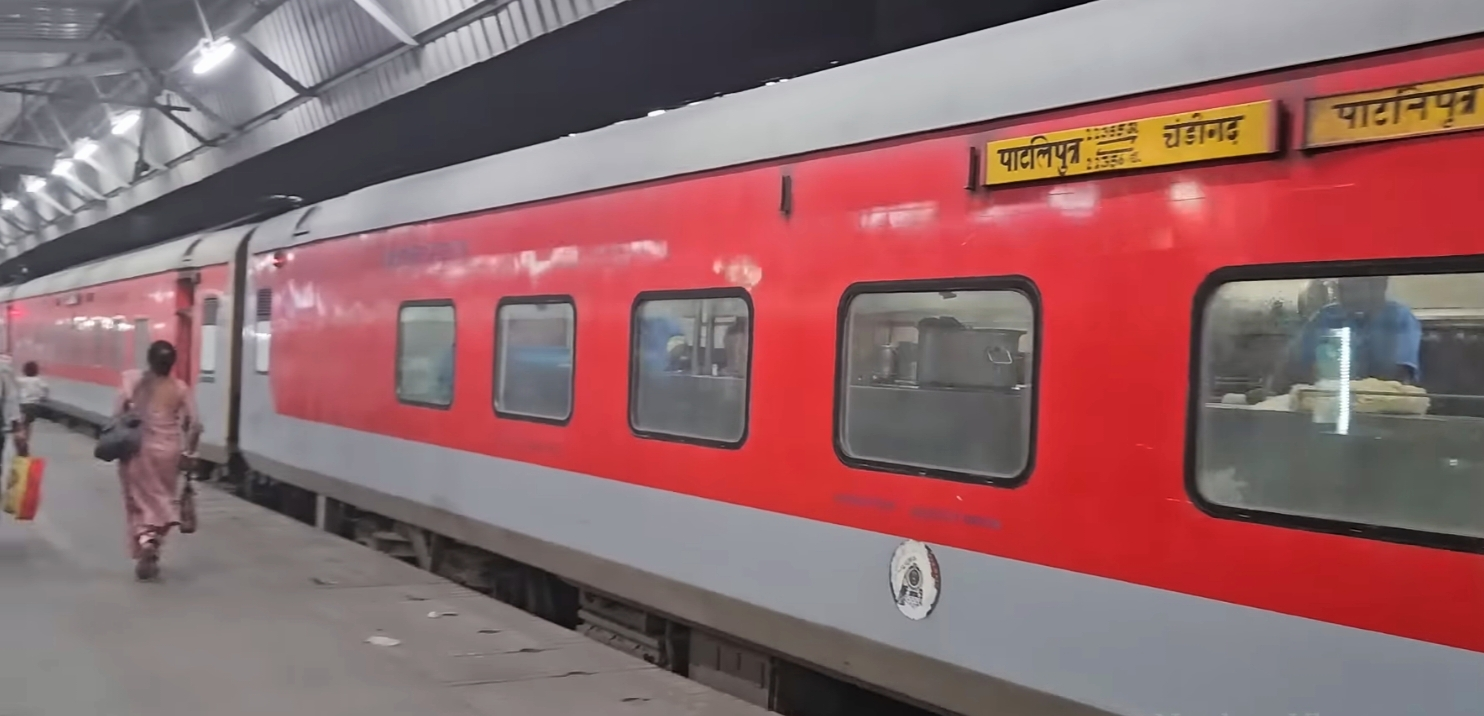
- Patliputra - Chandigarh Superfast Express At Ambala Cantt Junction

Overview
- Service type: Superfast Express
- Current operator: East Central Railway zone

Route
- Termini: Patliputra Junction (PPTA); Chandigarh Junction (CDG)
- Stops: 9
- Distance travelled: 1,153 km (716 mi)
- Average journey time: 21h
- Service frequency: Twice (Note: Runs two days in a week for every direction.)
- Train number: 22355/22356

On-board services
- Classes: AC 1 Tier, AC 2 tier, AC 3 tier, Sleeper Class, General Unreserved
- Seating arrangements: No
- Sleeping arrangements: Yes
- Catering facilities: On-board Catering; E-Catering
- Observation facilities: LHB coaches
- Entertainment facilities: No
- Baggage facilities: No
- Other facilities: Below the seats

Technical
- Rolling stock: 1
- Track gauge: 1,676 mm (5 ft 6 in)
- Operating speed: 55 km/h (34 mph), including halts

The Patliputra–Chandigarh Superfast Express is a Superfast Express train belonging to East Central Railway zone that runs between Chandigarh Junction and Patliputra Junction in India. It is currently being operated with 22355/22356 train numbers on a biweekly basis.

== Service ==
The 22355/Patliputra–Chandigarh Express has an average speed of 55 km/h (34 mph) and covers 1,153 km (716 mi) in 20 hours and 50 minutes. The 22356/Chandigarh–Patliputra Express covers the same distance at an average speed of 55 km/h (34 mph) but in 21 hours.

== Route and halts ==
It commences its journey from the Patliputra Junction railway station and travels through the Indian states of Bihar, Uttar Pradesh, Uttrakhand, Haryana and Punjab to reach Chandigarh.

The important halts of the train are:

- Patliputra Junction
- Danapur
- Ara Junction
- Buxar
- Mughalsarai Junction
- Varanasi Junction
- Jaunpur City
- Sultanpur Junction
- Lucknow Charbagh
- Hardoi
- Bareilly Junction
- Moradabad Junction
- Roorkee
- Saharanpur Junction
- Ambala Cantonment Junction
- Chandigarh Junction

== Coach composite ==
The train has standard LHB rakes with max speed of 130 kmph. The train consists of 22 coaches :

- 1 AC I Tier Coach
- 2 AC II Tier Coaches
- 6 AC III Tier Coaches
- 6 Sleeper Coaches
- 1 Pantry Car Coach
- 5 General Coaches
- 1 Luggage Brake and Generator Car

== Traction ==
Both trains are hauled by a Mughal Sarai Loco Shed based WAP-4 electric locomotive from Patna to Chandigarh and vice versa.

== News ==
The train was selected under the 2nd phase of project Utkrisht by East Central Railway to boost the comfort level for the passengers. But now LHBfied for extreme comfort for the passengers.

== See also ==
- Chandigarh Junction railway station
- Patliputra Junction railway station
- Akal Takht Express
- Gurumukhi Superfast Express
- Dibrugarh-Chandigarh Express
- Saharsa - Amritsar Jan Sadharan Express (via Chandigarh)
