= Sonpur Junction railway station =

Railway station in Saran, Bihar, India

SONPUR JUNCTION

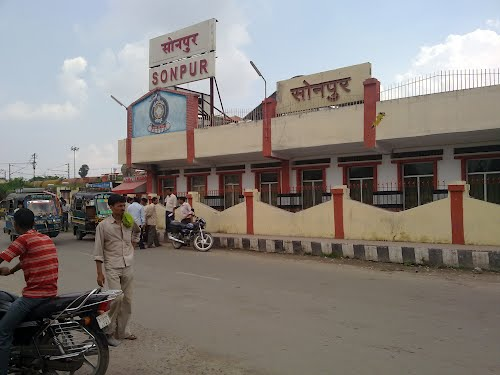
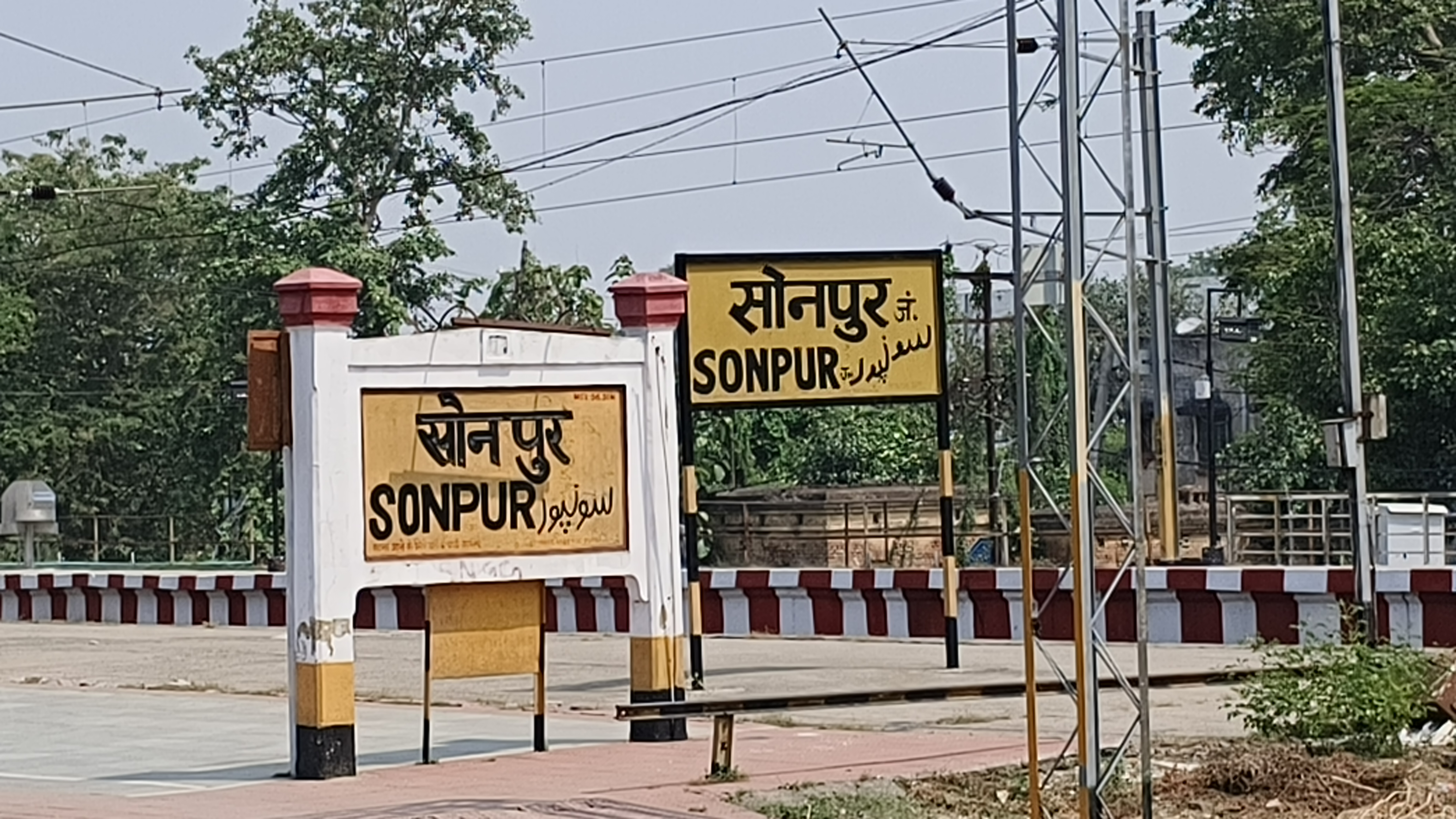
- Outside view of Sonpur Junction railway station Sonpur Junction railway station nameboard

General information
- Location: Sonpur, Saran district, Bihar; India
- Coordinates: 25°41′49″N 85°10′2″E
- Elevation: 56 metres (184 ft)
- System: Express train and Passenger train station
- Owner: Indian Railways
- Operator: Indian Railways
- Line: Barauni–Gorakhpur line
- Platforms: 5
- Tracks: 8

Construction
- Structure type: Standard (on ground station)
- Parking: Available

Other information
- Status: Functioning
- Station code: SEE
- Zone(s): East Central Railway zone
- Division(s): Sonpur

History
- Former names: East Indian Railway

Passengers
- 50,000 per day
Route map
Location
- Location within Bihar Location within India
- Interactive map

Sonpur Junction, station code SEE, is a railway station and the headquarters of the Sonpur railway division of East Central Railway. Sonpur Junction is located in Sonpur city in Saran district in the Indian state of Bihar.

== History ==
In 2011, the Sonpur Junction was given a facelift with a wider approach roads and greenery in and around the station premises at the cost of ₹20 million (US$210,000). The work on doubling of tracks on 7 kilometres (4.3 mi) tracks between Sonpur and Hajipur has been carried on since past few years and is set to be completed by the end of 2012.

=== Redevelopment ===
Sonpur Junction is to be redeveloped under the Indian Railroads’ Amrit Bharat Station Scheme. In a written reply to Lok Sabha on 4 February 2026, the Ministry of Railroads stated that the work on circulating area of the station,elevation of existing station building, construction of a new atrium building with concourse and booking counter and development of main entrance porch had been completed. Renovation of the existing booking counter is also completed. Construction of a new 12 metre wide foot overbridge was undergoing.In January 2026, The Times of India reported that the redevelopment project was being undertaken at a cost of over ₹24 crore. Works included improvements to passenger amenities, station facade and foot overbridge. The later development plans also included a second station entrance, and refurbishment of platforms 3, 4 and 5.

=== Bridge ===
In 2009, the construction of India's longest road-cum-rail bridge, the Digha–Sonpur rail–road bridge, was underway on the banks on the Ganges nearby, to connect Patna to Pahleja Ghat. The bridge was completed by end of August 2015. It is 4.55 kilometres (2.83 miles) long and therefore the longest road cum rail bridge in India and one of the longest in the world.

== Infrastructure ==
There are 4 platforms at Sonpur Junction. The platforms are interconnected with foot overbridges (FOB). The length of the platforms were increased in 2011 to accommodate 24-coach trains. The major facilities available are Waiting rooms, computerised reservation facility, Vehicle parking. The vehicles are allowed to enter the station premises. The station also has STD/ISD/PCO Telephone booth, toilets, tea stall and book stall. The passenger reservation system, booking counters and unreserved ticketing system are provided with air-conditioning facility.

In October 2016, Railways inaugurated a Happiness Junction at the Sonepur railway station, with an objective to provide books and several other entertainment tools to passengers waiting for trains.

== Gallery ==
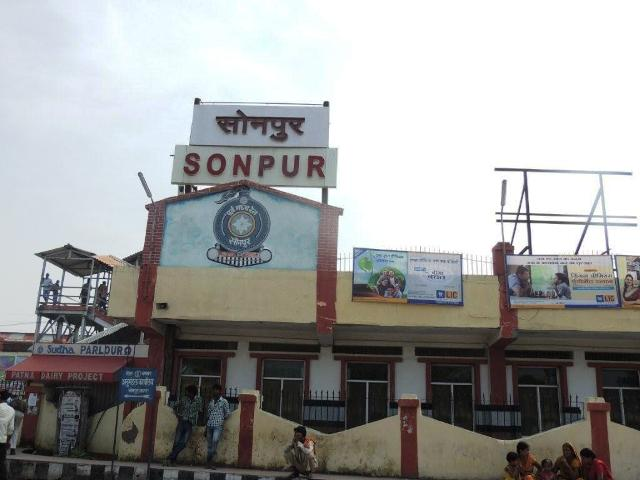
Sonpur jn 1

== Nearest railway stations ==
The distance from nearby stations are:

S.No	Station	distance (in km)
1	Patliputra	14
2	Bharpura Pahlejaghat	3.81
3	Parmanandpur	7
4	Nayagaon	11
5	Hajipur	5
6	Digha Bridge Halt (DGBH)	9

== Nearest airports ==
The nearest airports to Sonpur Junction are:

- Lok Nayak Jayaprakash Airport, Patna 15 kilometres (9.3 mi)
- Gaya Airport 121 kilometres (75 mi)
- Netaji Subhash Chandra Bose International Airport, Kolkata

== See also ==
- Lichchavi Express
