= Patli Path =

AIIMS-Digha elevated corridor road

Digha AIIMS Elevated Road Patli Path
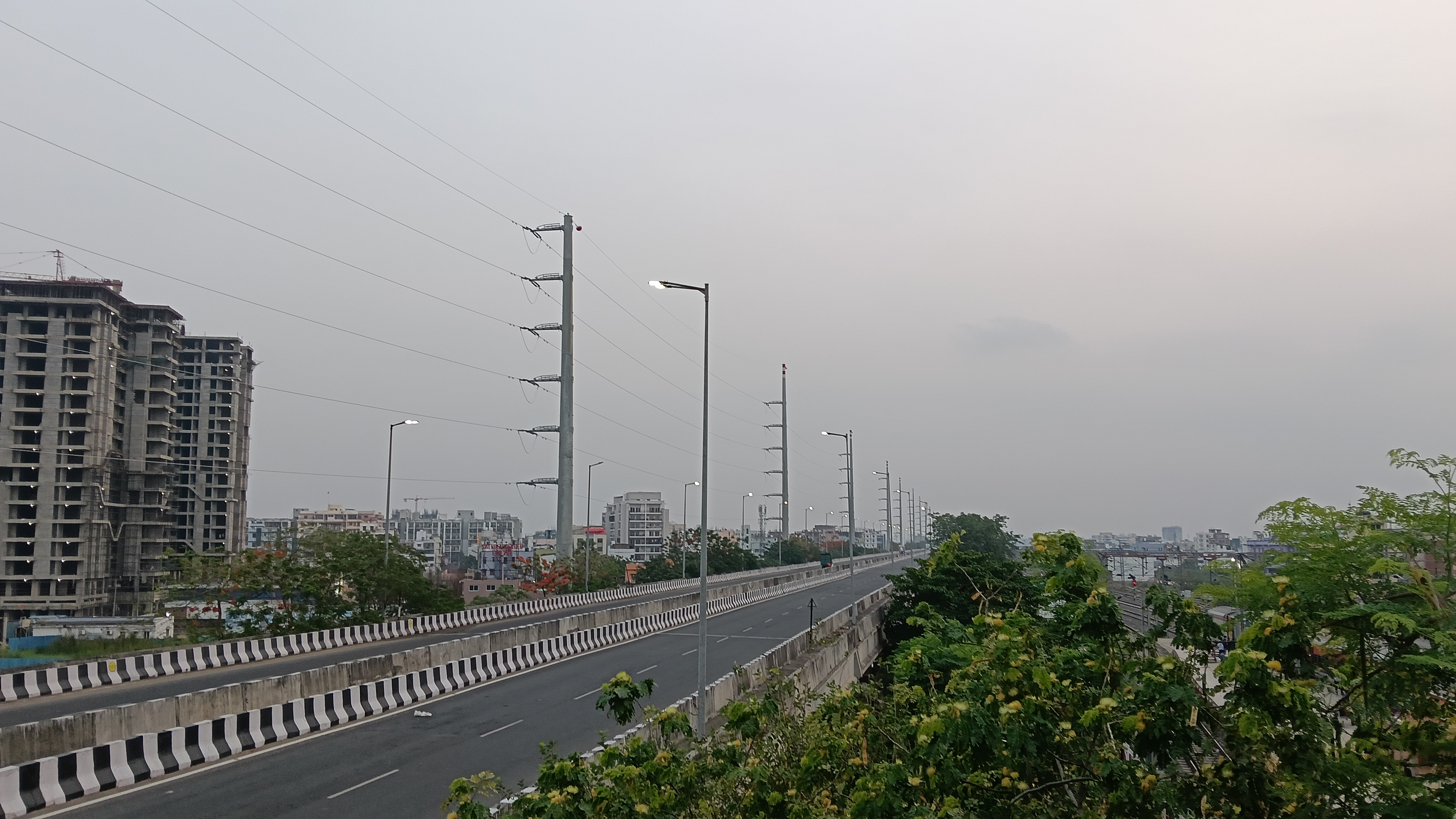
- View of the Digha-AIIMS Elevated Road from Patliputra Junction

Route information
- Maintained by Government of Bihar
- Length: 12.47 km (7.75 mi)

Major junctions
- North end: Digha, Patna
- South end: All India Institute of Medical Sciences, Patna, Phulwari Sharif

Location
- Country: India
- Major cities: Patna, Bihar

Highway system
- Roads in India; Expressways; National; State; Asian

Patli Path (also known as AIIMS-Digha elevated corridor) is an elevated road in Patna, the capital of Bihar. It was inaugurated by Chief Minister Nitish Kumar on 30 November 2020. At the time of inauguration of this elevated road, it was the longest elevated road of Bihar and seventh in India.

This 12.47 km-long elevated road connects J.P. Setu towards Phulwari Sharif and vice versa. Around 8.5 km of the road is elevated structure and the remaining 4 km stretch of road is semi-elevated. The first 2 km of the road from NH-98 near All India Institute of Medical Sciences, Patna is a two-lane semi-elevated structure. The Digha AIIMS Elevated Road road runs parallel to two-lane Digha Bridge Link Road, and it is built above Rupaspur canal (Digha- Danapur canal). As part of this project, there was construction of a railway overbridge (ROB) at Khagaul.

== History ==
The foundation stone of AIIMS-Digha elevated corridor was laid on November 2, 2013, by Chief Minister Nitish Kumar. It is constructed at the cost of Rs 1,289.25 crore. The project is being executed by Gammon India Pvt Ltd. In September 2013, Bihar State Road Development Corporation Limited (BSRDCL) awarded this project to Gammon India Pvt Ltd, which quoted the lowest bid of Rs Rs 717.14 crore.

== See also ==
- JP Ganga Path (Patna Marine Drive)
- Ashok Rajpath
- Atal Path
