= Patliputra Junction railway station =

Railway station in Patna, Bihar, India

PATLIPUTRA JUNCTION

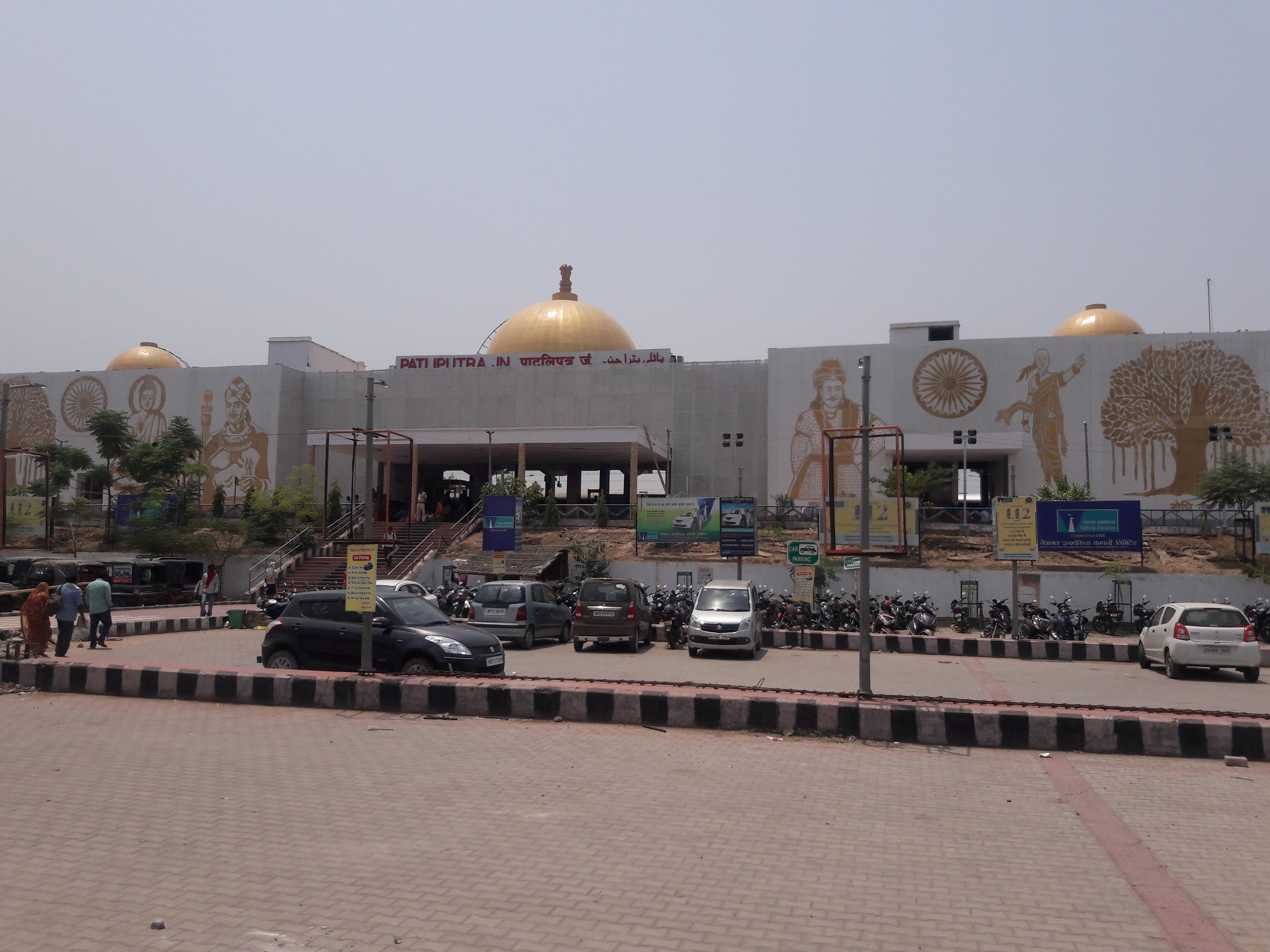
- Outside view of Patliputra Junction railway station

General information
- Location: Jagat Vihar Colony, Rukanpura, Patna, Bihar – 800025; India
- Coordinates: 25°37′14″N 85°4′6″E
- Elevation: 58 metres (190 ft)
- System: Indian Railways station
- Owner: East Central Railway of the Indian Railways
- Operator: Danapur
- Lines: Patna–Sonepur–Hajipur section, Patna–Pehlejaghat–Chhapra-Siwan line
- Platforms: 5
- Tracks: 5
- Connections: No

Construction
- Structure type: Standard (on ground station)
- Parking: Available

Other information
- Status: Functioning
- Station code: PPTA
- Fare zone: East Central Railway

History
- Opened: 16 December 2015
- Electrified: 2013

Passengers
- 50,000 per day
Services
| Preceding station | Indian Railways | Following station |
East Central Railway
| Bharpura Pahleza Ghat Junction towards ? | Patna–Sonepur–Hajipur section Towards Patna Jn. | Terminus |
| Terminus | Patna–Mughalsarai section | Danapur towards ? |
Route map
Location
- Location within Patna Location within India Location within Bihar
- Interactive map of Patliputra Junction

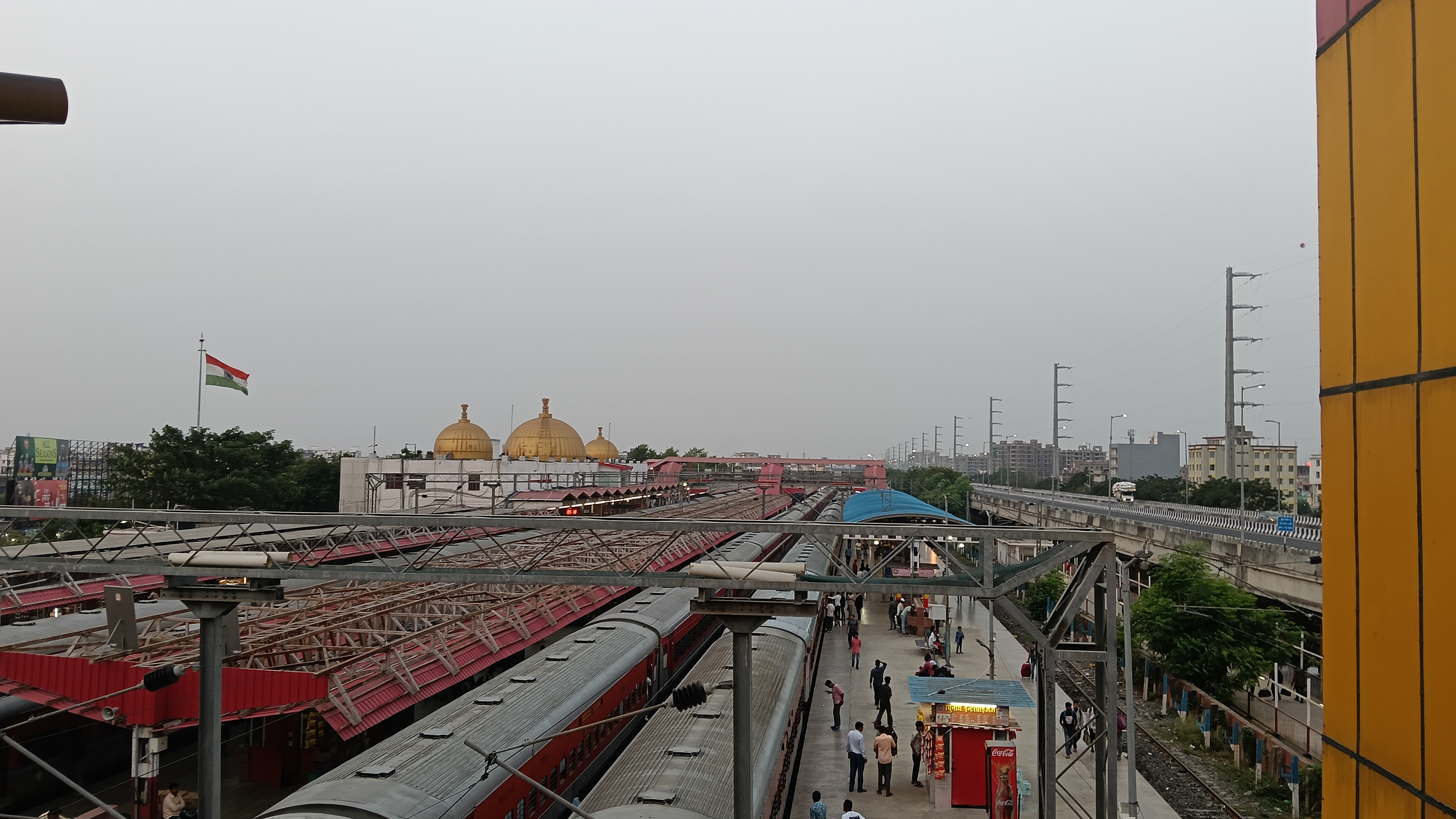
View of the Patliputra Railway Junction from a foot overbridge.

Patliputra Junction, Station code (PPTA), is a railway station in the Rukanpura area in the West End of Patna, Bihar. The station, which is governed by East Central Railway and managed by Danapur railway division, lies on the Patna–Sonepur–Hajipur section. Located 12 kilometres north-west of Patna Junction, it has primarily been developed to ease pressure on the city's other two railway stations, through which roughly 350 trains pass daily. It is located near Bailey Road, an important western thoroughfare in Patna. Patliputra junction has become the fourth terminal of the Danapur railway division after Patna Junction, Danapur station and Rajendranagar Terminal.

Patna lies in between New Delhi and Kolkata, one of the busiest rail routes in India. The city is a major railway hub and has six major stations: Patliputra Junction, Patna Junction, Danapur, Rajendranagar Terminal, Gulzarbagh, and Patna Sahib. In January 2016, the construction of India's longest road-cum-rail bridge, the Digha–Sonpur rail–road bridge, was completed on the banks of the Ganga nearby and connect Patna to Bharpura Pahleja Ghat (Sonpur). The bridge is 4.55 kilometres (2.83 miles) long and therefore, the longest road-cum-rail bridge in India as well as one of the longest in the world.

== History ==
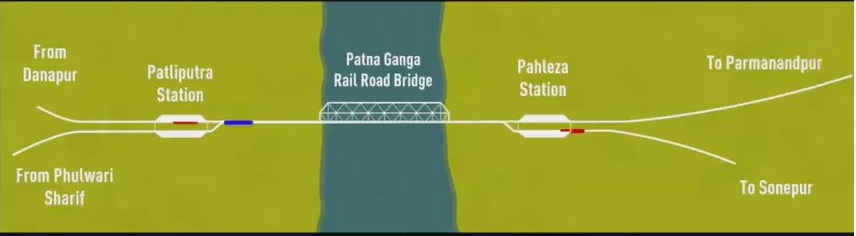
Patliputra and Bharpura Pahleja Ghat station on both sides of bridge

The Patliputra Junction railway station was built in 2013. The railway station is a part of Digha–Sonpur rail–road bridge between Digha and Sonepur which was completed by the end of 2015. This station was built an alternate to Patna Junction, Danapur station and Rajendranagar Terminal to decongest excess load on these stations. The station will be a terminal point for most of the train coming from North Bihar.

== Facilities ==
The major facilities available are waiting rooms, computerised reservation facility, reservation counter, vehicle parking etc. The vehicles are allowed to enter the station premises. There are refreshment rooms vegetarian and non vegetarian, tea stall, book stall, post and telegraphic office and government railway police office. Patliputra Junction is located close to the domestic airport providing transport to important destinations to all over India.

Automatic ticket vending machines have been installed to reduce the queue for train tickets on the station.

=== Platforms ===
There are three platforms with four railway tracks and all the platforms are connected with one main foot overbridge. Two more platforms are under construction.

=== New developments ===
In Feb 2012, The Indian Railways had planned to set up a Railway Station Development Corporation (RSDC) that will work on improving the major railway stations including Patliputra Junction by building and developing Restaurants, shopping areas and food plaza for commercial business and improving passenger amenities A new railway station has been constructed (Digha Bridge Halt railway station) at south end of bridge just south of Danapur Bankipur Road situated 3 km northward from Patliputra Junction. This makes traveling from Sonpur side very easy and passengers traveling to Gandhi Maidan will save money and at least 1.5 hours time than deboarding the trains at Patliputra Junction station.

=== Second exit point ===
Patliputra Junction will soon have a second exit point at the west-northern end. There will be a gate for movement to and from the platform (Pillar No. 216) from under AIIMS-Digha elevated road (Patli Path) near Patliputra Junction. From Rupaspur one will reach the junction by road from the side of the line. There is a plan to expand Digha-Danapur Canal Road near the footover bridge of Patliputra station by 120 meters in length and 7.5 meters in width. At present Rs 2 crore has been allocated for this. In August 2023, Bihar Urban Development and Housing Department has given administrative approval of Rs 4 crore 89 lakh 60 thousand.

== Trains ==
Patliputra Junction is served by a number of Indian Railways trains. The following table lists regular scheduled passenger services having a scheduled stoppage at Patliputra Junction (station code: PPTA). Temporary, seasonal and festival special trains are not included.

Regular trains serving Patliputra Junction
| Train number | Train name | Route | Frequency |
|---|---|---|---|
| 11015/11016 | Lokmanya Tilak Terminus–Saharsa Amrit Bharat Express | Mumbai LTT – Saharsa | Weekly |
| 11031/11032 | Panvel–Alipurduar Amrit Bharat Express | Panvel – Alipurduar | Weekly |
| 12141/12142 | Lokmanya Tilak Terminus–Patliputra Express | Mumbai LTT – Patliputra | Daily |
| 12149/12150 | Pune–Supaul Express | Pune – Supaul | Daily |
| 12423/12424 | Dibrugarh Rajdhani Express | Dibrugarh – New Delhi | Daily |
| 12487/12488 | Seemanchal Express | Jogbani – Anand Vihar Terminal | Daily |
| 12505/12506 | North East Express | Kamakhya – Anand Vihar Terminal | Daily |
| 12519/12520 | Lokmanya Tilak Terminus–Agartala AC Express | Mumbai LTT – Agartala | Weekly |
| 12529/12530 | Patliputra–Lucknow Superfast Express | Patliputra – Lucknow | 5 days a week |
| 13121/13122 | Kolkata–Ghazipur City Express | Kolkata – Ghazipur City | Weekly |
| 13205/13206 | Janhit Express | Purnia Court – Patliputra | 5 days a week |
| 13211/13212 | Jogbani–Danapur Express | Jogbani – Danapur | Daily |
| 13225/13226 | Jaynagar–Ara Intercity Express | Jaynagar – Ara | Daily |
| 14019/14020 | Tripura Sundari Express | Agartala – Firozpur Cantt | Weekly |
| 14037/14038 | Poorvottar Sampark Kranti Express | Silchar – New Delhi | Weekly |
| 14619/14620 | Tripura Sundari Express | Agartala – Firozpur Cantt | Weekly |
| 15033/15034 | Patliputra–Lucknow Express | Patliputra – Lucknow | 5 days a week |
| 15079/15080 | Patliputra–Gorakhpur Express | Patliputra – Gorakhpur | Daily |
| 15201/15202 | Patliputra–Bagaha Intercity Express | Patliputra – Bagaha | Daily |
| 15293/15294 | Muzaffarpur–Charlapalli Amrit Bharat Express | Muzaffarpur – Charlapalli | Weekly |
| 15515/15516 | Narkatiaganj–Danapur MEMU Express | Narkatiaganj – Danapur | Daily |
| 15547/15548 | Raxaul–Lokmanya Tilak Terminus Antyodaya Express | Raxaul – Mumbai LTT | Weekly |
| 15555/15556 | Patliputra–Bapudham Motihari MEMU Express | Patliputra – Bapudham Motihari | Daily |
| 15589/15590 | Muzaffarpur–Hadapsar AC Express | Muzaffarpur – Hadapsar | Weekly |
| 16601/16602 | Jogbani–Erode Amrit Bharat Express | Jogbani – Erode | Weekly |
| 18629/18630 | Ranchi–Gorakhpur Express | Ranchi – Gorakhpur | Weekly |
| 19669/19670 | Udaipur City–Patliputra Humsafar Express | Udaipur City – Patliputra | Weekly |
| 22351/22352 | Patliputra–Sir M. Visvesvaraya Terminal Superfast Express | Patliputra – SMVT Bengaluru | Weekly |
| 22355/22356 | Patliputra–Chandigarh Superfast Express | Patliputra – Chandigarh | Twice weekly |
| 22449/22450 | Poorvottar Sampark Kranti Express | Guwahati – New Delhi | Twice weekly |
| 26301/26302 | Jogbani–Danapur Vande Bharat Express | Jogbani – Danapur | 6 days a week |
| 26501/26502 | Gorakhpur–Patliputra Vande Bharat Express | Gorakhpur – Patliputra | 6 days a week |
| 13206 | Janhit Express | Patliputra – Purnia Court | 5 days a week |
| 13212 | Jogbani–Danapur Express | Danapur – Jogbani | Daily |
| 13225/13226 | Jaynagar–Ara Intercity Express | Jaynagar – Ara | Daily |
| 15505/15506 | Janhit Express | Saharsa – Patliputra | Twice weekly |
| 15549/15550 | Jaynagar–Patna Intercity Express | Jaynagar – Patna | Daily except Saturday |
| 03283/03284 | Barauni–Patna MEMU | Barauni – Patna | Daily |
| 03295/03296 | Barauni–Patliputra MEMU | Barauni – Patliputra | Daily |
| 03379/03380 | Barauni–Patna MEMU | Barauni – Patna | Daily |
| 05253/05254 | Muzaffarpur–Patliputra MEMU | Muzaffarpur – Patliputra | Daily |
| 05265/05266 | Darbhanga–Patliputra MEMU | Darbhanga – Patliputra | Daily |
| 05297/05298 | Patliputra–Chhapra MEMU | Patliputra – Chhapra | Daily |
| 63265/63266 | Ram Dayalu Nagar–Patliputra MEMU | Ram Dayalu Nagar – Patliputra | Daily |
| 63267/63268 | Muzaffarpur–Patliputra MEMU | Muzaffarpur – Patliputra | Daily |
| 63281/63282 | Patliputra–Patna MEMU | Patliputra – Patna | Daily |
| 63283/63284 | Barauni–Patna MEMU | Barauni – Patna | Daily |
| 63285/63286 | Barauni–Patliputra MEMU | Barauni – Patliputra | Daily |
| 63287/63288 | Barauni–Patliputra MEMU | Barauni – Patliputra | Daily |
| 63329/63330 | Gaya–Patliputra MEMU | Gaya – Patliputra | Daily |
| 75215/75216 | Raxaul–Patliputra DEMU | Raxaul – Patliputra | Daily |

=== Special and seasonal trains ===
In addition to the regular services, Patliputra Junction is periodically served by additional Indian Railways special trains, including festival, summer and other seasonal services. These trains are not included in the regular-train table because their schedules and periods of operation are subject to change.

"Patliputra Railway Station (PPTA) — trains and timetable". RailRoute.

"Patliputra Junction — All Trains". IndianRailways.info.

"Jogbani–Danapur Vande Bharat Express". RailJournal.

== See also ==
- Danapur railway station
