= Patna–Sonepur–Hajipur section =

Railway line in India

Patna–Sonepur–Hajipur line
- Indian Railways line
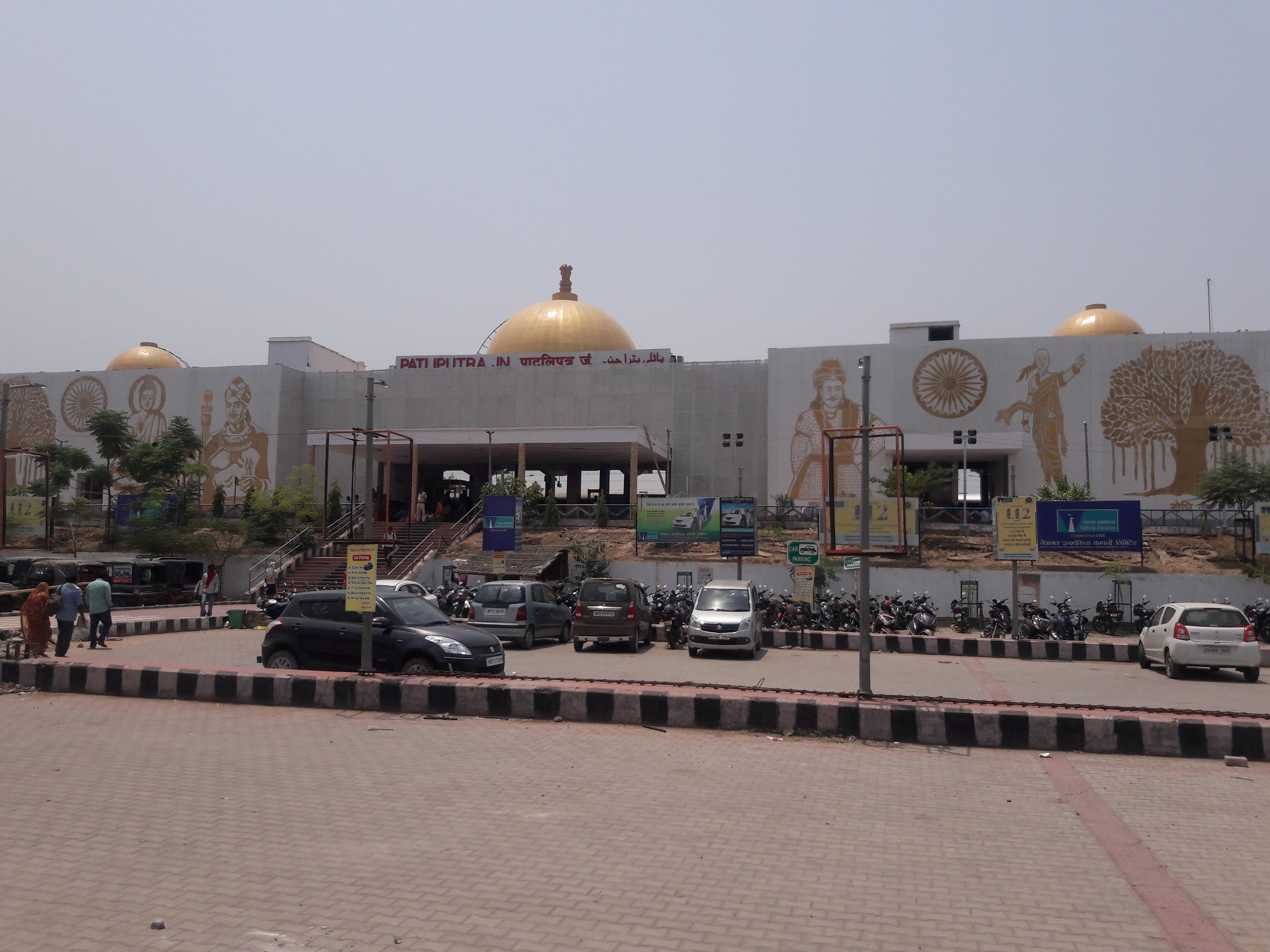
- Patliputra Junction an important railway station on Patna–Sonepur–Hajipur section

Overview
- Status: Operational
- Owner: Indian Railways
- Locale: Bihar
- Termini: Patna; Hajipur
- Stations: Hajipur, Sonepur, Patliputra, Patna

Service
- Operator: East Central Railway

History
- Opened: 3 February 2016

Technical
- Line length: 21 km (13 mi)
- Number of tracks: 2
- Track gauge: 5 ft 6 in (1,676 mm) broad gauge
- Electrification: 25 kV 50 Hz AC OHLE (between Sonepur–Hajipur 2011–December 2014)
- Operating speed: up to 60 km/h (37 mph)

The Patna–Sonepur–Hajipur section is a railway line connecting Patna to Hajipur in the Indian state of Bihar. The 21 km (13 mi) line passes through the Digha–Sonpur rail–road bridge, connecting South Bihar and North Bihar, and the Gangetic Plain in Bihar. The electrification work in Patna–Sonepur–Hajipur section was completed by July 2016.
