= Hajipur Junction railway station =

Railway station in Vaishali, Bihar, India

HAJIPUR JUNCTION

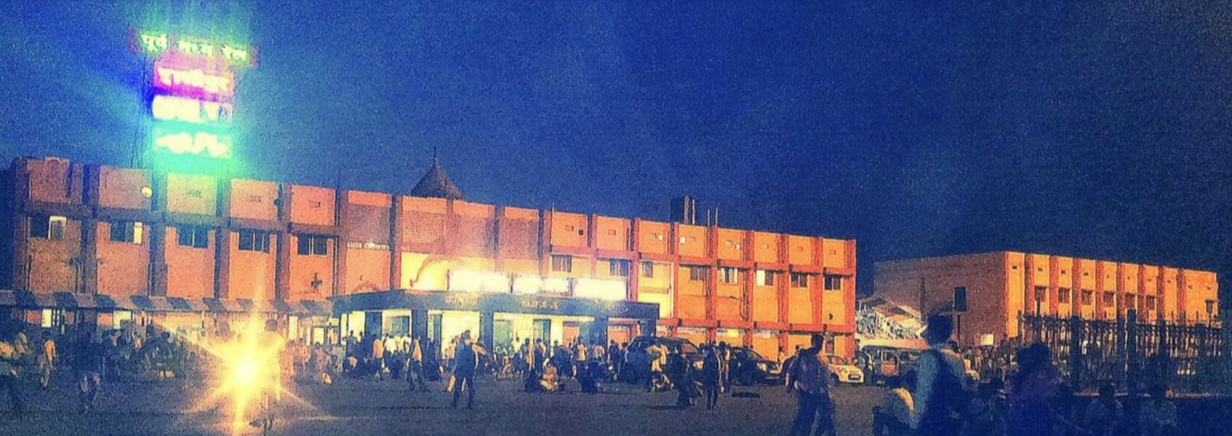
- Main entrance of Hajipur Jn.

General information
- Location: Station Rd, Hajipur- 844101, Bihar; India
- Coordinates: 25°42′8″N 85°12′55″E
- Elevation: 55 metres (180 ft)
- System: Express train and Passenger train station
- Owner: Indian Railways
- Operator: East Central Railway
- Lines: Patna–Sonepur–Hajipur section; Muzaffarpur–Hajipur section; Hajipur–Chhapra Section; Barauni–Gorakhpur line; Barauni–Hajipur Chord Line; Hajipur—Sagauli line Under Construction
- Platforms: 5
- Tracks: 8
- Connections: Bus, Auto, Taxi, Cab

Construction
- Structure type: Standard (on-ground station)
- Parking: Available
- Accessible: Yes

Other information
- Status: Functioning (Wi-Fi enabled)
- Station code: HJP
- Zone(s): East Central Railway
- Division(s): Sonpur

History
- Opened: 1862; 164 years ago
- Electrified: (2013–2016); 25 kV 50 Hz AC (Double Electric–line)
- Former names: East Indian Railway

Passengers
- 70,000/day

Services
04 Rajdhani, 02 Garib Rath,
130 Superfast/Mail/Express,
20 Passenger/Demu/Memu trains
Route map
Location
- Location within Bihar Location within India
- Interactive map

Hajipur Junction, (station code HJP), is a major railway station and headquarters in the Sonpur division of East Central Railway zone of the Indian Railways. Hajipur Junction is located in Hajipur city in the Indian state of Bihar. Hajipur is the district headquarters of Vaishali district and is located at 33 km by rail route from Patna Junction. East Central Railway was inaugurated on 8 September 1996 with headquarters at Hajipur, Bihar. It became operational on 1 October 2002.

Hajipur is well connected with various major cities of Bihar like Patna, Sonpur, Vaishali, Muzaffarpur, Samastipur, Chhapra and Siwan. Hajipur Junction railway station is directly connected to most of the major cities in India.

== History ==
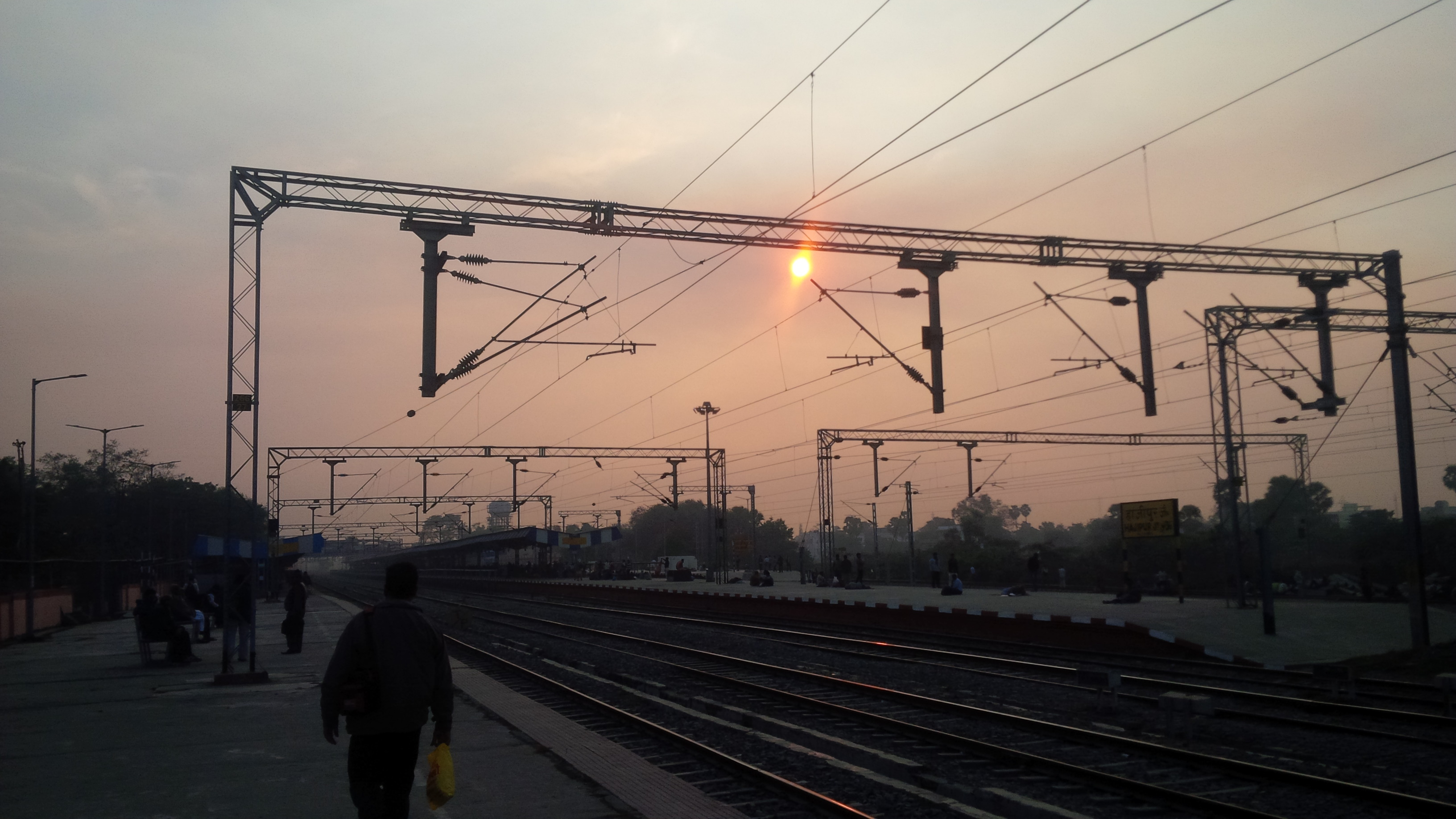
Hajipur Station view

The construction of railway line through Hajipur was completed and opened in 1862. Hajipur is the headquarters of the East Central Railway zone of the Indian Railways.

The 51 km (32 mi)-long Hajipur–Muzaffarpur line was opened in 1884. A new second bridge on river Gandak has been opened (5.5 km) between Sonpur Junction and Hajipur for double line traffic for this section. The electrification work in Patna–Sonepur–Hajipur section was completed by July 2016.

== Lines ==
Three rail lines connect the station to Muzaffarpur, Chhapra, Vaishali and Barauni.

== Facilities ==
The major facilities are mechanised cleaning, free Wi-Fi in entire Junction, available are waiting rooms, computerised reservation facility, reservation counter, vehicle parking etc. There are five platforms that are interconnected with two foot overbridges.

Facilities include waiting rooms, computerized reservation facility. A new entry point has been constructed and commissioned on west side in addition to previous one on East side. This railway station is also equipped with RailTel WI-FI facility provided by joint venture Indian Railways and Google.

== Trains ==
Hajipur Junction served by several Express and Superfast trains from all over the country. Several electrified local Passenger trains also run from Hajipur Junction to neighbouring destinations on frequent intervals.

The 21 km (13 mi) line passes through the Digha–Sonpur rail–road bridge, connecting North Bihar and South Bihar, and the Gangetic Plain in Bihar. The new track of the 148.3 km (92.1 mi) long Hajipur–Sugauli via Vaishali line. The 59 km (37 mi) long existing Chhapra–Hajipur line was being doubled.

== Nearest airports ==
1. Lok Nayak Jayaprakash Airport, Patna 19 kilometres (12 mi)
2. Gaya Airport 123 kilometres (76 mi)
3. Darbhanga Airport 139 kilometres (86 mi)

== See also ==
- East Central Railway zone

Hajipur travel guide from Wikivoyage
