= Digha–Sonpur Bridge =

Indian bridge over Ganga river connecting Patna and Sonpur

Digha–Sonpur Rail–Road Bridge (J.P. Setu) Digha Pul
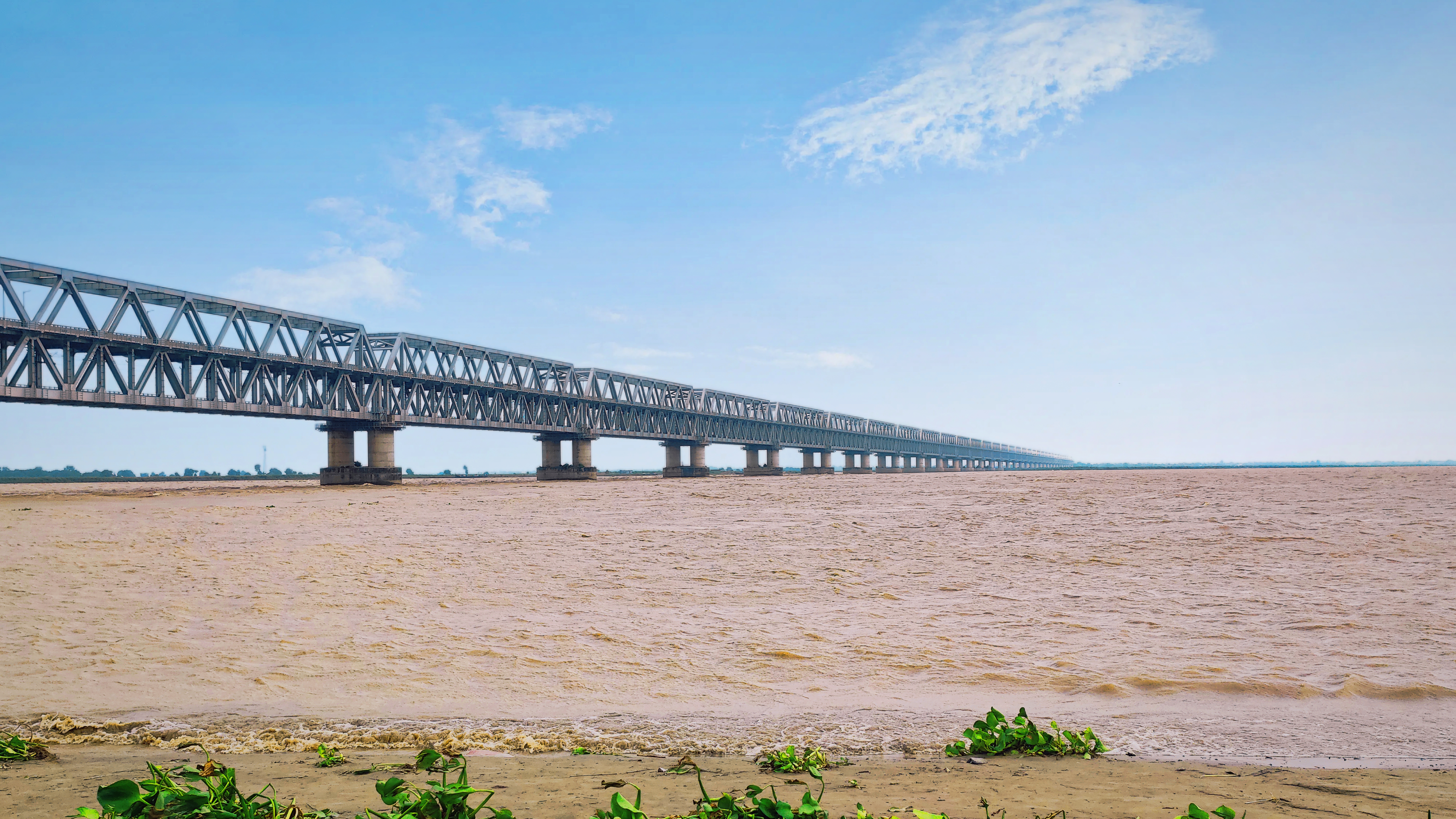
- Digha–Sonpur JP Setu
- Coordinates: 25°40′05″N 85°06′30″E
- Crosses: Ganges
- Locale: Digha–Sonpur

Characteristics
- Design: Warren truss and double Warren truss
- Total length: 4,556 metres (14,948 ft)
- Width: 10 metres (33 ft)
- Longest span: 123 metres (404 ft)
- No. of spans: 36
- No. of lanes: 2

Rail characteristics
- No. of tracks: 2

History
- Construction start: 2003
- Construction end: August 2015
- Opened: 3 February 2016

Statistics
- Daily traffic: 14 pair of trains

Location
- Interactive map of Digha–Sonpur Rail–Road Bridge (J.P. Setu)

The Digha–Sonpur bridge (Hindi: दीघा-सोनपुर पुल) or J. P. Setu (Hindi: जेपी सेतु) is a rail-cum-road steel truss bridge across river Ganga, connecting Digha Ghat in Patna and Pahleja Ghat in Sonpur. It is named after Indian independence activist Jayaprakash Narayan. It provides easy roadway and railway link between north and south Bihar.

It is 4,556m in length and the second longest rail-cum-road bridge in India, after Bogibeel Bridge in Assam. Rail service was inaugurated on this route on 3 February 2016.

This is second railway bridge in Bihar after Rajendra Setu that connects North Bihar to South Bihar. Indian Railways has constructed two railway stations on either sides of the bridge – Patliputra Junction (PPTA) and Bharpura Pahleja Ghat Junction (PHLG).

== The project ==
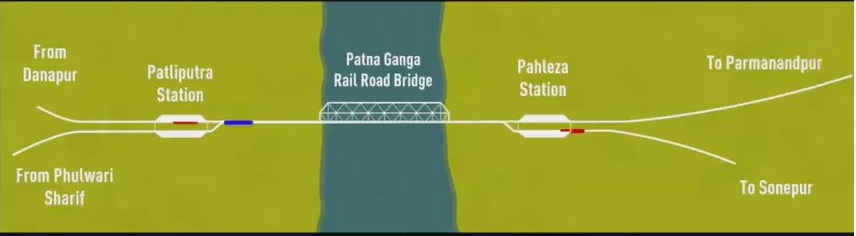
Patliputra and Bharpura Pahleja Ghat station on both sides of bridge

Rajendra Setu was the only bridge that carried railway tracks across the Ganges in the state of Bihar till 3 February 2016. It was opened in 1959.

On 22 December 1996 Former Prime Minister H. D. Deve Gowda laid the foundation stone for the construction of the railway bridge over Ganga at Sonepur. Ram Vilas Paswan was the railway minister at that time, but the physical work on the bridge began in 2003 when Nitish Kumar was the railway minister. The Digha–Sonpur Ganga bridge was initially sanctioned as a rail bridge; the project was converted to a rail-cum-road bridge in 2006. Total cost of the project was put at ₹13,890 million, out of which ₹8,350 million was for the rail part, and ₹5,540 million was for the road part. It was expected to be completed in five years. The construction work on the bridge was completed in August 2015, and a trial run of a diesel locomotive was undertaken on the bridge in the same month.

Digha–Sonpur Bridge project was executed by Ircon International and the bridge was completed at ₹1,570 crore (US$170 million). The electrification work on the Patna-Sonepur-Hajipur Section was completed by July 2016. The doubling of railway tracks on the bridge started in May 2018, and is being done at an estimated cost of Rs 156.09 crore and will be completed by December 2019.

Construction of the bridge being completed, the inaugural commercial run on the rail bridge took place on 3 February 2016. The Digha–Sonepur rail bridge was officially inaugurated by Prime Minister Narendra Modi on 12 March 2016. The second rail track is still to be laid. A new railway station Digha Bridge Halt (दीघा ब्रिज हॉल्ट) was constructed 3 km north from Patliputra Junction, near Danapur Bankipur road and opened for passengers on 25 November 2017. It saves time for rail passengers going to Gandhi Maidan at least 1 hour. The road bridge was inaugurated on 11 June 2017. Link roads to connect National Highways on both ends are completed. The total length of construction, including approaches, is 20 km. It is a K-truss bridge. There are two rail tracks (up and down tracks) and a two lane road.

Its south link road which is also called as AIIMS- Digha elevated road (Patli Path) completed in December 2020.

== Politicking ==
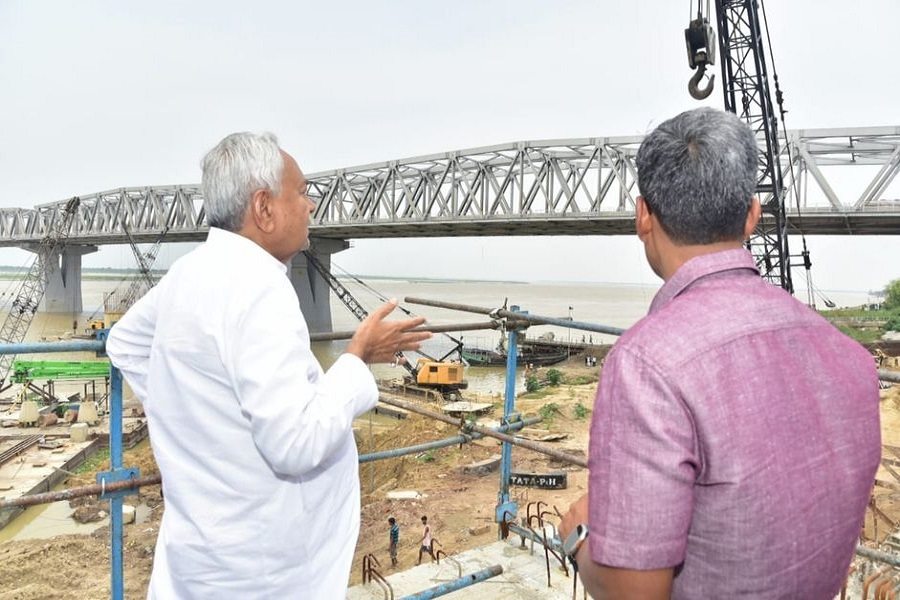
Chief Minister of Bihar Nitish Kumar inspecting JP Setu in 2023.

In 1996, survey work for the proposed bridge was initiated by the Railways at three possible sites – Digha–Sonepur, Gulzarbagh–Hajipur and Ict Ghat–Sonepur. Ram Vilas Paswan was then the Union Railway Minister and he lent his support to the Gulzarbagh-Hajipur site, as Hajipur was the constituency from which he was elected. Lalu Prasad Yadav, then Chief Minister of Bihar, lent his support to the Digha–Sonepur site. In the wake of the conflicting support of the political heavy weights, disturbances broke out at Sonepur. One person was shot dead. Many experts opined in favour of building the rail bridge adjacent to the Mahatma Gandhi Setu, the road bridge connecting Hajipur with Patna. However, political opinion prevailed and the Digha–Sonepur site was selected. ₹24 million was spent on the survey alone. The proposal to construct the bridge was mentioned in the union budget of 1997-98 and at that time the estimated cost was ₹600 crores. The bridge was finally sanctioned during the term as Union Railway Minister of Nitish Kumar, present Chief Minister of Bihar. The scope of work was expanded when Lalu Prasad Yadav was the Union Railway Minister.

== Service ==
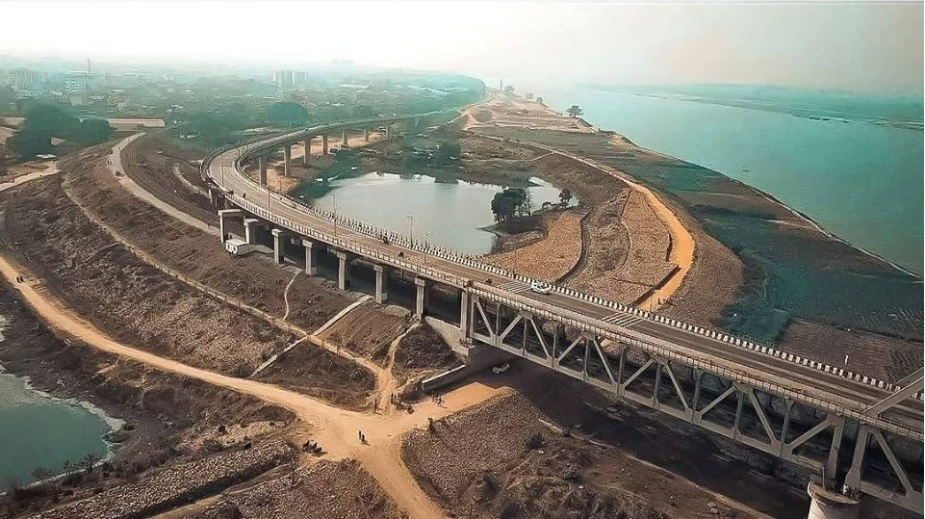
Digha pahleja bridge

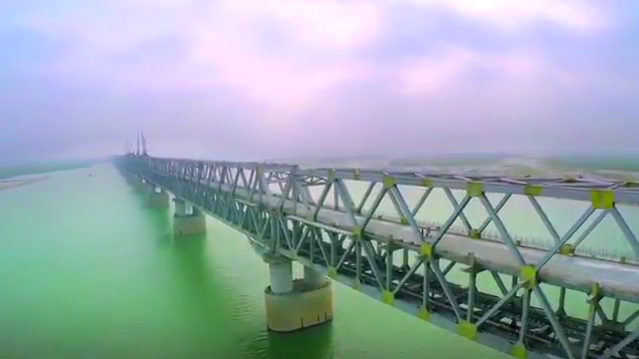
JP setu

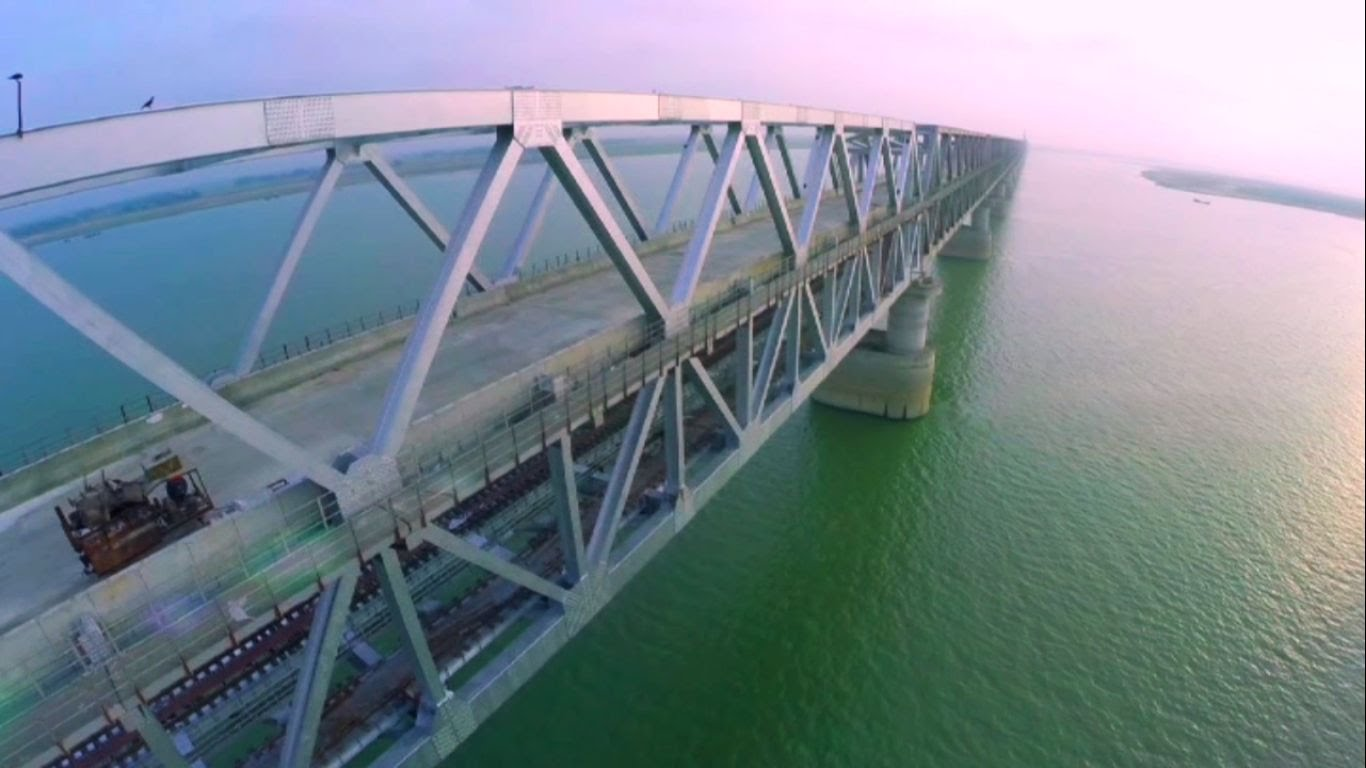
Panoramic view of Digha Sonpur bridge

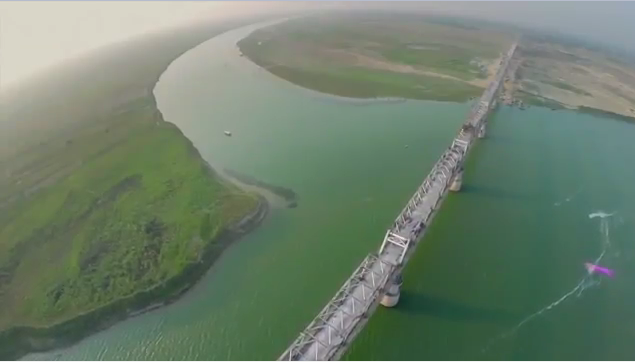
Overview of JP setu

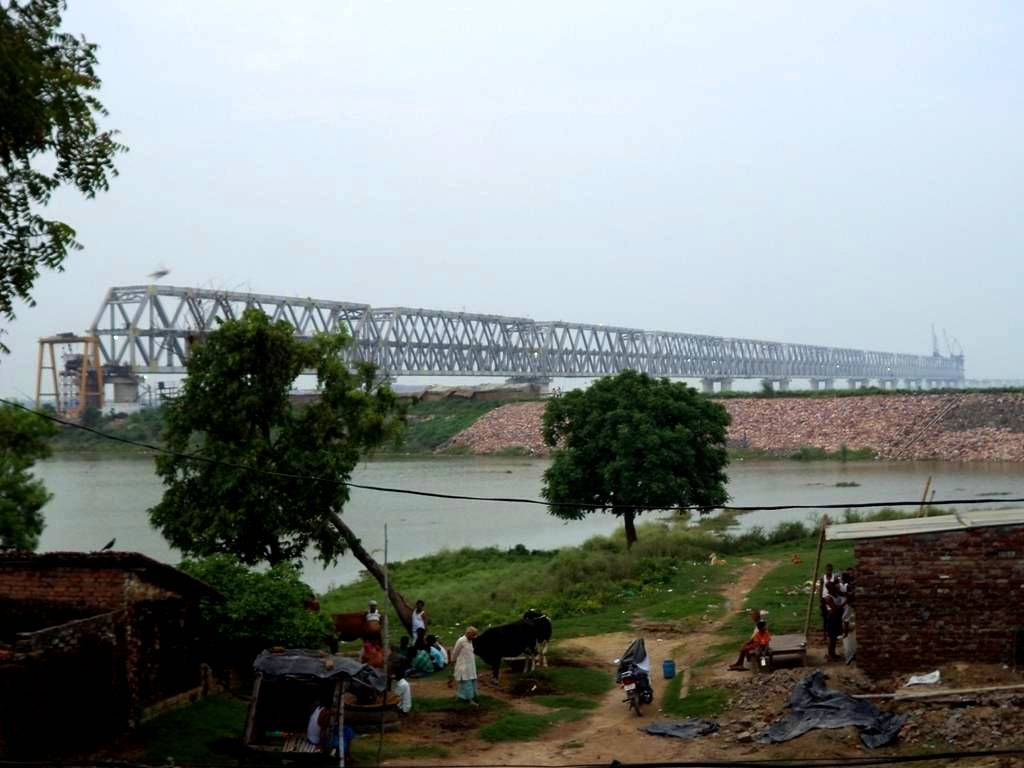
Under-construction view of JP setu

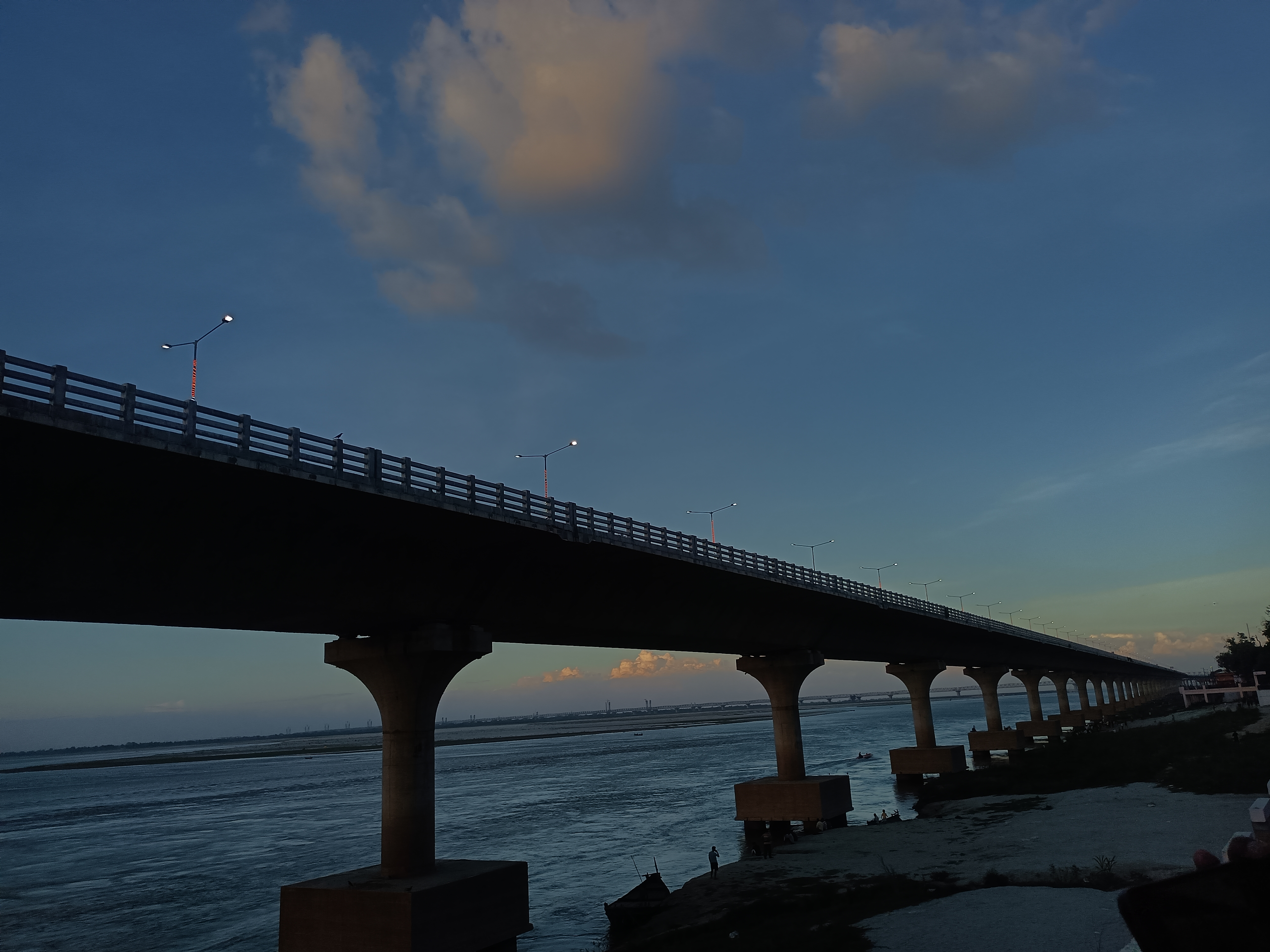
Digha-Sonpur Bridge from Ghandi Ghat

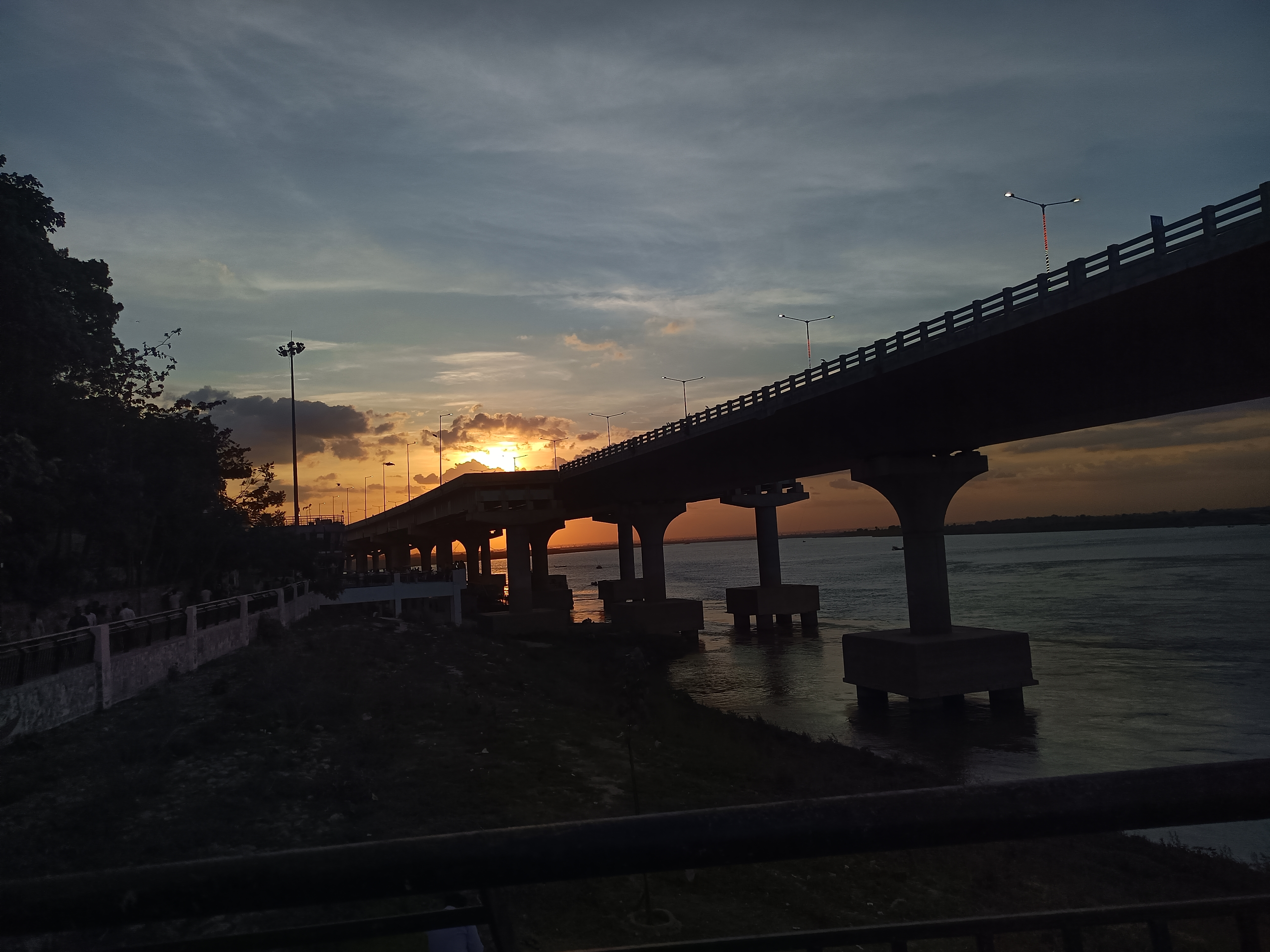
Sunset View

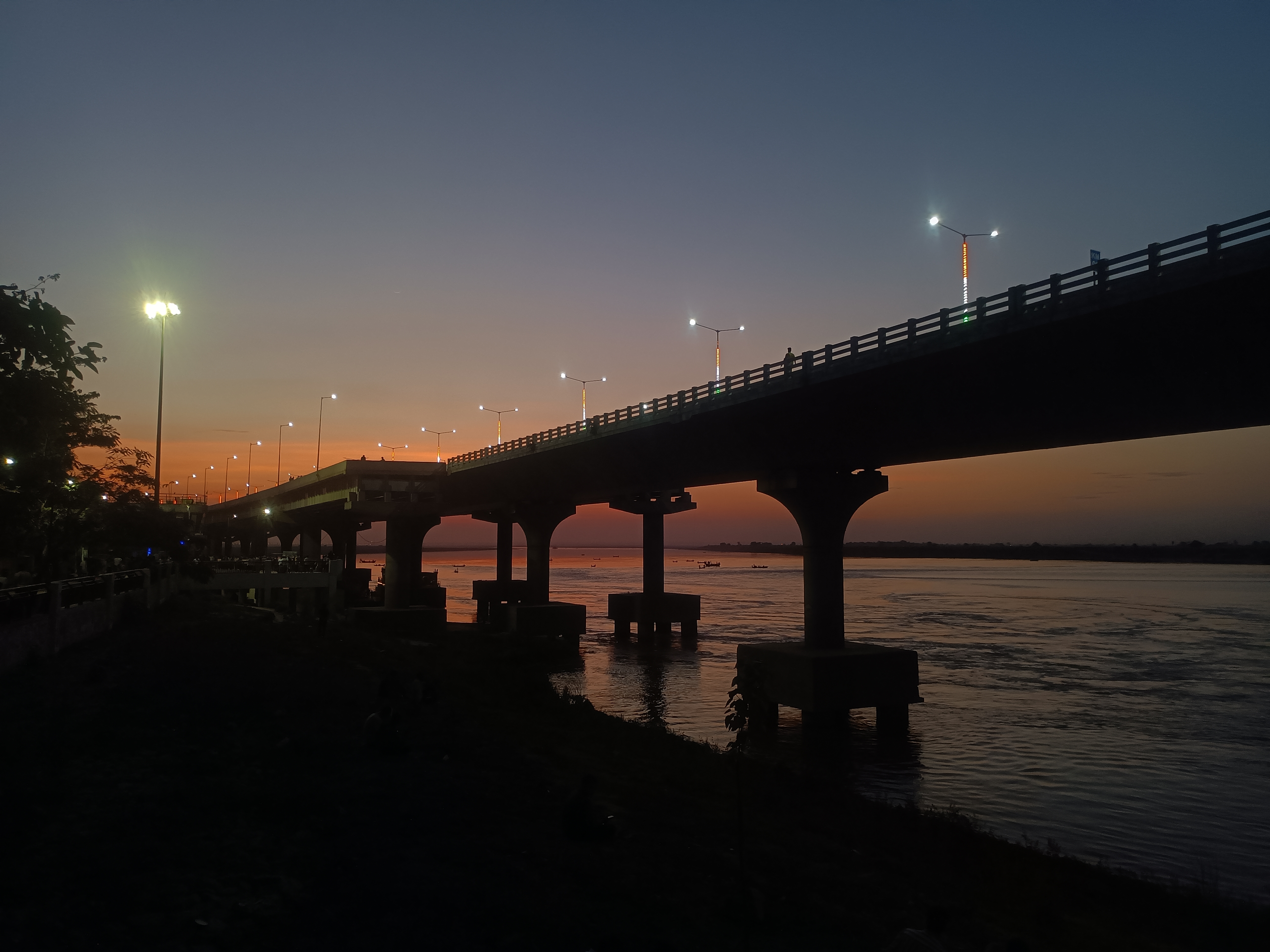
Evening View

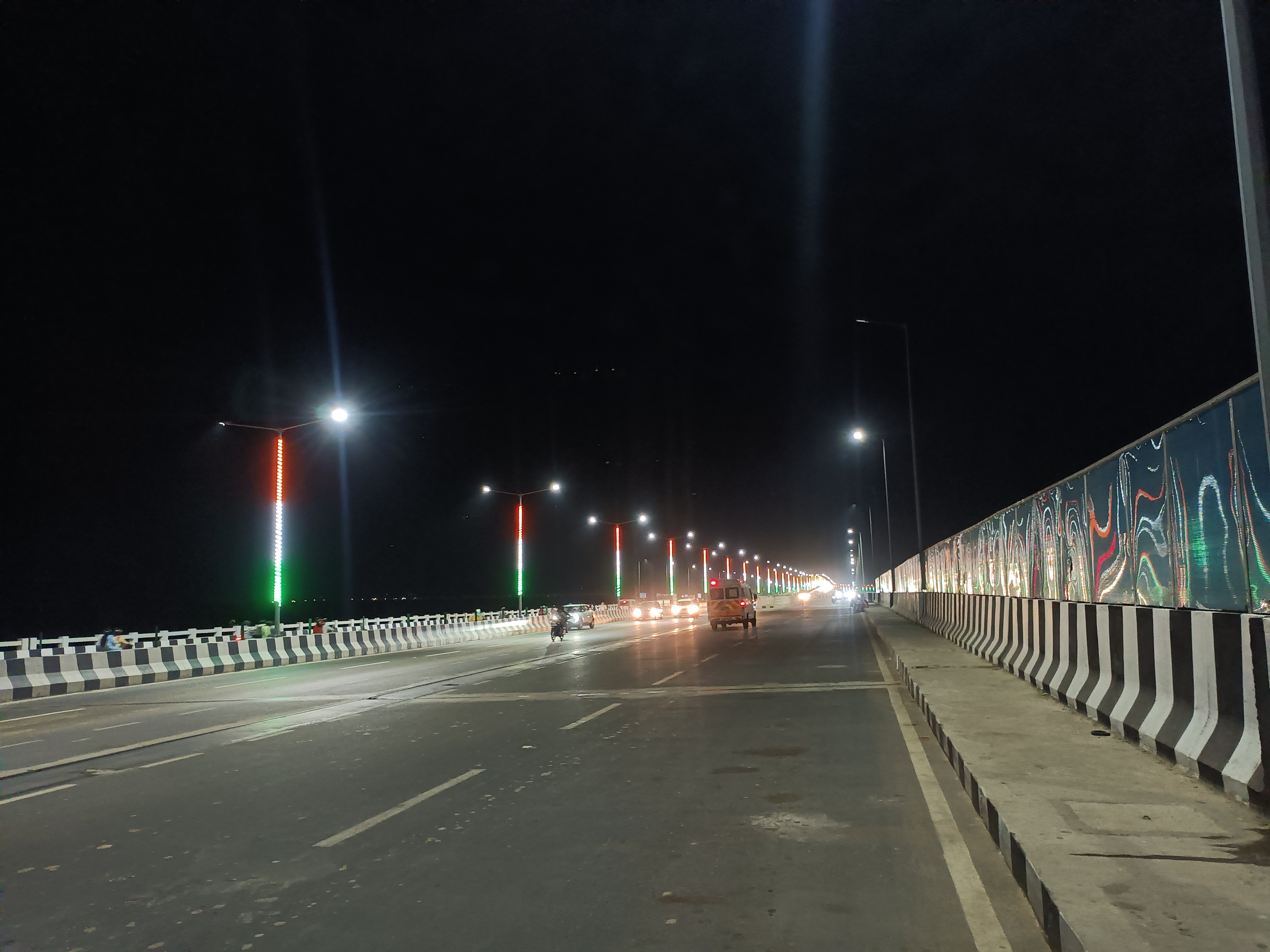
After Complition

Regularly scheduled passenger service was inaugurated on this route on 3 February 2016. Initially, six services will utilize the bridge connecting Patna with North Bihar and parts of Uttar Pradesh. Diesel Multiple Unit trains from Patliputra Junction to Barauni Junction via Sonepur, Hajipur, Shahpur Patori, to Gorakhpur Junction via Chhapra, Siwan, Thawe and Kaptanganj, and to Gorakhpur Junction via Hajipur, Muzaffarpur, Raxaul and Narkatiaganj are among the initial services.

Many of long distance Patna-bound trains going to northeast have already been shifted to this northerly route easing the burden on the heavily congested Mughalsarai-Patna rail line.

=== Roll-on/roll-off ===
In May 2016, Roll-on/roll-off (RO-RO) service was introduced from Bihta (private freight terminal) to Turki station in Muzaffarpur district covering a distance of 88 km through the Digha–Sonepur rail-cum-road bridge. This is second such service in India. Before this, Railways started RoRo services in the Konkan region. The railway wagons ferry loaded trucks to their destination. This is started by Railways to attract more loadings, reduce carbon emission and reduce load on Mahatma Gandhi Setu. Approximately 44 loaded or empty trucks move in a rake and one rake do three trips a day. Ferrying of trucks weighing 15 MT (metric tonnes) cost ₹4,107 (US$44) and of empty trucks of average 6 MT (metric tonnes) weight ₹2,806 (US$30). Similarly, trucks weighing over 15 MT are charged ₹200 more for every tonne over 15MT. The maximum weight allowed is 66 MT. From 3 July onwards, starting destination is changed to Danapur instead of Bihita.

== Bridges across the Ganges in Bihar ==
The Ganges divides the state of Bihar in two parts. The mighty river makes communication between the two parts a difficult task.

- The first effort to bridge the gap was Rajendra Setu in 1959.
- The next bridge across the Ganges in Bihar was the 5,575 metres (18,291 ft) Mahatma Gandhi Setu, the longest bridge in India at the time of its commissioning in 1982.
- It was followed by Vikramshila Setu near Bhagalpur.
- The fourth bridge across the Ganges in the state is the Digha–Sonpur rail–road bridge.
- The Srikrishna Setu Munger Ganga Bridge was formally opened for passenger trains on 11 April 2016. The road on the Shrikrishna Setu and the approach roads are now complete, and was inaugurated for traffic in February 2022.
- A fourth rail bridge over Ganga has been sanctioned at Bikramshila–Kataria with 18 km new rail line between Pirpainti and Naugachhia at cost of rupees 1601 Crore taking in consideration for access to north Bihar from Jharkhand by Jasidih Pirpainti new rail line under construction.
- Another 9.76-kilometre-long (6.06 mi) 6-lane road bridge is already under construction at Patna connecting Kachchi Dargah in Patna and Bidupur in Vaishali.
- Construction work of a double-track rail bridge, 25 meters upstream from present Rajendra Pul was inaugurated on 12 March 2016 by Prime Minister Narendra Modi while inaugurating Patna Lucknow Intercity express.
- A 5.575-kilometre-long (3.464 mi) bridge Bakhtiyarpur-Tajpur Bridge is under construction which will connect Bakhtiyarpur and Tajpur.
- The Arrah–Chhapra Bridge across the Ganges is complete, which connects Arrah and Chhapra and opened to traffic on 11 June 2017.
- A road bridge parallel to the existing rail and road bridge, Rajendra Setu, has also been planned.
- Another 4 lane road bridge is under construction at Sultanganj Sultanganj-Aguani Ghat Bridge
- A 4 lane road bridge is also under construction at Manihari in Katihar district which will connect to Sahibganj in Jharkhand Sahibganj-Maniharighat Bridge

== See also ==
- Koilwar Bridge
- List of road–rail bridges
- List of longest bridges above water in India
- Loknayak Ganga Path
- Kacchi Dargah–Bidupur Bridge
- Bogibeel Bridge
