= Mansi–Saharsa line =

Railway line in India

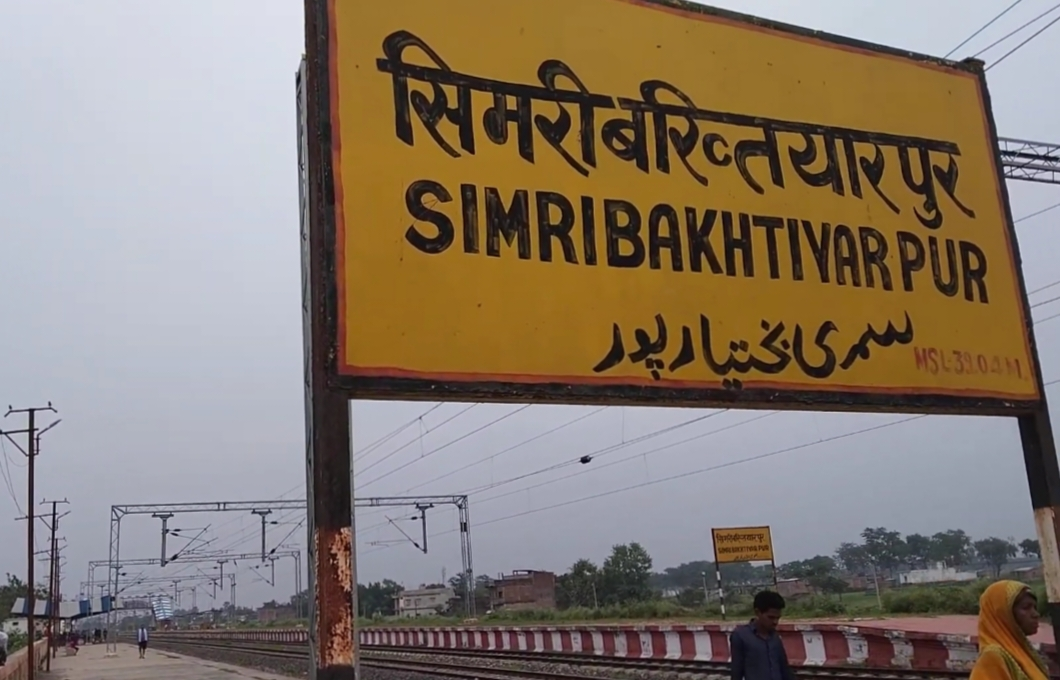
- Simri Bakhtiyarpur is an important Railway Station on Mansi–Saharsa line

Overview
- Status: Operational
- Owner: Indian Railways
- Locale: Bihar, India
- Termini: Mansi Junction; Saharsa Junction
- Stations: 10

Service
- Type: Single electric line
- Operator: East Central Railway zone

History
- Opened: 1907; 119 years ago

Technical
- Line length: 41 km (25 mi)
- Number of tracks: 1
- Track gauge: 1,676 mm (5 ft 6 in)
- Electrification: Yes
- Operating speed: 100 km/h (62 mph)

Mansi–Saharsa line is a single 5 ft 6 in (1,676 mm) broad-gauge track from Mansi Junction to Saharsa Junction of Bihar state. The line connects Saharsa, headquarter of Kosi Division, to Mansi, a railway junction that provides access to Barauni–Guwahati line. The whole line falls under Samastipur Division of East Central Railway.

== History ==
The first meter gauge track on the Mansi–Saharsa line was laid on 1 March 1907 between Bhaptiahi, Saharsa, and Simri Bakhtiyarpur, and later extended up to Mansi on 15 December 1907. The gauge conversion of this section to broad gauge was completed in 2005.

=== Conversion to double-track ===
On 30 June 2026, the Indian Railways approved the conversion of the corridor from single-track to double-track at ₹499 crore to reduce congestion on the line.

== Incidents ==
The Mansi–Saharsa railway line has witnessed two major tragedies. The Kosi train disaster on 6 June 1981 occurred when a passenger train derailed and plunged into the Bagmati River near Balahi, claiming an estimated 500 to 800 lives. On 19 August 2013, the Saharsa–Patna Rajya Rani Express ran over pilgrims at Dhamara Ghat station, killing over 28 people and triggering violent protests. Both incidents highlighted the safety challenges and infrastructure vulnerabilities of this flood-prone region.

== Trains ==
- Bandra Terminus–Saharsa Humsafar Express
- Vaishali Express
- Saharsa–Amritsar Garib Rath Express
- Saharsa–Patna Rajya Rani Express
- Poorbiya Express
- Janhit Express
- Hate Bazare Express
- Saharsa–Amritsar Jan Sadharan Express (via Chandigarh)
- Purnia Court–Amritsar Jan Sewa Express
- Saharsa–Barauni Express
- Janaki Intercity Express
- Saharsa–Anand Vihar Terminal Jan Sadharan Express
- Saharsa–Amritsar Jan Sadharan Express (via Sirhind)
- Kosi Express
- Saharsa–Rajendra Nagar Terminal Intercity Express

== See also ==
- Indian Railways
- Mansi Junction
- Saharsa Junction
- Simri Bakhtiyarpur
- Samastipur railway division
- Kosi Division
- East Central Railway zone
