= Simri Bakhtiyarpur railway station =

Railway station in Saharsa, Bihar, India

SIMRI BAKHTIYARPUR

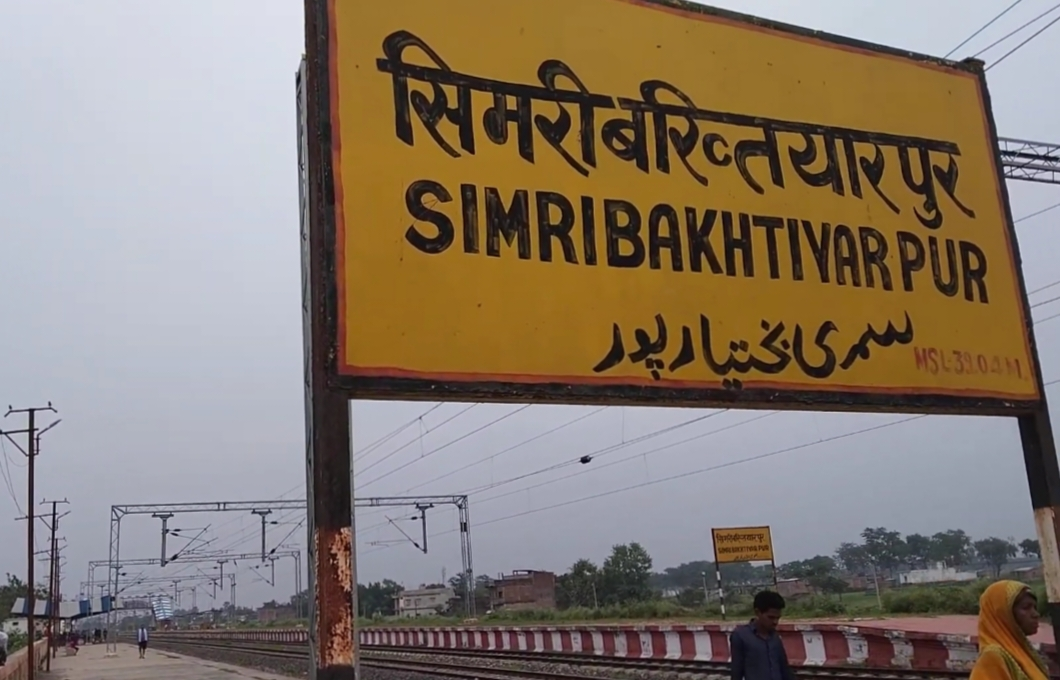
- Simri Bakhtiyarpur Railway Station

General information
- Location: Nawab Market, Station Road, Simri Bakhtiyarpur, Saharsa district, Bihar, 852127; India
- Coordinates: 25.7200°N 86.5973°E
- Elevation: 39 metres (128 ft)
- System: Indian Railways station
- Owner: Indian Railways
- Operator: East Central
- Line: Mansi–Saharsa line
- Platforms: 2
- Tracks: 3
- Connections: Regular station for passenger and MEMU trains

Construction
- Structure type: Standard (on-ground station)
- Parking: Yes
- Cycle facilities: No
- Accessible: Limited

Other information
- Status: Operational
- Station code: SBV
- Zone(s): East Central Railway Zone
- Division(s): Samastipur

History
- Opened: 1889

Passengers
- High (daily average footfall)

Services
- Preceding station: Koparia
- Following station: Saharsa Junction
Location
- Location within Bihar Location within India

Simri Bakhtiyarpur Railway Station (station code: SBV), is a railway station located in the town of Simri Bakhtiyarpur, in the Saharsa district of the Indian state of Bihar. The station is a part of the East Central Railway Zone, under the Samastipur Division of Indian Railways. It serves as a crucial stop on the Barauni-Katihar-Saharsa section, connecting the region with major cities and towns across Bihar and neighboring states.

Situated at an elevation of 39 meters (128 ft) above sea level, Simri Bakhtiyarpur Railway Station features two platforms and handles multiple passenger and MEMU Train daily. It is well-connected with nearby towns such as Saharsa, Madhepura, and Katihar, and serves as an essential hub for commuters, especially in northern Bihar.

The station is equipped with basic passenger amenities, including waiting areas, ticket counters, parking facilities, and food stalls. Additionally, the station is fully electrified and supports the operation of various local and regional trains.

Simri Bakhtiyarpur Railway Station is undergoing redevelopment under the Amrit Bharat Station Scheme, aimed at modernizing infrastructure and enhancing passenger amenities.

== Strategic importance ==
Simri Bakhtiyarpur Railway Station serves as a key railway hub for the surrounding regions, including Salkhua, Dhamara Ghat, Simri Bakhtiyarpur, and Sonbarsa Raj. Due to its proximity to these areas, it provides a more convenient option compared to Saharsa Junction, which is located approximately 22 kilometers away.

== Facilities ==
Simri Bakhtiyarpur Railway Station offers key facilities for passengers, including ticket counters, waiting rooms, food stalls, clean restrooms, parking facilities, wheelchair accessibility, sheltered platforms, a digital passenger information system, and a public address system for announcements. These amenities ensure a comfortable and accessible experience for all travelers.

== Major trains ==
- Saharsa–Amritsar Garib Rath Express
- Saharsa–Patna Rajya Rani Express
- Poorbiya Express
- Janhit Express
- Hate Bazare Express
- Saharsa–Amritsar Jan Sadharan Express (via Chandigarh)
- Saharsa–Amritsar Jan Sewa Express
- Saharsa–Barauni Express
- Janaki Intercity Express
- Saharsa–Anand Vihar Terminal Jan Sadharan Express
- Saharsa–Amritsar Jan Sadharan Express (via Sirhind)
- Kosi Express
- Saharsa–Rajendra Nagar Terminal Intercity Express
- 05291-Saharsa–Samastipur Memu special
- 05509-Saharsa- Jamalpur Passenger special
- 05573-Jhanjharpur- Patliputra Memu express special
- 05275-Saharsa- Samastipur Memu special
- 05221-Saharsa- Samastipur Demu special
- 03387-Patliputra- special fare special
- 03349-Danapur- special fare special
- 05243-Saharsa -Samastipur memu special
- 05549-Saharsa- Samastipur passenger special
- 05565-SIR Express special
- 05277-Saharsa- Samastipur memu special

== Image ==
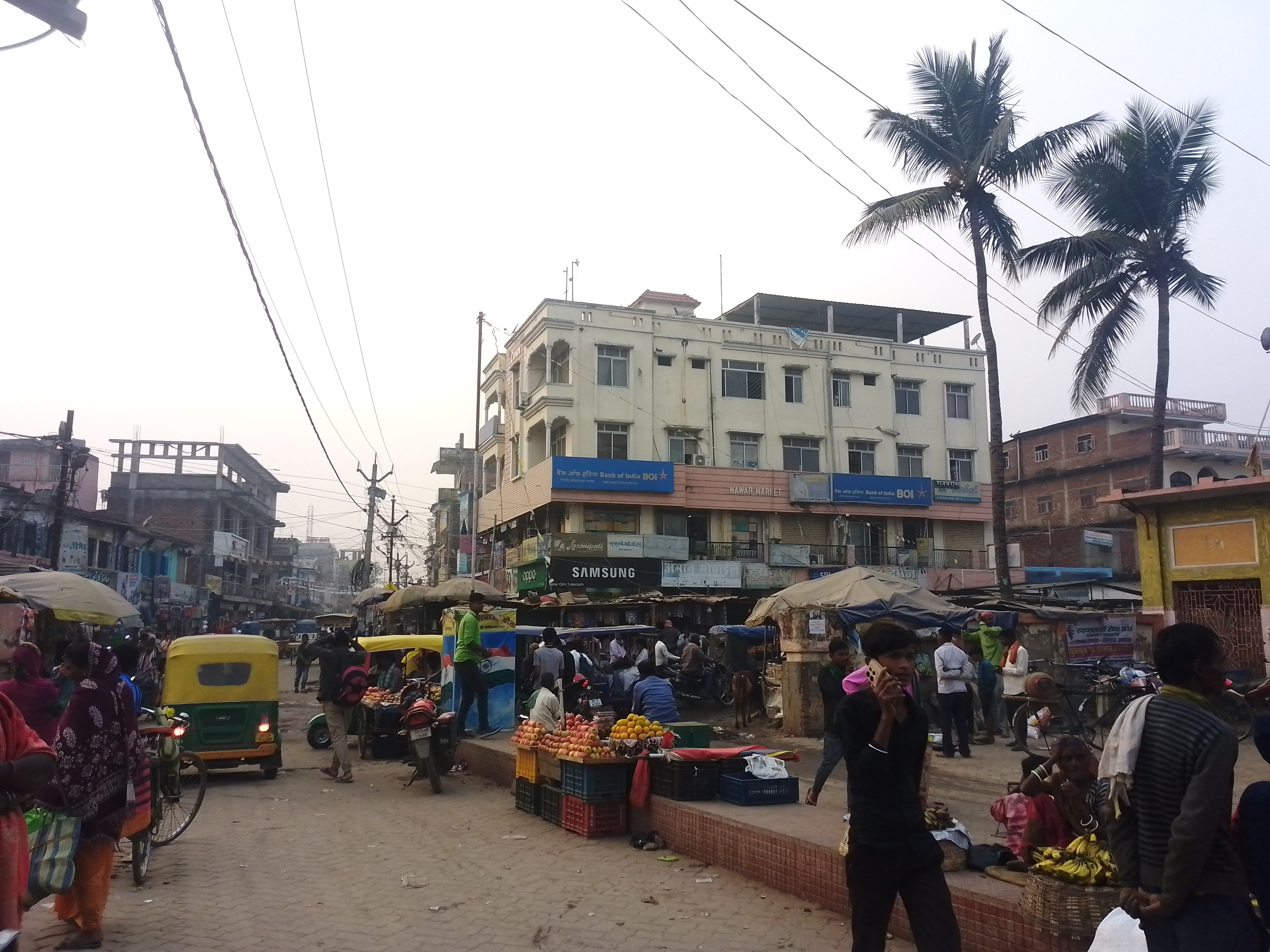
View after exit from station

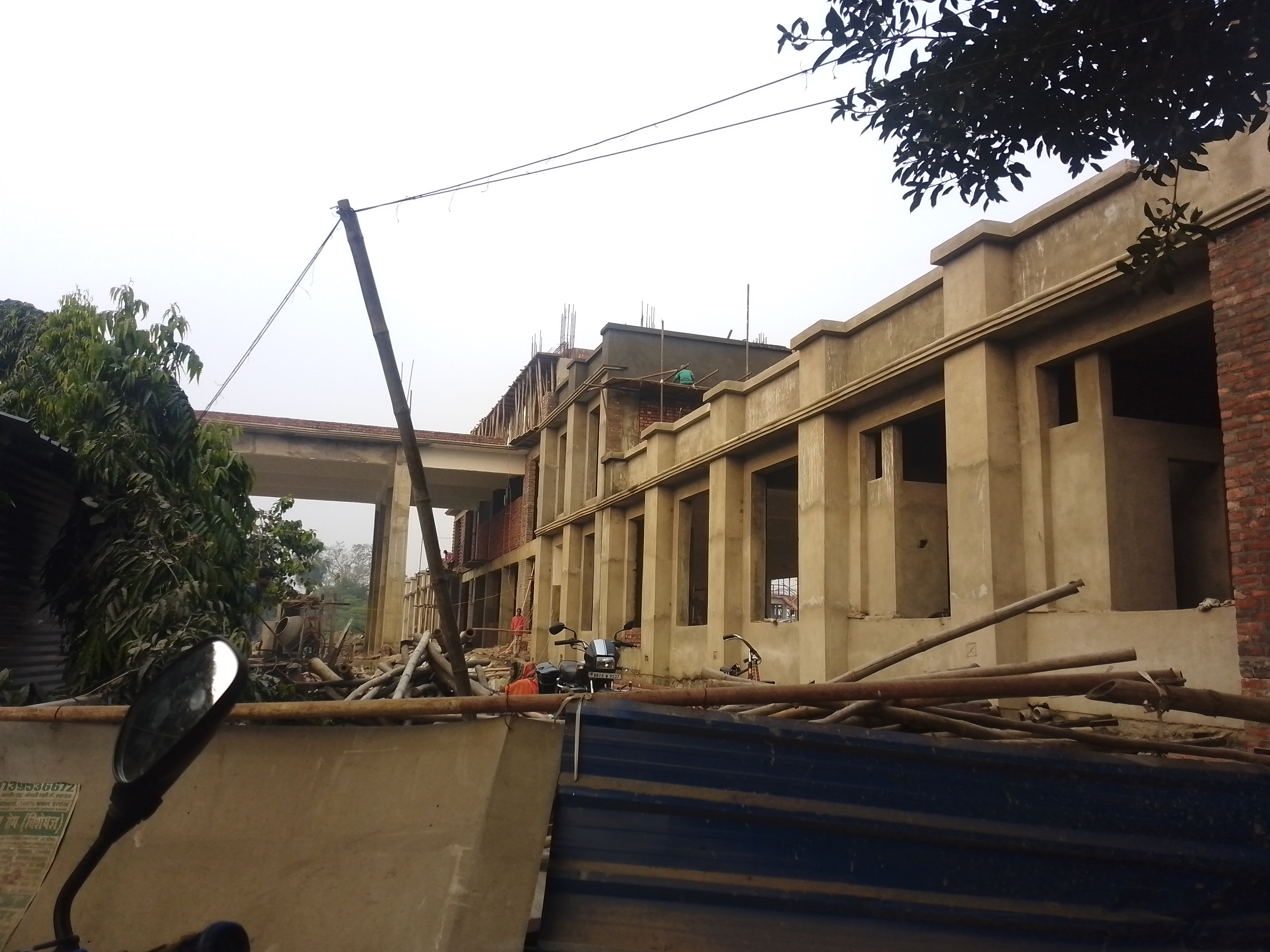
Reconstruction of station under "Amrit Bharat Station Scheme",Dec 2024

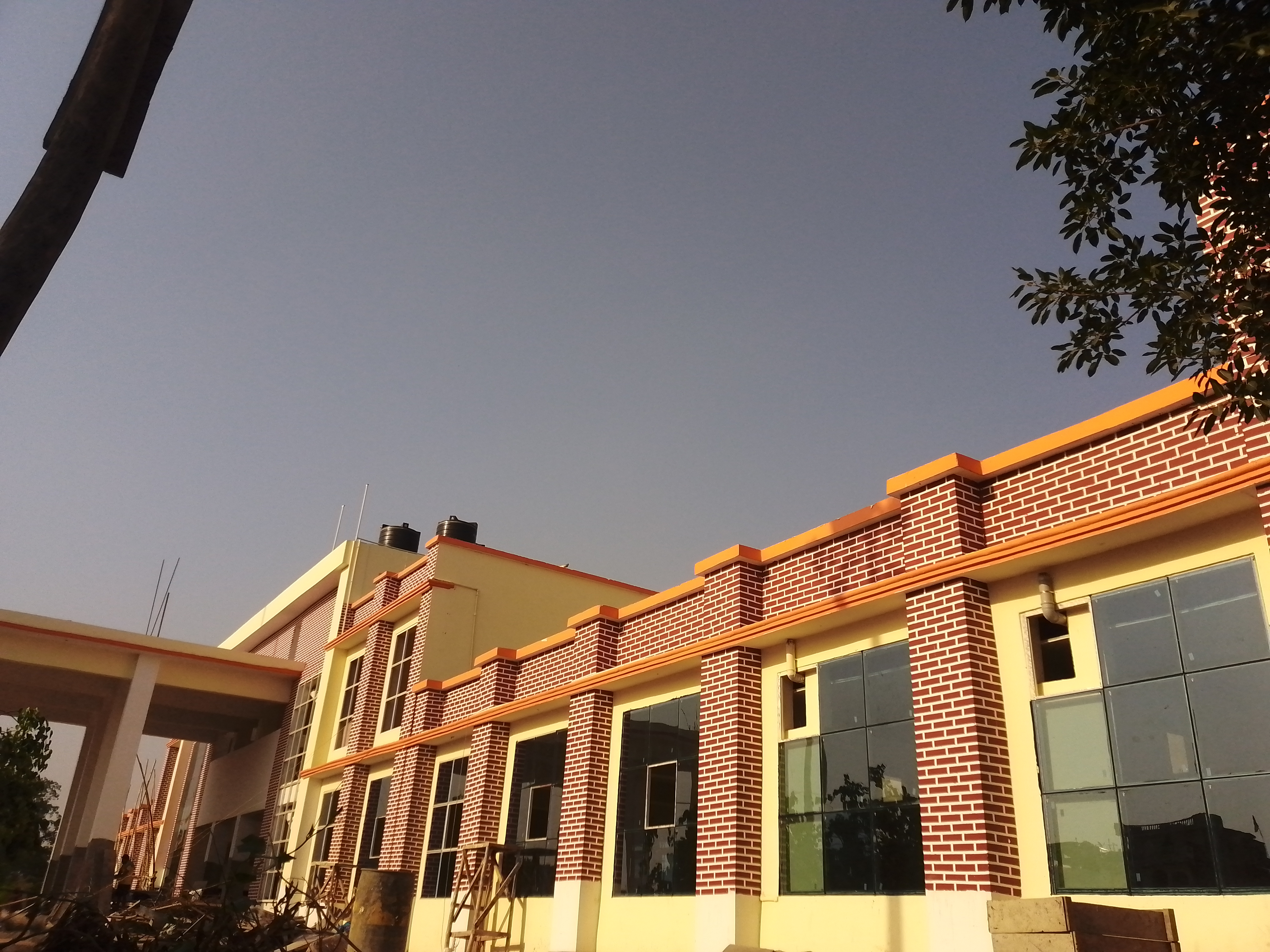
स्टेशन की नई इमारत
