= Sonbarsa Kacheri railway station =

Railway station in Saharsa, Bihar, India

Sonbarsa Kachahari Railway Station

General information
- Location: Sonbarsa Kachahari, Kharagpur, Saharsa district, Bihar - 852202; India
- Coordinates: 25.794°N 86.596°E
- Elevation: 41 metres (135 ft)
- System: Indian Railways station
- Owner: Indian Railways
- Operator: East Central
- Line: Mansi–Saharsa line
- Platforms: 2
- Connections: Regular station for passenger and MEMU trains

Construction
- Structure type: Standard (on-ground station)

Other information
- Status: Operational
- Station code: SBM
- Zone(s): East Central Railway (ECR)
- Division(s): Samastipur
Location
- Location within Bihar Location within India

Sonbarsa Kachahari railway station (station code: SBM) is a railway station located in Sonbarsa Kachahari, in the Saharsa district of Bihar, India. Positioned at an elevation of 41 meters above sea level, the station serves as a halt for several trains running through the region. It has two platforms and falls under the jurisdiction of the East Central Railway, specifically within the Samastipur division. The station is categorized as NSG-5, reflecting its moderate importance. It primarily serves local passengers, connecting them to nearby towns and cities. Despite its role as a halt station, it does not have any originating or terminating trains.

== Major trains ==
- Kosi Express
- Saharsa–Rajendra Nagar Terminal Intercity Express
- 05291-Saharsa–Samastipur Memu special
- 05509-Saharsa- Jamalpur Passenger special
- 05275-Saharsa- Samastipur Memu special
- 05221-Saharsa- Samastipur Demu special
- 05243-Saharsa -Samastipur memu special
- 05549-Saharsa- Samastipur passenger special
- 05277-Saharsa- Samastipur memu special

== See also ==
- Simri Bakhtiyarpur
- Saharsa Junction
- Baba Raghuni Halt Dwarika
