= Chirgaon =

- Town
- Location in Uttar Pradesh, India
- Coordinates: 25°34′N 78°49′E
- Country: India
- State: Uttar Pradesh
- Region: Bundelkhand
- District: Jhansi

Population (2011)
  - Total: 49,977

Languages
  - Official: Hindi and Bundelkhandi
- Time zone: UTC+5:30 (IST)
- PIN: 284301
- Telephone code: 915170-XXXXXX
- Vehicle registration: UP-93
- Sex ratio: 0.908 ♂/♀
- Literacy: 84.86%

Chirgaon is a town and a municipal board in Jhansi district in the Indian state of Uttar Pradesh, India.

Chirgaon is located 30 km away from Jhansi, situated on Jhansi–Kanpur National Highway 27. There is a fort in the middle of the town.

The place is also famous for being the birthplace of poets Maithili Sharan Gupt, his younger brother Siyaram Sharan Munshi and Munshi Ajmeri. Chirgaon was actively involved in Freedom Movement led by Mahatma Gandhi, who had visited Chirgaon on more than one occasion From 1935 to 1945, hundreds of Chirgaon youth joined the movement.

== Demographics ==
As of 2011 India census, Chirgaon has a population of 16,724. It has an average literacy rate of 84.86%, male literacy is 91.95%, and female literacy is 77.10%. Also 12.11% of the population is under six years old.

Scheduled Castes constitute 16.19% of the total population.

== Transport ==
=== Road ===
Chirgaon is well connected by Indian National Highway 27 with Jhansi and Kanpur. It is also connected with Madhya Pradesh by State Highway 45.

=== Railways ===
Chirgaon is served by a station on the Electronic Indian Railways network. Chirgaon railway station (Station Code : CGN) is operated by North Central Railway zone & Jhansi railway division.

Trains that pass through Chirgaon :

To Jhansi Junction

- 51814) Lucknow–Jhansi Passenger (between Lucknow/LKO and Jhansi /JHS)
- 19166 Sabarmati Express (between Darbhanga /DBG and Ahmedabad /ADI)
- 11016 Kushinagar Express (between Gorakhpur /GKP and Lokmanya Tilak Terminus/LTT (Mumbai) )
- 11110 Lucknow–Jhansi InterCity Express (between Lucknow/LKO and Jhansi /JHS )
- 51804 Kanpur–Jhansi Passenger (between and Kanpur Central/CNB and Jhansi /JHS)
- 11123 Gwalior Mail (between Barauni /BJU and Gwalior /GWL)
- 19168 Sabarmati Express (between Varanasi/SBS and Ahmedabad /ADI)

To Kanpur Central

- 51813 Jhansi–Lucknow Passenger (between Jhansi Junction /JHS and Lucknow/LKO)
- 19165 Sabarmati Express (between Ahmedabad /ADI and Darbhanga /DBG)
- 11015 Kushinagar Express (between Lokmanya Tilak Terminus/LTT (Mumbai) and Gorakhpur /GKP)
- 11109 Jhansi–Lucknow Intercity Express (between Jhansi /JHS and Lucknow/LKO)
- 51803 Jhansi–Kanpur Passenger (between Jhansi /JHS and Kanpur Central/CNB)
- 11124 Gwalior Mail (between Gwalior /GWL and Barauni /BJU)
- 19167 Sabarmati Express (between Ahmedabad /ADI and BSB/Varanasi )

For more detail, Please go to https://web.archive.org/web/20140408180437/http://www.indianrail.gov.in/

=== Air ===
The nearest airport from Chirgaon is Gwalior Airport in Gwalior (Madhya Pradesh). Gwalior Airport (IATA Code:GWL, ICAO Code: VIGR), also known as Rajmata Vijyaraje Scindia Vimantal, is about 130 km from Chirgaon. Gwalior is connected to Delhi, Mumbai and Jabalpur regularly by Air India. Gwalior also has a big airforce station. More flights for major destinations like Bangalore, Chennai, Kolkata and Jaipur are expected to start soon.

== Schools ==
Chirgaon has an agricultural college. It has three Inter colleges and 4 high schools and several primary schools in the public service. Main schools in the town are :

- Gyan jyoti Public School.
- Sardar Patel Inter college.
- Saraswati Vidhya Mandir Inter College.
- Saraswati Shishu Mandir.
- Sri Shah Lal Chandra Jain Adarsh Junior High School (Bal Mandir High School)
- Rashtrakavi Maithili Saran Gupt High School.
- C.L.S. Inter College
- B.L.N. Memorial Public School

Despite being in the hinterland and being neglected by the national and state governments, Chirgaon has raised a lot of engineers, doctors & administrators.

== Banks ==
Chirgaon has a branch of State Bank of India (Branch code=7831), a branch of Central Bank of India, a branch of PNB and a branch of Bank of India. There are five automated teller machines of Central Bank of India, State Bank of India, Punjab National Bank, Bank of India, HDFC Bank in the city near bank. Another ATM from Chirgaon is situated at Parichha, 8 km away from Chirgaon and at Moth, about 24 km away from Chirgaon.

== Health care ==
Chirgaon is served by a primary health care center of state government, where a team of general physician and specialist is available for taking care of local and nearby patients. Private practitioners are also there to serve patients.

== Business and industry ==
Chirgaon and nearby areas are mainly dependent on agriculture business. There is no Industry in and around Chirgaon and hence growth of area is also stagnant. Most of the people involved in the agriculture industry are not educated enough so they handle their crops unscientifically and do net get much return on their investment and labors. Chirgaon is not a big industrial area.

Chirgaon and surrounding area are highly neglected by Central and State government for any development initiative in the field of business or industrial growth of area.
