= Meerut City–Lucknow Rajya Rani Express =

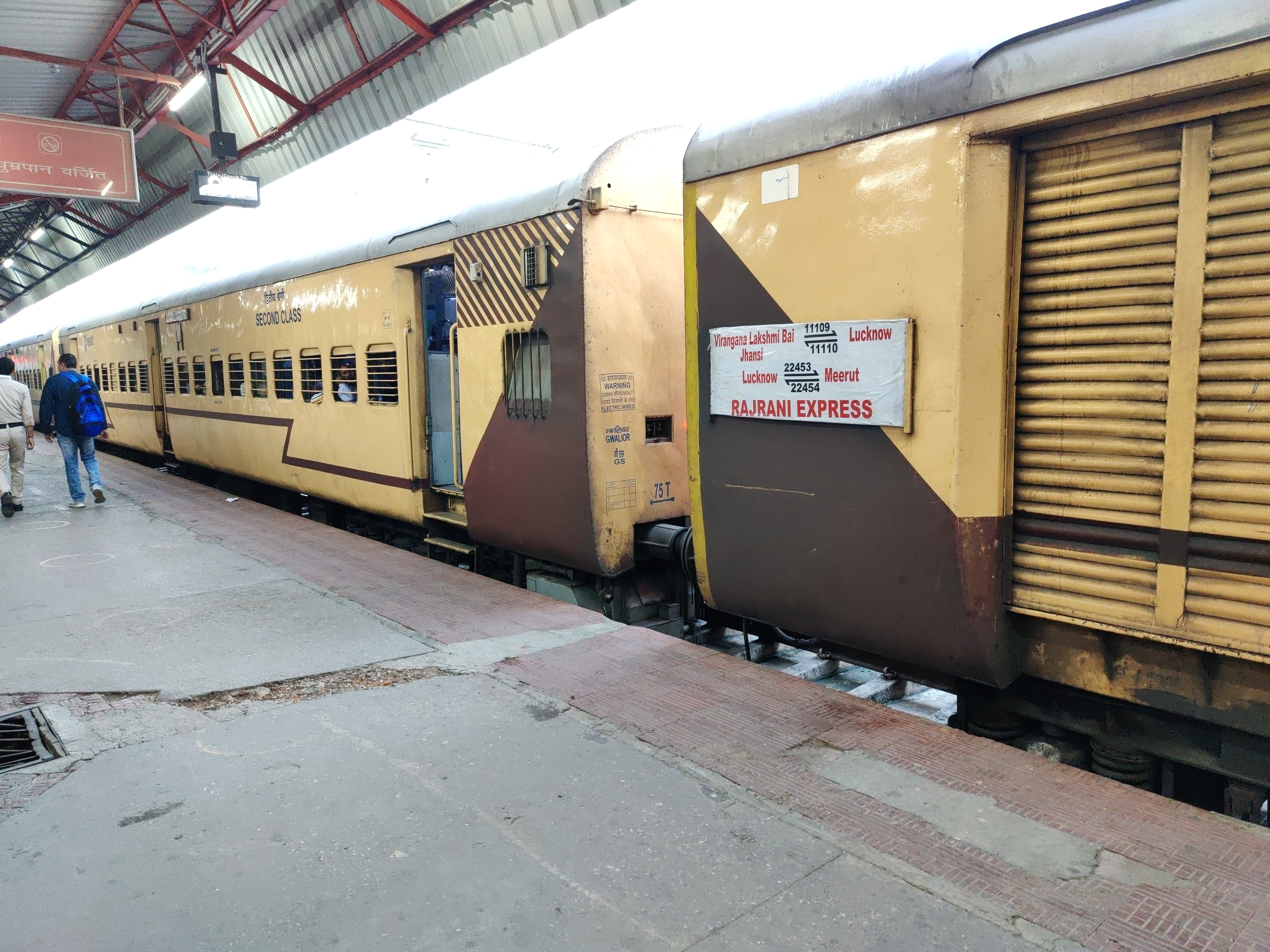
- Meerut-Lucknow Rajya Rani Express at Meerut City

Overview
- Service type: Rajya Rani Express
- First service: March 11, 2012; 14 years ago
- Current operator: North Central Railways

Route
- Termini: Meerut City Junction (MTC); Lucknow Junction (LJN)
- Stops: 8
- Distance travelled: 459 km (285 mi)
- Average journey time: 8 hours 05 minutes
- Service frequency: Daily
- Train number: 22454 / 22453

On-board services
- Classes: AC 2 Tier, AC 3 Tier, AC Chair Car, 2nd Class Seating, General Unreserved
- Seating arrangements: Yes
- Sleeping arrangements: No
- Catering facilities: On-board Catering; E-Catering
- Other facilities: Below the seats

Technical
- Rolling stock: ICF coach
- Track gauge: 1,676 mm (5 ft 6 in)
- Electrification: yes
- Operating speed: 110 km/h (68 mph) maximum, 57.68 km/h (36 mph) average including halts
Route map
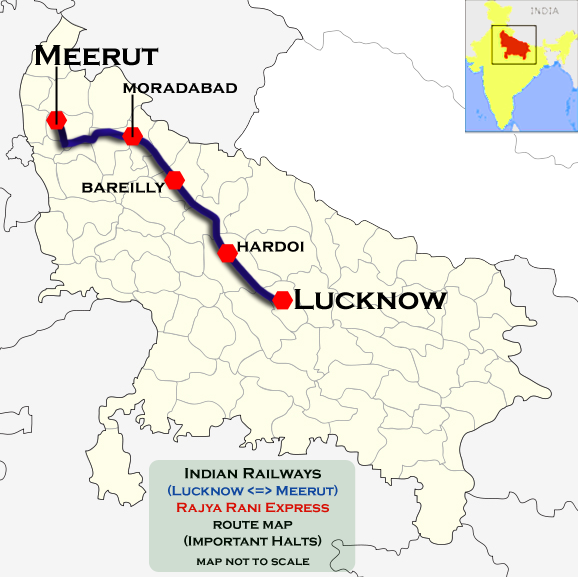

The 22454 / 22453 Meerut City–Lucknow Rajya Rani Express is a Superfast Express train of the Rajya Rani Express series belonging to Indian Railways – North Central Railway zone that runs between Meerut City and Lucknow NE in India.

It operates as train number 22454 from Meerut to Lucknow NE and as train number 22453 in the reverse direction serving the state of Uttar Pradesh.

It is part of the Rajya Rani Express series launched by the former railway minister of India, Ms. Mamata Banerjee in the 2011/12 Rail Budget .

== Coaches ==
The 22454 / 53 Meerut City–Lucknow Rajya Rani Express has 1 AC Two Tier, 2 AC 3 Tier, 2 AC Chair Car, 7 Second Class seating, 2 General Unreserved and 2 SLR (Seating cum Luggage Rake) coaches. It does not carry a pantry car.

As is customary with most train services in India, coach composition may be amended at the discretion of Indian Railways depending on demand.

=== Rake sharing ===
The 22454 / 53 Meerut City–Lucknow Rajya Rani Express shares its rake with 11109 / 10 Jhansi–Lucknow Intercity Express.

== Service ==
The 22454 Meerut City Lucknow Rajya Rani Express covers the distance of 459 km (285 mi) in 8 hours 05 mins (56.78 km/h) and in 7 hours 50 mins as 22453 Lucknow Meerut City Rajya Rani Express (58.60 km/h).

As the average speed of the train is above 55 km/h (34 mph), as per Indian Railways rules, its fare includes a Superfast surcharge.

== Routeing ==
The 22454/22453 Meerut City–Lucknow Rajya Rani Express runs from Meerut City Junction via Hapur Junction, Amroha, Moradabad Junction, Rampur Junction, Bareilly Junction, Shahjahanpur, Hardoi to Lucknow Junction.

== Traction ==
Earlier was WDP-4. As the route is now fully doubled and electrified, a Kanpur / Jhansi-based WAP-4 hauls the train for its entire journey.

== Operation ==
- 22454 Meerut City–Lucknow Rajya Rani Express runs from Meerut City on a daily basis arriving at Lucknow NE the same day..
- 22453 Lucknow–Meerut City Rajya Rani Express runs from Lucknow NE on a daily basis arriving in Meerut the same day.

== Accidents ==
=== 2017 ===
Eight coaches of the Meerut–Lucknow Rajya Rani Express derailed at 8:15 AM on 15 April 2017, between Rampur and Mundapanda near a bridge over the Koshi river. A total of 13 passengers were injured. Three of the derailed coaches overturned while seven went off the tracks. Railway Minister Suresh Prabhu ordered an inquiry into the cause of accident. He also announced a compensation of ₹50,000 for the passengers injured in the derailment. A compensation of ₹50,000 and ₹25,000 for passengers with serious and minor injuries respectively was announced by UP Chief Minister Yogi Adityanath.
