= Bandra Terminus–Saharsa Humsafar Express =

Bandra Terminus - Saharsa Humsafar Express
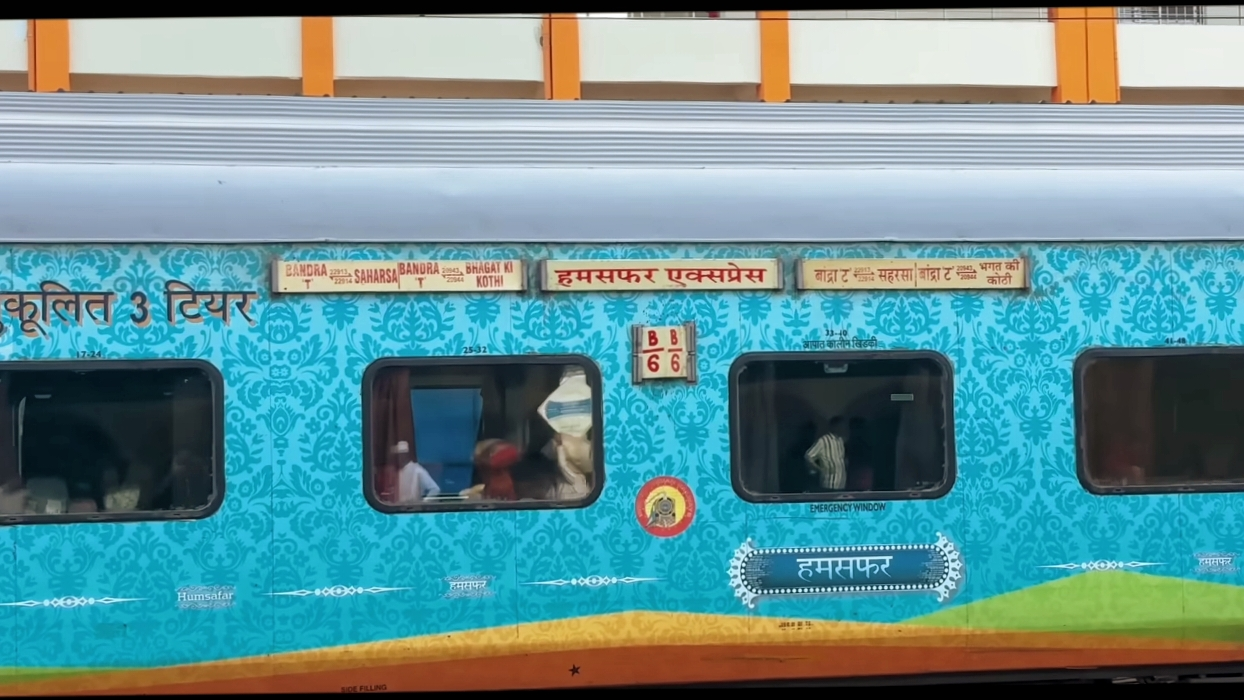
- Bandra Terminus - Saharsa Humsafar Express At Itarsi Junction railway station

Overview
- Service type: Humsafar Express
- First service: 13 August 2017; 8 years ago
- Current operator: Western Railways

Route
- Termini: Bandra Terminus (BDTS); Saharsa Junction (SHC)
- Stops: 14
- Distance travelled: 2,060 km (1,280 mi)
- Average journey time: 39h 00m
- Service frequency: Weekly (Note: Runs once in a week for every direction.)
- Train number: 22913 / 22914

On-board services
- Class: AC 3 tier
- Seating arrangements: Yes
- Sleeping arrangements: Yes
- Catering facilities: Available
- Observation facilities: Large windows

Technical
- Rolling stock: LHB Humsafar
- Track gauge: 1,676 mm (5 ft 6 in)
- Operating speed: 55 km/h (34 mph)

The 22913 / 22914 Bandra Terminus - Saharsa Humsafar Express is an Humsafar Express train belonging to Western Railway zone that runs between Bandra Terminus and Saharsa Junction. It is currently being operated with 22913/22914 train numbers on a weekly basis. This train was previously running only up to Patna Junction but recently this train has been extended up to Saharsa Junction by the Ministry of Railways.

== Coach composition ==
The trains is 3-tier AC sleeper trains designed by Indian Railways with features of LED screen display to show information about stations, train speed etc. and will have announcement system as well, Vending machines for tea, coffee and milk, Bio toilets in compartments as well as CCTV cameras. The train also contains Non-AC Sleeper Class coaches.

== Service ==
The 22913/Bandra Terminus - Saharsa Humsafar Express has an average speed of 55 km/h, and covers 2060 km in 39h 00m.

The 22914/Saharsa - Bandra Terminus Humsafar Express has an average speed of 57 km/h, and covers 2060 km in 38h 50m.

== Route and halts ==
- Bandra Terminus
- Vapi
- Valsad
- Bhestan
- Nandurbar
- Bhusaval Junction
- Itarsi Junction
- Jabalpur Junction
- Katni Junction
- Satna
- Allahabad Chheoki Junction
- Pt. DD Upadhyaya Jn. (Mughalsarai)
- Patna Junction
- New Barauni Junction
- Begusarai
- Khagaria Junction
- Saharsa Junction

== Traction ==
Both trains are hauled by a Vadodara Electric Loco Shed based WAP 7 locomotive from end to end

== See also ==
- Humsafar Express
- Bandra Terminus railway station
- Saharsa Junction railway station
