= Jan Nayak Express =

Train in India

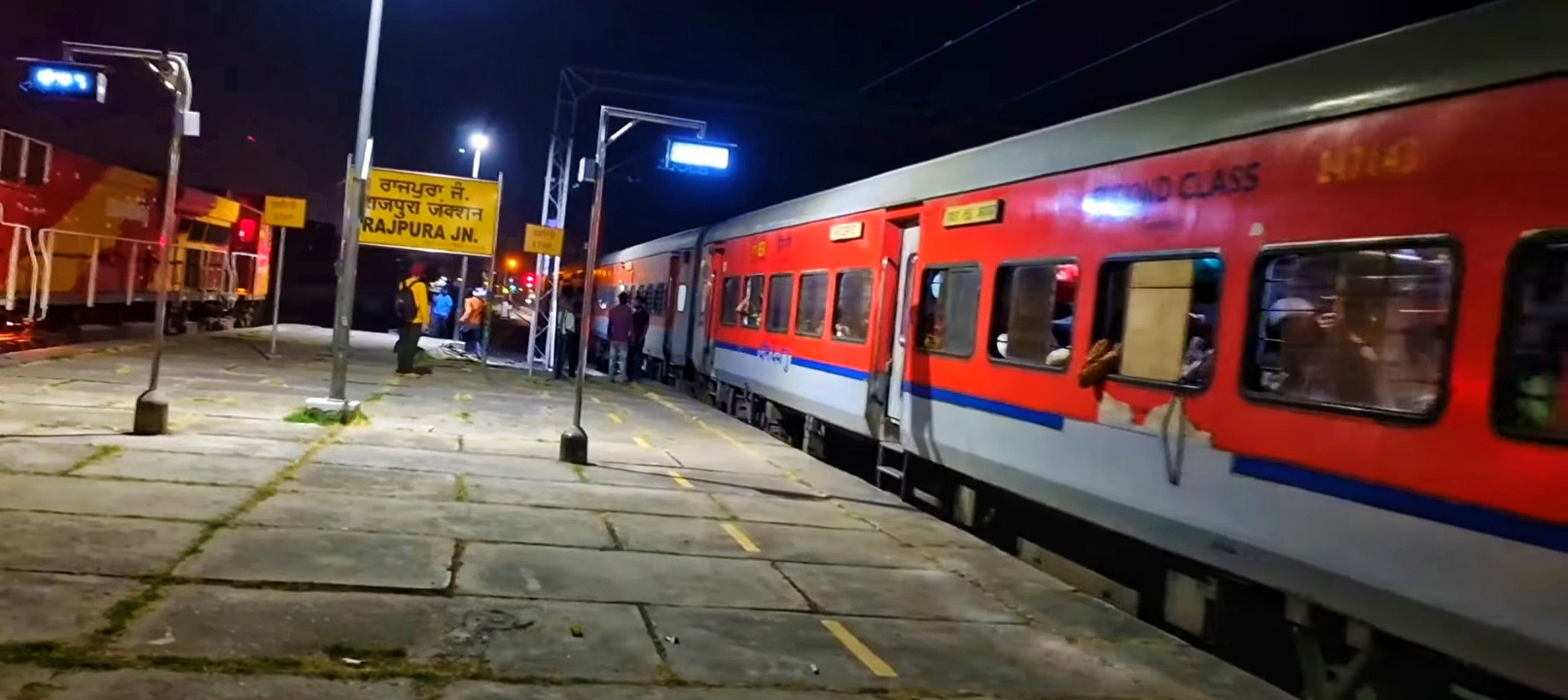
- Jan Nayak Express At Rajpura Junction

Overview
- Service type: Express
- First service: 12 December 2009; 16 years ago
- Current operator: East Central Railway

Route
- Termini: Darbhanga (DBG); Amritsar (ASR)
- Stops: 41
- Distance travelled: 1,486 km (923 mi)
- Average journey time: 32 hrs 25 mins
- Service frequency: Daily (Note: Runs seven days in a week for every direction.)
- Train number: 15211 / 15212

On-board services
- Class: General Unreserved
- Seating arrangements: Yes
- Sleeping arrangements: Yes
- Catering facilities: Not available
- Observation facilities: Large windows
- Baggage facilities: No
- Other facilities: Below the seats

Technical
- Rolling stock: LHB coach
- Track gauge: 1,676 mm (5 ft 6 in)
- Operating speed: 46 km/h (29 mph) average including halts.

The 15211 / 15212 Jan Nayak Express is an express train belonging to East Central Railway zone that runs between Darbhanga Junction and Amritsar Junction in India. It is currently being operated with 15211/15212 train numbers on a daily basis.

This train is named after and in honour of Karpoori Thakur (Jan Nayak), a freedom fighter and former Chief Minister of Bihar state.

== Service ==
The 15211/Jan Nayak Express has an average speed of 46 km/h and covers 1486 km in 32h 25m. The 15212/Jan Nayak Express has an average speed of 47 km/h and covers 1486 km in 31h 55m.

== Route & Halts ==
The important halts of the train are:

- Darbhanga Junction
- Laheriasarai
- Samastipur Junction
- Muzaffarpur Junction
- Bapudham Motihari
- Bettiah
- Narkatiaganj Junction
- Kaptanganj Junction
- Gorakhpur Junction
- Basti
- Gonda Junction
- Sitapur Cantonment
- Sitapur City Junction
- Bareilly Junction
- Moradabad Junction
- Najibabad Junction
- Laksar Junction
- Saharanpur Junction
- Ambala Cantonment Junction
- Ludhiana Junction
- Jalandhar Cantonment Junction
- Jalandhar City Junction
- Beas Junction
- Amritsar Junction

== Coach composition ==
The train has LHB rakes with a maximum speed of 130 km/h. The train consists of 22 coaches:

- 20 General Unreserved
- 2 Seating cum Luggage Rake

== Traction ==
Both trains are hauled by a Ghaziabad Loco Shed-based WAP-5 / WAP-7 electric locomotive from Darbhanga to Amritsar and vice versa.

== Direction reversal ==
The train reverses its direction thrice:

- Samastipur Junction

== See also ==
- Darbhanga Junction railway station
- Amritsar Junction railway station
- Saharsa–Barauni Express
