= Saharsa Junction railway station =

Railway station in Saharsa, Bihar, India

SAHARSA JUNCTION

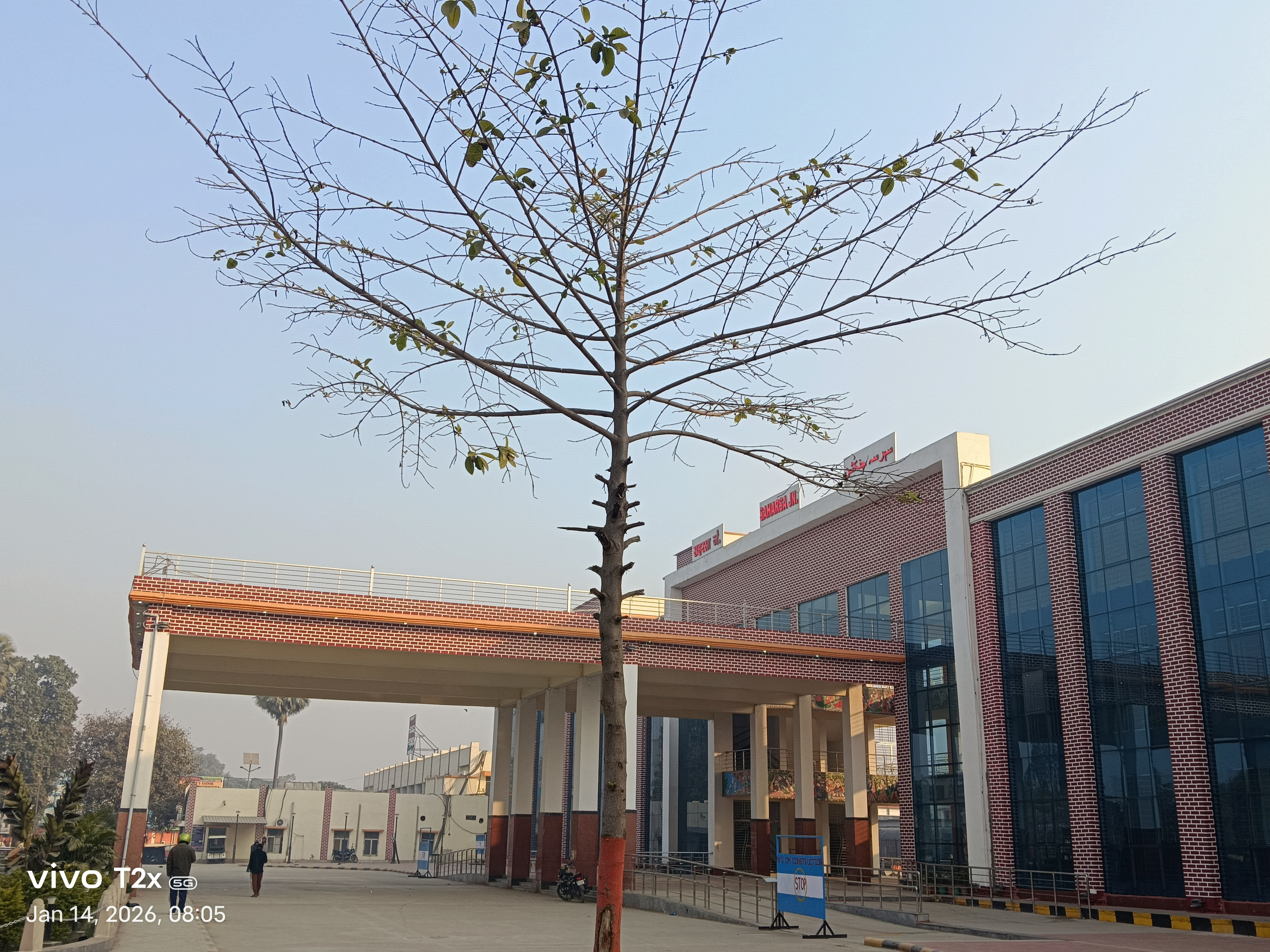
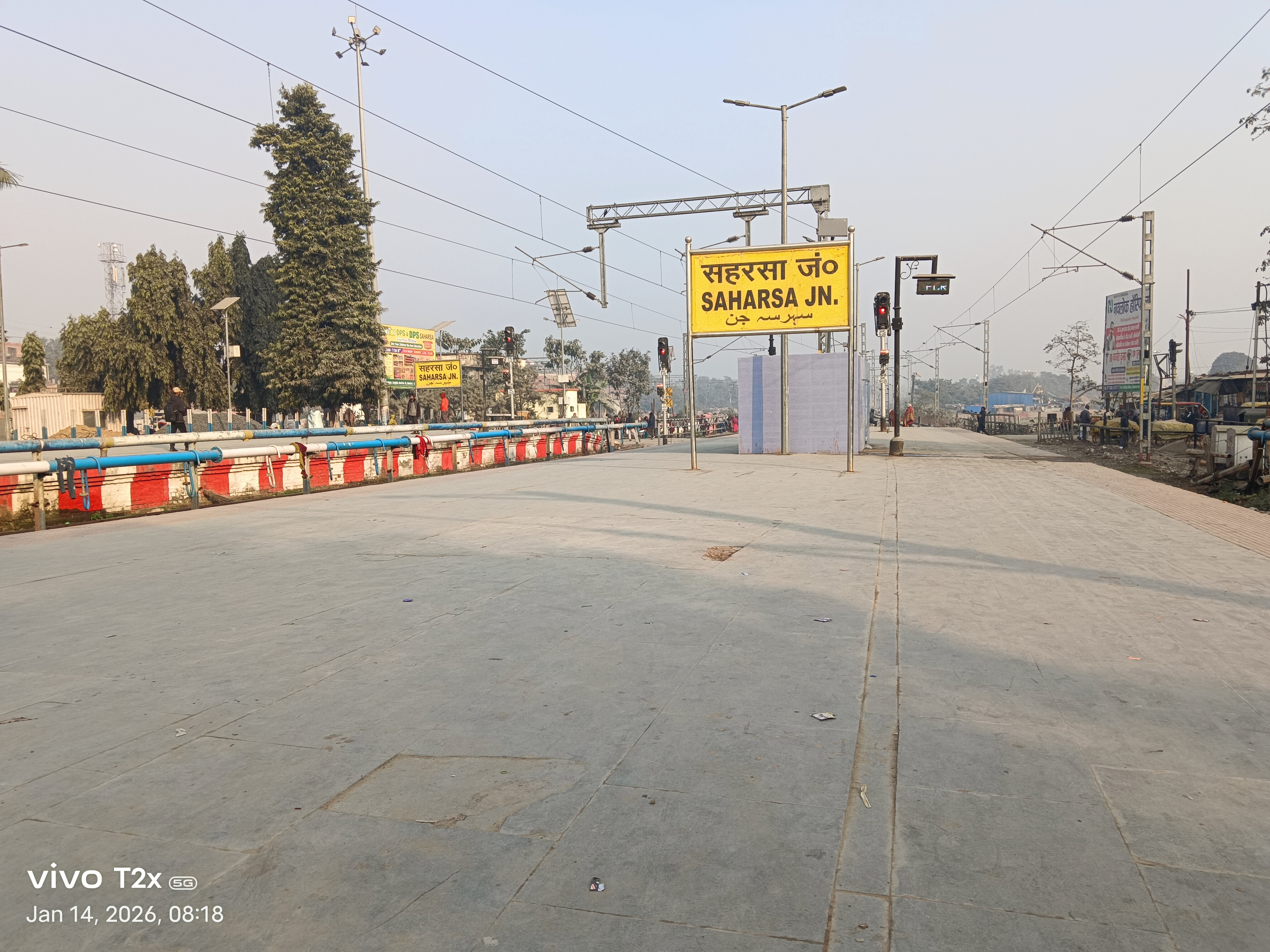
- Picture of New Building of Saharsa Junction

General information
- Location: Railway Station Marg, Ward Number 30, Jay Prabha Nagar, Saharsa, Bihar 852201; India
- Elevation: 46 metres (151 ft)
- System: Indian Railways station
- Owner: Indian Railways
- Operator: East Central
- Lines: Mansi–Saharsa line; Saharsa–Purnia line; Saharsa–Forbesganj line
- Platforms: 5
- Tracks: 7
- Connections: All over India

Construction
- Structure type: At-grade
- Parking: Yes
- Cycle facilities: Yes

Other information
- Status: Functioning
- Station code: SHC
- Zone(s): East Central Railway Zone
- Division(s): Samastipur
- Website: www.irctc.co.in/nget/train-search

History
- Opened: 1887
- Former names: Saharsa Junction

Passengers
- 150,000+ per day

Services
Preceding station	Indian Railways	Following station
East Central Railway zone
Terminus	Barauni–Katihar section Towards Forbesganj	Saharsa Katcheri towards Barauni Junction
Khagaria Junction towards Katihar Junction	Barauni–Katihar section Towards Purnia	Dauram Madhepura towards Barauni Junction
Route map
Location
- Location within India Location within Bihar
- Interactive map of Saharsa Junction

Saharsa Junction railway station (station code: SHC) is a main railway station in Saharsa district, of the Indian state of Bihar. It serves Kosi Division area. The station consists of 5 platforms.This railway junction has been certified by ISO:14001:2015 for environmental management. Due to less railway facility, less expansion of rail network in Supaul and Madhepura district's people used to catch trains from Saharsa instead of their own stations. It is the main railway junction of Kosi division.

== Redevlopment ==
As part of Indian Railways’ modernization efforts and schemes such as Amrit Bharat Station Scheme and PM Gati Shakti, Saharsa Junction is undergoing extensive upgrades to enhance capacity, passenger amenities, and freight handling.

=== Yard Remodeling & New Platforms ===
Originally proposed at ₹194 crore, the yard remodeling project was revised and approved by the Railway Board at ₹158.73 crore.

== Connectivity ==
Saharsa connected to the major cities in India like Patna, Muzaffarpur, Munger, Delhi, Kolkata Mumbai, Surat, Ranchi, Kanpur, Prayag Raj, Lucknow, Amritsar many other cities by the railway network and serves the city with numerous trains. India's first Garib Rath has started from here which was 12203 Saharsa–Amritsar Garib Rath. It is also the originating junction of premium train such as Humsafar Express, Garib Rath Express, Rajya Rani Express, Superfast Express, and many Express train.

== Facilities ==
The major facilities available are waiting rooms, retiring room, computerized reservation facility, reservation counter, vehicle parking etc.

There are refreshment rooms vegetarian and non vegetarian, tea stall, book stall, post and telegraphic office and Government Railway police office.

== Image ==
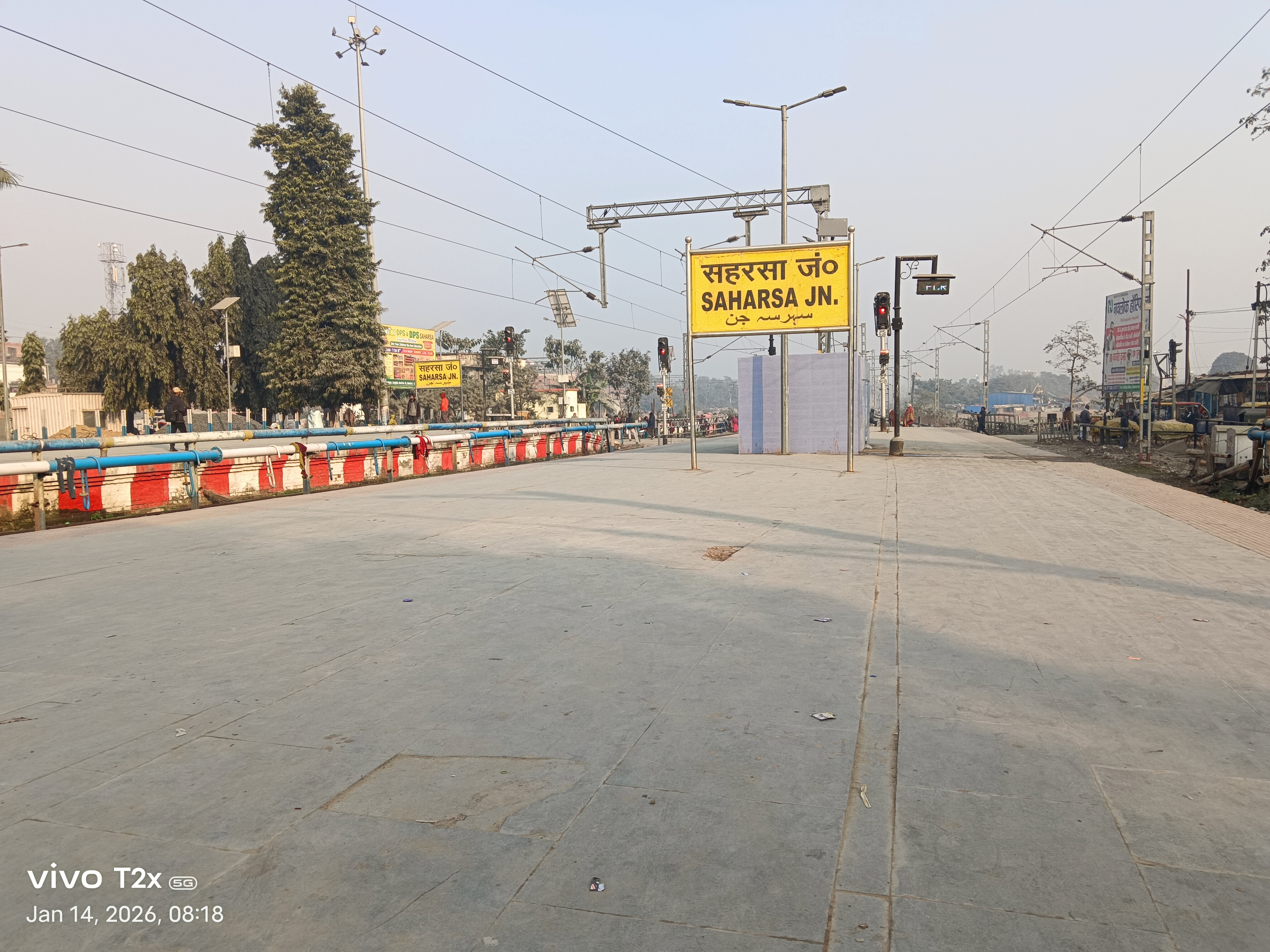
Saharsa junction nameplate

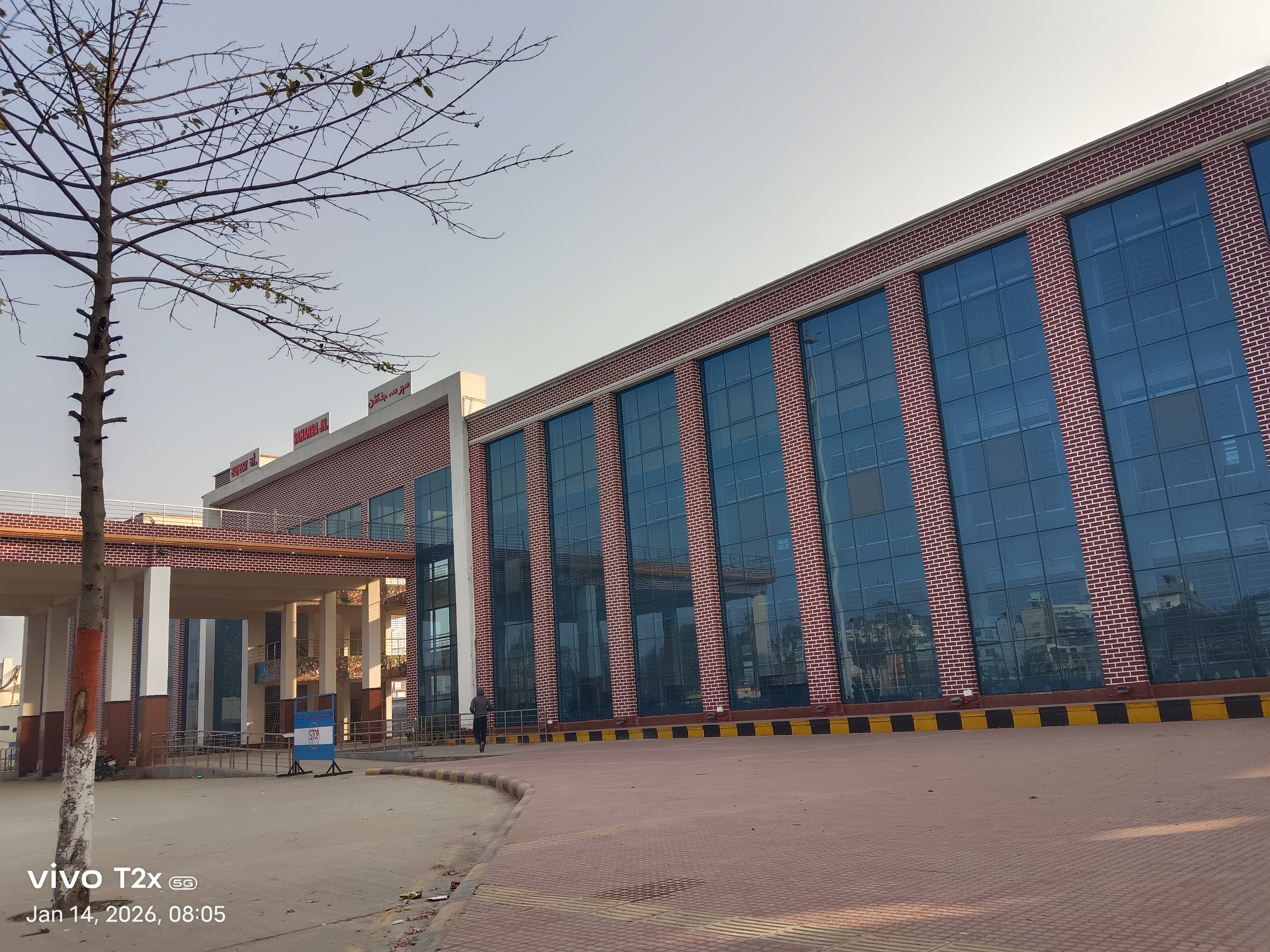
Saharsa junction close view

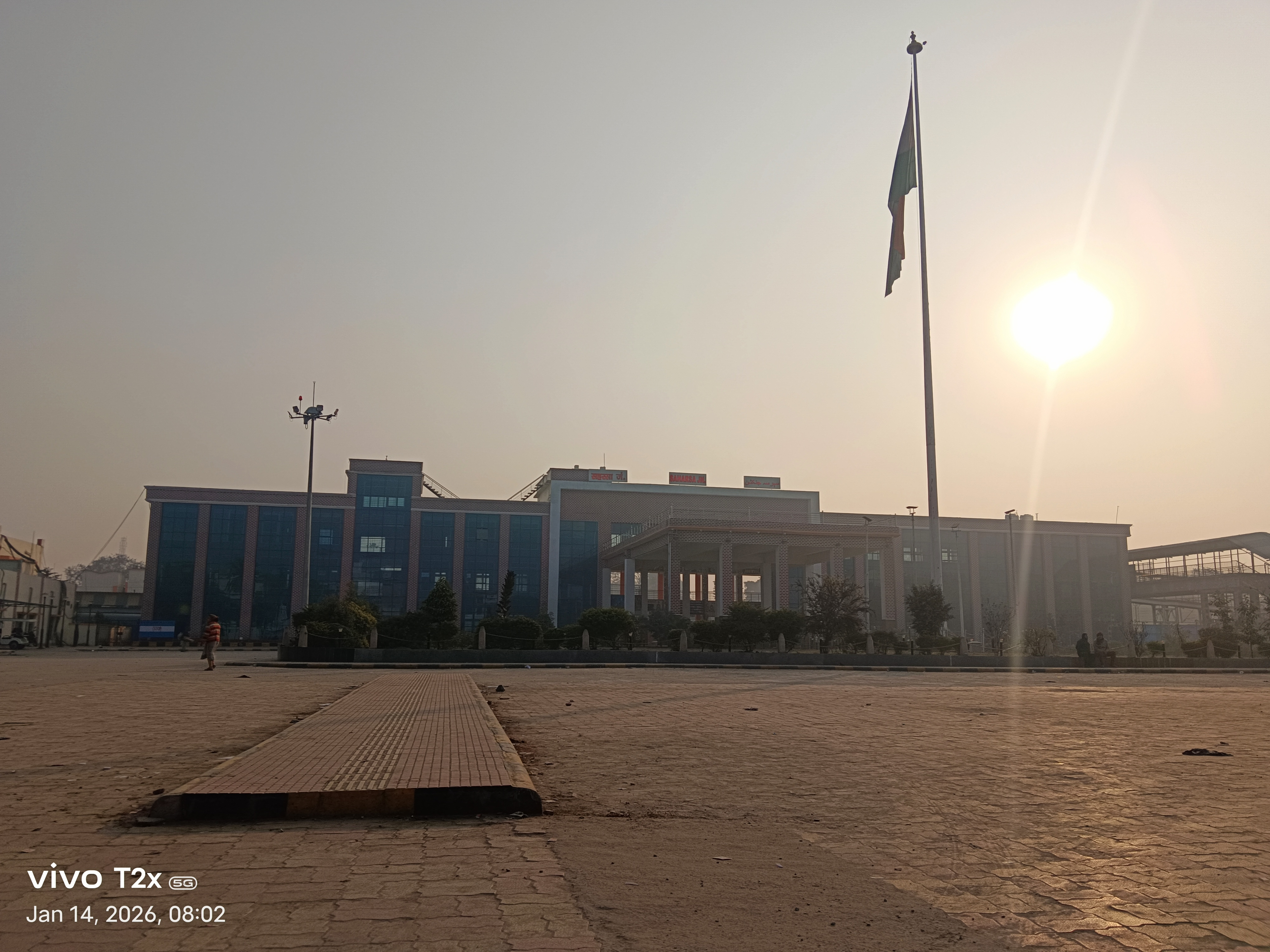
Saharsa junction front view

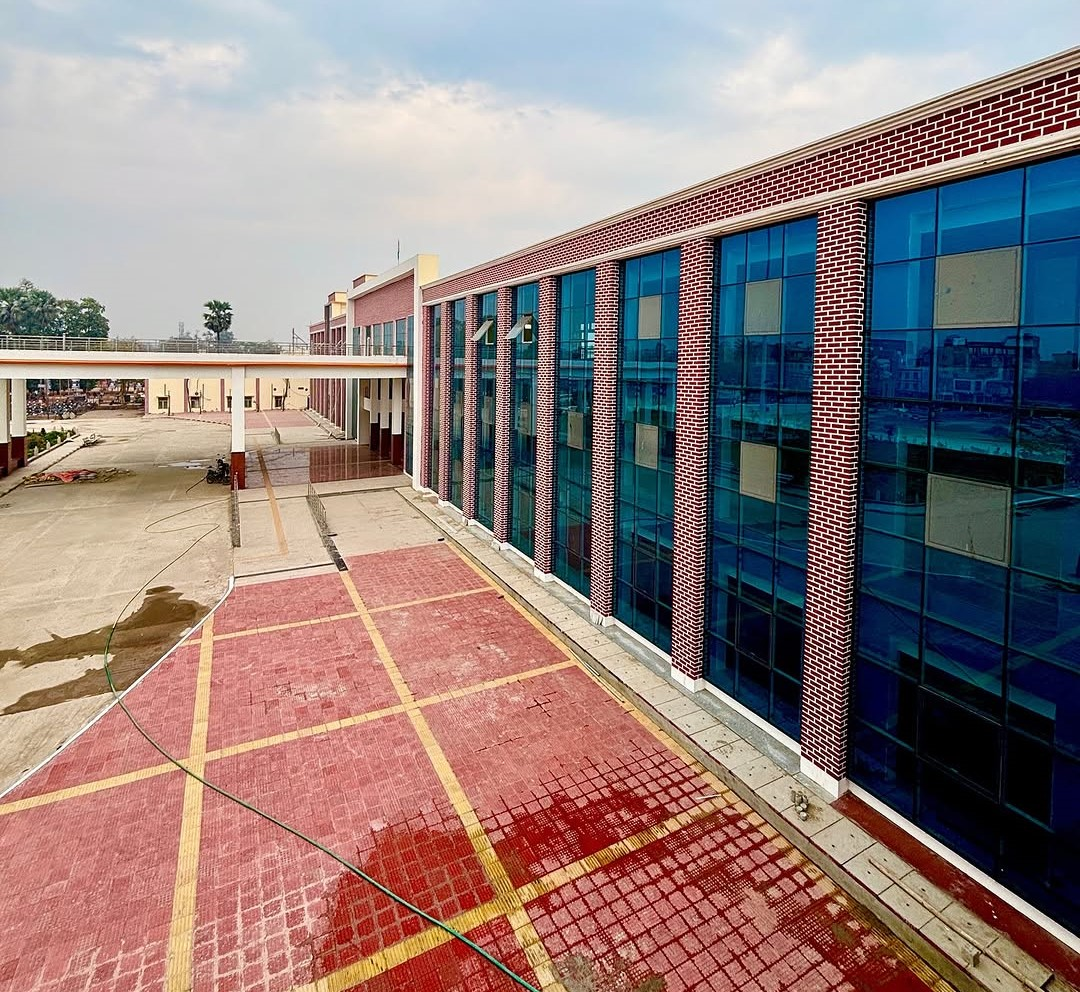
Saharsa junction new building close view

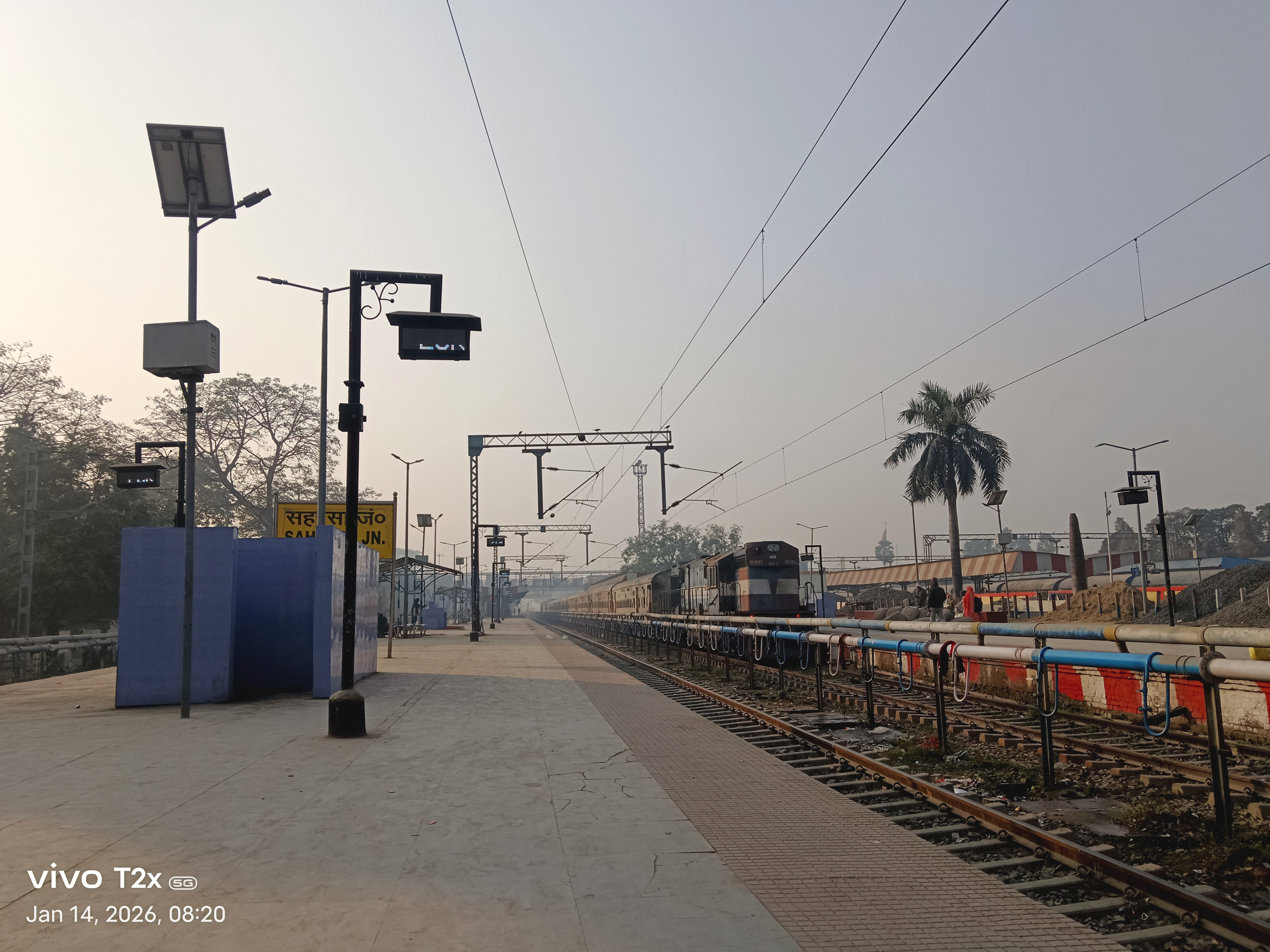
Saharsa junction platform number 3 and 4

== Major trains ==
- Jogbani–Danapur Vande Bharat Express
- Bandra Terminus–Saharsa Humsafar Express
- Vaishali Express
- Saharsa–Amritsar Garib Rath Express
- Saharsa–Patna Rajya Rani Express
- Poorbiya Express
- Janhit Express
- Hate Bazare Express
- Hate Bazare Express (via Purnea)
- Saharsa–Amritsar Jan Sadharan Express (via Chandigarh)
- Purnia Court–Amritsar Jan Sewa Express
- Saharsa–Barauni Express
- Janaki Intercity Express
- Saharsa–Anand Vihar Terminal Jan Sadharan Express
- Saharsa–Amritsar Jan Sadharan Express (via Sirhind)
- Kosi Express
- Saharsa–Rajendra Nagar Terminal Intercity Express
- Saharsa–Samastipur Passenger
- Saharsa–Purnia Passenger
- (05543) Laheriyasarai - Saharsha DMU
- (05544) Saharsha - Laheriyasarai DMU
- (05546) Saharsha - Laheriyasarai DMU
- (05547) Laheriyasarai - Saharsha DMU
- (05548) Saharsha - Laheriyasarai DMU
- 05549) Laheriyasarai - Saharsha DMU
