= Jhansi–Lucknow Intercity Express =

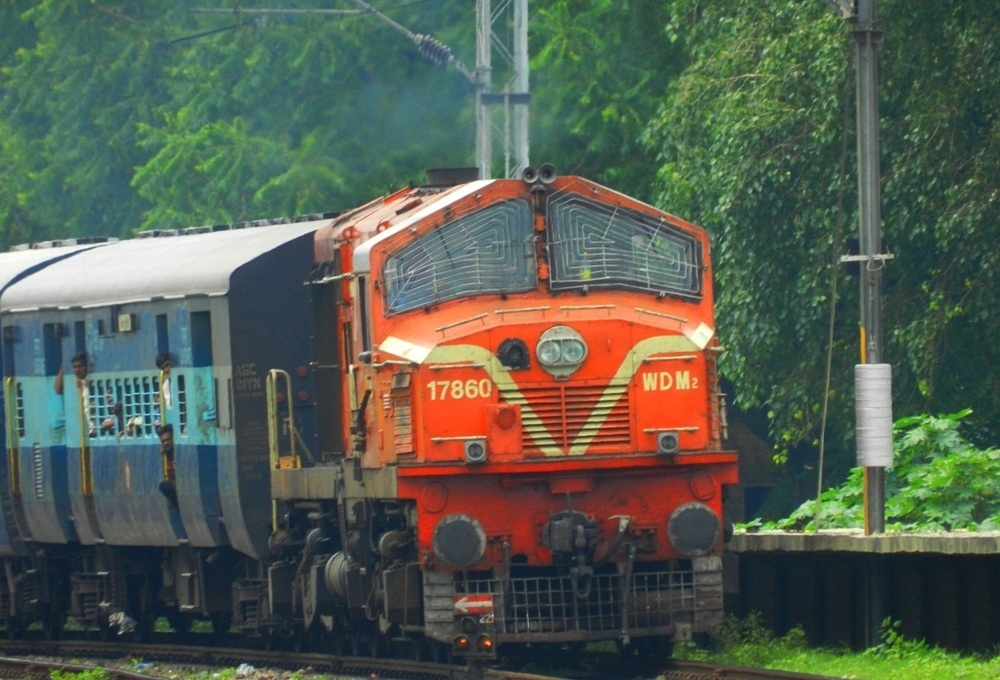
- Jhansi–Lucknow Intercity Express at Lucknow

Overview
- Service type: Intercity Express
- Current operator: North Central Railway

Route
- Termini: Jhansi Junction; Lucknow NE
- Stops: 9
- Distance travelled: 294 km (183 mi)
- Average journey time: 5 hours 55 mins as 11109 Jhansi–Lucknow Intercity Express, 5 hours 50 mins as 11110 Lucknow–Jhansi Intercity Express.
- Service frequency: Daily
- Train number: 11109 / 10

On-board services
- Classes: AC 2 Tier, AC 3 Tier, AC Chair Car, Second Class seating, General Unreserved
- Seating arrangements: Yes
- Sleeping arrangements: No
- Catering facilities: No
- Observation facilities: Operated from Lucknow NR until 1 March 2014 .

Technical
- Rolling stock: Standard Indian Railways coaches
- Track gauge: 1,676 mm (5 ft 6 in)
- Operating speed: 110 km/h (68 mph) maximum 50.04 km/h (31 mph) including halts.

The 11109 / 10 Jhansi–Lucknow Intercity Express is an Express train belonging to Indian Railways – North Central Railways that runs between Jhansi Junction and Lucknow NE in India.

It operates as train number 11109 from Jhansi Junction to Lucknow NE and as train number 11110 in the reverse direction serving the state of Uttar Pradesh .

== Coaches ==
The 11109 / 10 Jhansi–Lucknow Intercity Express has 1 AC 2 Tier, 2 AC 3 Tier, 2 AC Chair Car, 7 Second Class seating, 2 General Unreserved and 2 SLR (Seating cum Luggage Rake) Coaches. It does not carry a pantry car.

As is customary with most train services in India, coach composition may be amended at the discretion of Indian Railways depending on demand.

== Service ==
The 11109 Jhansi–Lucknow Intercity Express covers the distance of 294 km (183 mi) in 5 hours 55 mins (49.69 km/h) and in 5 hours 50 mins as 11110 Lucknow–Jhansi Intercity Express (50.40 km/h) .

As the average speed of the train is below 55 km/h (34 mph), as per Indian Railways rules, its fare does not include a Superfast surcharge.

== Routeing ==
The 11109 / 10 Jhansi–Lucknow Intercity Express runs from Jhansi Junction via Moth, Orai, Pukhrayan, Kanpur Central to Lucknow NE .

== Traction ==
As the route is fully electrified, a Jhansi-based WAP-4 is the traditional power for this train and hauls the train for its entire journey .

== Rake Sharing ==
The 11109 / 10 Jhansi–Lucknow Intercity Express shares its rake with the 22453 / 54 Meerut City–Lucknow Rajya Rani Express.

== Operation ==
- 11109 Jhansi–Lucknow Intercity Express runs from Jhansi Junctio} on a daily basis reaching Lucknow NE the same day .
- 11110 Lucknow–Jhansi Intercity Express runs from Lucknow NE on a daily basis reaching Jhansi Junction the same day .
