= Shalimar–Adra Rajya Rani Express =

Train in India

Rajya Rani Express
Overview
- Service type: Rajya Rani Express
- First service: 3 October 2011; 14 years ago
- Last service: 2020
- Current operator: South Eastern Railways

Route
- Termini: Shalimar (SHM); Adra (ADRA)
- Stops: 8
- Distance travelled: 281 km (175 mi)
- Average journey time: 5 hours 5 mins
- Service frequency: Daily
- Train number: 22861 / 22862

On-board services
- Class: General Unreserved
- Seating arrangements: Yes
- Sleeping arrangements: No
- Catering facilities: No
- Other facilities: Below the seats

Technical
- Rolling stock: ICF coach
- Track gauge: 1,676 mm (5 ft 6 in)
- Operating speed: 58 km/h (36 mph) average including halts
Route map
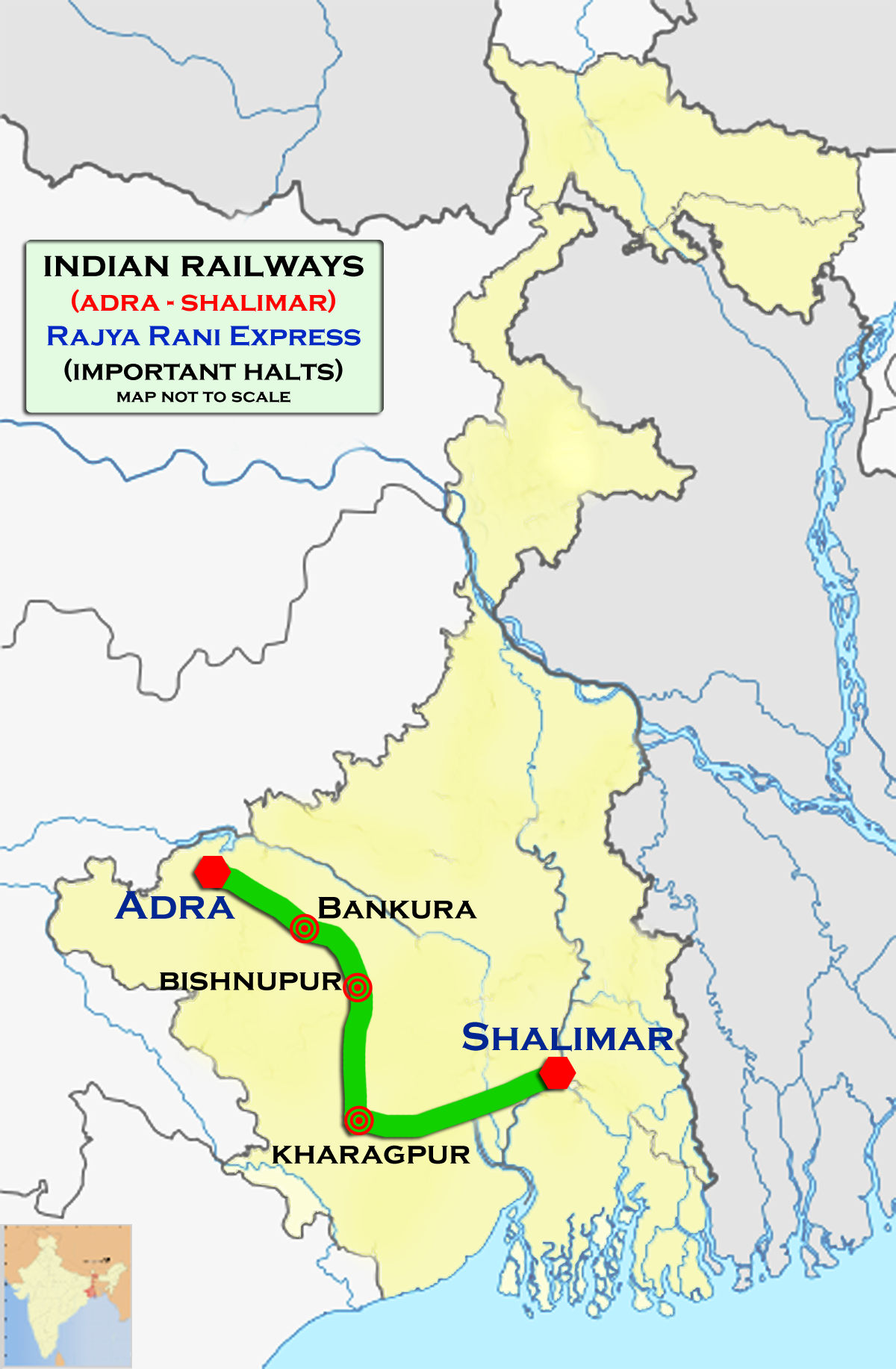

The 22861 / 22862 Rajya Rani Express was an Express train belonging to Indian Railways South Eastern Railway zone that ran between Shalimar and Adra Junction in India.This train was a part of Rajya Rani Express series from West Bengal state. The train was permanently cancelled in 2020, and the train numbers were allotted to Howrah - Kantabanji Ispat express.

It operated as train number 22861 from Shalimar to Adra Junction and as train number 22862 in the reverse direction, serving the states of West Bengal.

== Coaches ==
The 22861 / 62 Rajya Rani Express had eight general unreserved & two SLR (seating with luggage rake) coaches. It did not carry a pantry car.

== Service ==
The 22861 Shalimar–Adra Junction Rajya Rani Express covered the distance of 281 km (175 mi) in 4 hours 45 mins (59 km/h) and in 5 hours 10 mins as the 22862 Adra Junction–Shalimar Rajya Rani Express (54 km/h).

As the average speed of the train was more than 55 km/h (34 mph), as per railway rules, it should have included a Superfast surcharge but due to its unreserved coaches, it included an unreserved surcharge.

== Routing ==
The train ran from Shalimar via Santragachi Junction, Kharagpur Junction, Salboni, Bishnupur, Bankura Junction to Adra Junction.

== Traction ==
As the route is electrified, a Santragachi-based WAP-4 / WAP-7 electric locomotive pulled the train to its destination.
