= Rajya Rani Superfast Express =

Train in India

Saharsa – Patna Rajya Rani Express

Overview
- Service type: Rajya Rani Express
- First service: March 18, 2012; 14 years ago
- Current operator: East Central Railway Primary maintenance Saharsa coaching depot

Route
- Termini: Lalitgram (LLP); Patna Junction (PNBE)
- Stops: 7
- Distance travelled: 214 km (133 mi)
- Average journey time: 4 hrs 5 mins
- Service frequency: Daily
- Train number: 15509/15510/15503 /15504

On-board services
- Classes: AC 3 Tier Economy, AC Chair Car, General Unreserved
- Seating arrangements: Yes
- Sleeping arrangements: Yes
- Auto-rack arrangements: Overhead racks
- Catering facilities: E-catering
- Observation facilities: Large windows
- Baggage facilities: No
- Other facilities: Below the seats

Technical
- Rolling stock: LHB coach
- Track gauge: 1,676 mm (5 ft 6 in)
- Operating speed: 130 km/h (81 mph) maximum, 54 km/h (34 mph) average including halts.

The Rajya Rani Express is a superfast express train operated by the East Central Railway zone of Indian Railways. It runs between Lalitgram railway station and Patna on five days of the week, and between Shaarsa and Patna on the remaining two days. It was operated in year 2012 From Saharsa patna Rajyarani superfast, in 2025 it was extended to lalitgram and downgrade to express, As lalitgram haven't any washing Peet, so this train was terminated to Saharsa two days for their primary maintenance

It operates as train number 15509 from Lalitgram to Patna Junction and as train number 15510 from Patna Junction to Lalitgram Junction. Between Saharsa and Patna, it operates as train number 15503, and in the reverse direction, from Patna to Saharsa, as train number 15504.

== Coaches ==
The 12567 / 68 Saharsa Junction–Patna Junction Rajya Rani Express has 3 AC Chair Car, 18 General coach 2 EOG. New LHB rakes allotted.

As is customary with most train services in India, coach composition may be amended at the discretion of Indian Railways depending on demand.

== Service ==
The 12567 / 68 Saharsa Junction–Patna Junction Rajya Rani Express covers the distance of 224 km (139 mi) in 04 hours 00 mins (56.00 km/h) in both directions .

As the average speed of the train is above 55 km/h (34 mph), as per Indian Railways rules, its fare includes a Superfast surcharge.

== Routeing ==
The 12567 / 12568 Saharsa–Patna Rajya Rani Express runs from Saharsa Junction via , Simri Bakhtiyarpur Mansi Junction, Khagaria Junction, Begusarai, New Barauni Junction, Mokama Junction, Bakhtiyarpur Junction to Patna Junction .

== Traction ==
earlier it was WDP-4D or a WDM-3D. As route is fully electrified, a Gomoh Loco Shed or Samastipur Loco Shed-based WAP-7 electric locomotive hauls the train for its entire journey.

== Operation ==
- 12567 Saharsa Junction–Patna Junction Rajya Rani Express runs from Saharsa Junction on a daily basis reaching Patna Junction the same day.
- 12568 Patna Junction–Saharsa Junction Rajya Rani Express runs from Patna Junction on a daily basis reaching Saharsa Junction the same day.

== Incidents ==
- On 19 August 2013, the 12567 Saharsa Junction–Patna Junction Rajya Rani Express ran over 37 persons and injured 24 persons who were illegally crossing the tracks at Dhamara Ghat station. Furious over the 12567 Saharsa Junction–Patna Junction Rajya Rani Express's refusal to give way to the trespassers or stop for them, a mob set fire to the engine and severely damaged railway property .

== See also ==
- Rajya Rani Express
- Dhamara Ghat train accident
