= Dhamara Ghat train accident =

2013 train derailment in Bihar, India

- Location of the accident within the Bihar State

Details
- Date: 19 August 2013; 08:40 IST (03:10 GMT)
- Location: Dhamara Ghat, Saharsa district, Bihar
- Coordinates: 25°35′25.67″N 86°35′57.95″E
- Country: India
- Operator: Indian Railways
- Incident type: Death by impact then triggered by the protest and the angry mobs

Statistics
- Trains: 1 (a High Speed Rajya Rani Express)
- Vehicles: WDP-4B locomotive
- Deaths: 28
- Injured: 24
- Damage: 1 train

The Dhamara Ghat train accident occurred on 19 August 2013 when the Saharsa Patna Rajya Rani Express train struck a large group of people at the Dhamara Ghat railway station in the Indian state of Bihar. At least 28 people were killed and 24 injured. The victims were mostly Hindu pilgrims returning from prayers at the nearby Katyayani temple. The accident triggered a protest by passengers who beat the driver unconscious, attacked staff and torched two coaches of the train. The chief minister of Bihar State, Nitish Kumar, called it "the rarest of rare tragedies". He pledged 200,000 rupees, or around $3,180, for the family of each victim, and urged the railway ministry to do the same.

== Casualties ==
According to S.K. Bhardwaj, a senior Bihar police officer, 37 people lost their lives. Among them were 13 women, four children and 20 men. The victims were walking along the tracks at Dhamara Ghat station after disembarking from the Samastipur-Saharsa passenger train when the Saharsa-Patna Rajya Rani Express travelling at 80 km/h, struck them.

== Similar Accident aka See also ==
- Castelldefels train accident - a similar accident that occurred in 2010.
