= Rajya Rani Express =

Train services in India

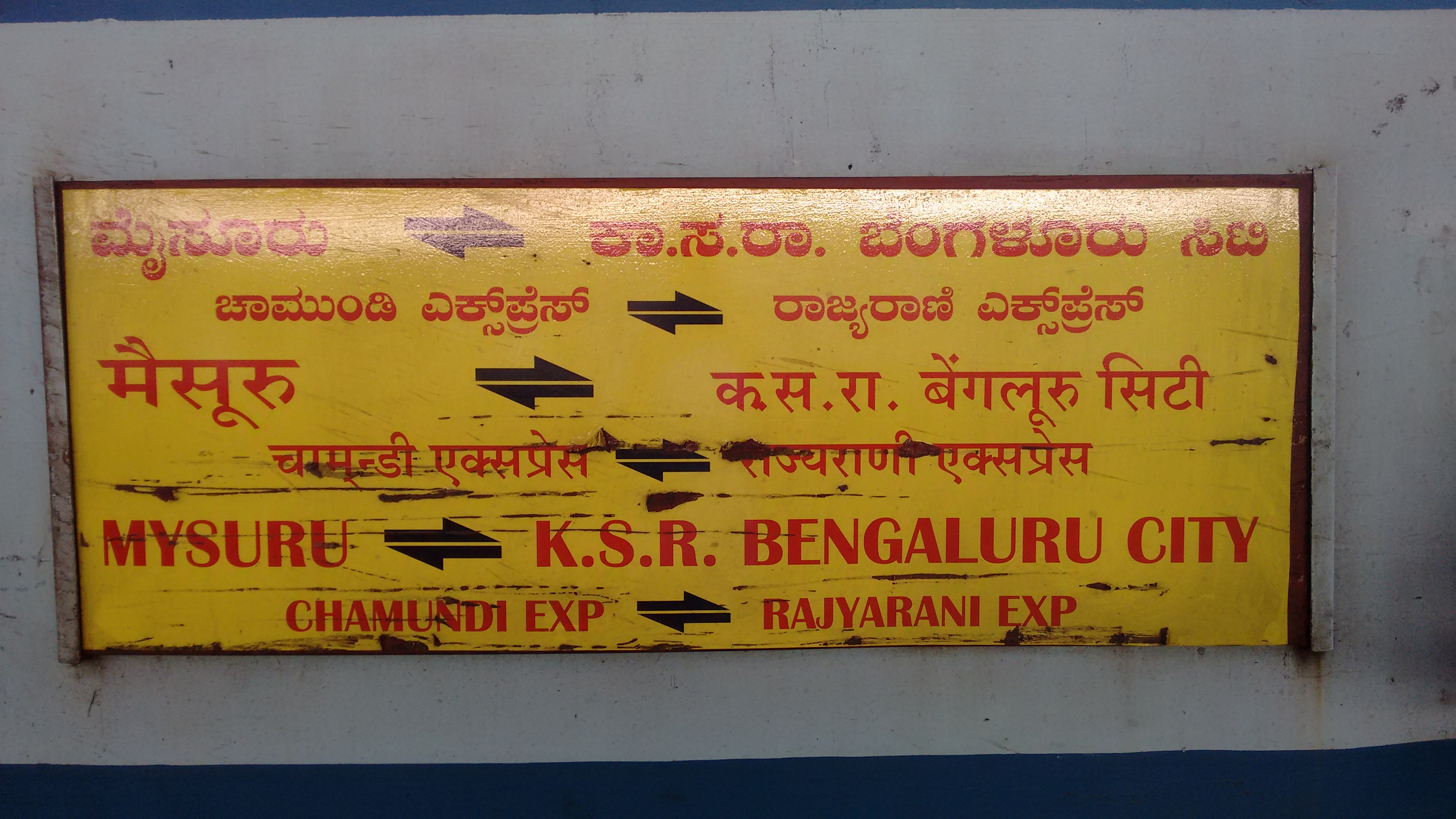
- Mysuru Bengaluru Rajyarani Express, first Rajya Rani Express in India.

Overview
- Main Operating: State capital to important cities in the state
- Other Operatings: Launched in 2011 (Between Bangalore and Mysore)
- Fleet: 10
- Parent company: Indian Railways
- Dates of operation: 1 July 2011–

Rajya Rani trains are a series of express trains operated by Indian Railways to connect state capitals with other cities important for tourism, pilgrimage or business.

== History ==
The word "Rajya" means "State" and the word "Rani" means Queen in Sanskrit and several Indian languages. The Rajya Rani trains were announced by the railway minister in railway budget 2011. The first Rajya Rani train was started between Mysore and Bangalore by Railway Minister Mamata Banerjee and was flagged off on 1 July 2011 by K. H. Muniyappa, Minister of State for Railways.

== Etymology ==
The train was named after Maharani Gayatri Devi, former princess of the state of Cooch Behar, Maharani of Jaipur. She was one of the world's 10 most beautiful women on the Vogue list. She shares space with the likes of Rabindranath Tagore (Kavi Guru Express) and Swami Vivekananda (Vivek Express) as the railways has named a series of trains as Rajya Rani Expresses to honour the late Rajmata of Jaipur.

On 22 May 2017, the Dadar-Sawantwadi Rajya Rani Express was named as "Tutari Express" to mark the centenary of Keshavasuta's famed poem titled "Tutari".

== Traction And Coach Rakes ==
All Rajya Rani Express trains today still runs with both ICF coaches or LHB coaches and they hauled by both diesel and electrified locomotives

- diesel locomotive like WDM-3A, WDM-3D and WDP-4D or WDP-4 (only ICF rakes)
- electric locomotive like WAP-4 and WAP-7 (both LHB and ICF rakes)

== Active services ==
S.No.	Train No.	Sector	Distance (km)	Date of introduction
1	20659 / 20660	Mysore – Bangalore	139	1 July 2011
2	11003 / 11004	Dadar – Sawantwadi Road	497	1 July 2011
3	~~22861 / 22862~~	~~Shalimar – Adra~~ (Canceled)	283	1 Oct 2011
4	22161 / 22162	Bhopal – Damoh	291	12 Nov 2011
5	16349 / 16350	Thiruvananthapuram North – Nilambur Road	443	16 Nov 2011
6	18117 / 18118	Rourkela – Gunupur	798	16 Nov 2011 (Started between Bhubaneswar and Rourkela. Later extended to Gunupur on 20 March 2017)
7	15417 / 15418	Alipurduar – Silghat	460	14 Feb 2012 (Started between Dhubri and Silghat. Later extended to Alipurduar on 1 October 2016)
8	22453 / 22454	Meerut – Lucknow	459	11 March 2012
9	17611 / 17612	Nanded – Mumbai CSMT	604	11 March 2012 (Started between Manmad and Mumbai CST. Later extended to Nanded on 10 January 2020)
10	12567 / 12568	Saharsa – Patna	214	18 March 2012

== Tragedy ==
- On 19 August 2013, the 12567 Saharsa Junction–Patna Junction Rajya Rani Express ran over 37 persons and injured 24 persons who were illegally crossing the tracks at Dhamara Ghat station. Furious over the 12567 Saharsa Junction–Patna Junction Rajya Rani Express's refusal to give way to the trespassers or stop for them, a mob set fire to the engine and severely damaged railway property

== See also ==
- Rajdhani Express
- Shatabdi Express
- Duronto Express
- Tejas Express
- Kavi Guru Express
- Vivek Express
- Yuva Express
