= Saharsa–Barauni Express =

Express train

Overview
- Service type: Express
- Current operator: East Central Railway zone

Route
- Termini: Barauni Junction (BJU); Saharsa Junction (SHC)
- Stops: 6
- Distance travelled: 107 km (66 mi)
- Average journey time: 2h 50m
- Service frequency: Daily (Note: Runs seven days in a week for every direction.)
- Train number: 15275/15276

On-board services
- Class: General Unreserved
- Seating arrangements: No
- Sleeping arrangements: Yes
- Catering facilities: On-board catering E-catering
- Observation facilities: ICF coach
- Entertainment facilities: No
- Baggage facilities: No
- Other facilities: Below the seats

Technical
- Rolling stock: 2
- Track gauge: 1,676 mm (5 ft 6 in)
- Operating speed: 38 km/h (24 mph), including halts

The Saharsa–Barauni Express was an Express train belonging to East Central Railway zone that runs between Saharsa Junction and Barauni Junction in India. It is currently being operated with 15275/15276 train numbers on a daily basis.

== Service ==
The 15275/Saharsa–Barauni Express has an average speed of 38 km/h and covers 107 km in 2h 50m. The 15276/Barauni–Saharsa Express has an average speed of 29 km/h and covers 107 km in 3h 40m.

== Route and halts ==
The important halts of the train are:

- Saharsa Junction
- Simri Bakhtiyarpur
- Koparia
- Dhamara Ghat
- Mansi Junction
- Khagaria Junction
- Begusarai
- Barauni Junction

== Coach composition ==
The train has standard ICF rakes with a max speed of 110 kmph. The train consists of 22 coaches:

- 20 General Unreserved
- 2 Seating cum Luggage Rake

== Traction ==
Both trains are hauled by a Samastipur Loco Shed-based WDM-3A diesel locomotive from Barauni to Saharsa and vice versa.

== Rake sharing ==
The train shares its rake with 15211/15212 Jan Nayak Express.

== See also ==
- Barauni Junction railway station
- Saharsa Junction railway station
- Jan Nayak Express
