= Poorbiya Express =

Train in India

Overview
- Service type: Express
- First service: 29 December 2006; 19 years ago
- Current operator: East Central Railway

Route
- Termini: Saharsa Junction (SHC); Anand Vihar Terminal (ANVT)
- Stops: 21
- Distance travelled: 1,181 km (734 mi) Primary maintenance - Saharsa coaching depot
- Average journey time: 24 hours 25 minutes
- Service frequency: Bi-weekly
- Train number: 15279 / 15280

On-board services
- Classes: AC First Class, AC 2 Tier, AC 3 Tier, Sleeper Class, General Unreserved
- Seating arrangements: Yes
- Sleeping arrangements: Yes
- Catering facilities: Available
- Observation facilities: Large windows
- Baggage facilities: No
- Other facilities: Below the seats

Technical
- Rolling stock: LHB coach
- Track gauge: 1,676 mm (5 ft 6 in)
- Operating speed: 49 km/h (30 mph) average including halts.

The 15279 / 15280 Poorbiya Express is an express train belonging to Indian Railways – East Central Railway zone that runs between Saharsa Junction and Anand Vihar Terminal in India.

It connects the major cities of Bihar and Uttar Pradesh like Saharsa, Barauni, Hajipur, Chhapra, Siwan, Deoria Sadar, Gorakhpur, Lucknow and Moradabad with the national capital Delhi (Anand Vihar Terminal). The aged ICF coaches of the train were replaced with LHB coach during second week of October 2018, increasing its speed limit to 130 kilometres per hour (81 mph). On 1 September 2019, catering facilities were introduced in this train.

== Coaches ==
The 15279/15280 Poorbiya Express has 1 First AC, 1 First cum Second AC, 2 AC 2 tier, 3 AC 3 tier, 9 Sleeper Class, 1 Pantry Car, 3 General Unreserved and 2 EOG Generator Car Total 22 coaches. As is customary with most train services in India, coach composition may be amended at the discretion of Indian Railways depending on demand.

== Service ==
The 15279 Poorbiya Express covers the distance of 1,210 km (752 mi) in 24 hours 10 mins (49 km/h) and in 25 hours 50 mins as 15280 Poorbiya Express (46 km/h).

According to Indian Railways rules, and as the average speed of the train is below 55 km/h (34 mph), its fare does not include a Superfast surcharge.

== Schedule ==
Train number	Station code	Departure station	Departure time	Departure day	Arrival station	Arrival time	Arrival day
15279	SHC	Saharsa	11:37 AM	Sun Thurs	Anand Vihar Terminal	11:45 AM	(next day) Mon Fri
15280	ANVT	Anand Vihar Terminal	17:10 PM	Mon Fri	Saharsa	18:50 PM	(next day) Tue Sat

== Route and halts ==
The 15279/15280 Poorbiya Express runs from Saharsa Junction via Khagaria Junction, Begusarai, Barauni Junction, Hajipur Junction, Siwan Junction, Bhatni Junction, Gorakhpur Junction, Gonda Junction, Lucknow NR, Shahjahanpur, Bareilly Junction, Moradabad Junction, Ghaziabad Junction to Anand Vihar Terminal.

== Traction ==
As the route is fully electrified, a Kanpur Loco Shed-based WAP-7 electric locomotive hauls the train for its entire journey.

== Operation ==
- 15279 Poorbiya Express runs from Saharsa Junction every Sunday reaching Anand Vihar Terminal the next day .
- 15280 Poorbiya Express runs from Anand Vihar Terminal every Monday reaching Saharsa Junction the next day .
