= Moth, Uttar Pradesh =

Moth
- Town
- Location in Uttar Pradesh, India Moth (India)
- Coordinates: 25.72°N 78.95°E
- Country: India
- State: Uttar Pradesh
- District: Jhansi

Population (2001)
  - Total: 13,029

Languages
  - Official: Hindi
- Time zone: UTC+5:30 (IST)
- Postal code: 284303
- Vehicle registration: UP
- Website: up.gov.in

Moth is a town and a nagar panchayat in Jhansi district in the Indian state of Uttar Pradesh.

== Demographics ==
As of 2011 India census, Moth had a population of 30,000. Males constitute 53% of the population and females 47%. Moth has an average literacy rate of 64%, higher than the national average of 59.5%: male literacy is 71%, and female literacy is 57%. In Moth, 15% of the population is under 0–6 years of age.
