= Hate Bazare Express (via Mansi) =

Express train in India

Overview
- Service type: Express
- Current operator: Eastern Railways

Route
- Termini: Sealdah; Saharsa Junction
- Stops: 27
- Distance travelled: 596 km (370 mi)
- Average journey time: 15 hours 00 mins
- Train number: 13163 / 13164

On-board services
- Classes: AC 1st Class, AC 2 tier, AC 3 tier, Sleeper, General
- Sleeping arrangements: Yes
- Catering facilities: No pantry car attached

Technical
- Rolling stock: ICF coach
- Track gauge: 1,676 mm (5 ft 6 in)
- Operating speed: 110 km/h (68 mph) maximum, 36 km/h (22 mph), including halts

Hate Bazare Express (via Mansi) is an Express train belonging to Eastern Railway zone of Indian Railways that run between Sealdah and Saharsa Junction in India. The name of the train is derived from the Bengali word Hate Bazare which means The Market place in English and also its a name of the novel wrote by Balai Chand Mukhopadhyay (Banaphool). The train was introduced in 1999-2000 year between Sealdah & Barauni after withdrawing the North Bihar Express which used to run from Howrah to Barauni via Bandel Junction, Katwa Junction, Azimganj, New Farakka Junction, Katihar, Mansi Junction, Khagaria Junction & Begusarai in the period of 1970–1999. Hate Bazare Express is the successor of the former North Bihar Express.

== Service ==
The 13163 Sealdah - Saharsa Junction Hate Bazare Express (via Mansi) covers the distance of 589 km (366 mi) in 15 hours 40 minutes (38 km/h) and in 15 hours 00 mins as the 13164 Saharsa Junction - Sealdah Hate Bazare Express (via Mansi) (39 km/h).

== Routes ==
Train set of Hate Bazare Express passes through Bandel Junction, Katwa Junction, Azimganj, New Farakka Junction, Katihar & Mansi Junction on both sides

== Traction ==
The train set is hauled by WAP-4 of Electric Loco Shed, Howrah or WAP-7 of Sealdah throughout the entire journey.

== Incident ==
On 12 July 2011, Hate Bazare Express has averted a train collision with the EMU local of Bandel–Katwa at Balagarh station in Hooghly district of West Bengal, no casualties reported.
