= Saharsa–Amritsar Garib Rath Express =

Train in India

Saharsa Junction - Amritsar Junction Garib Rath Express
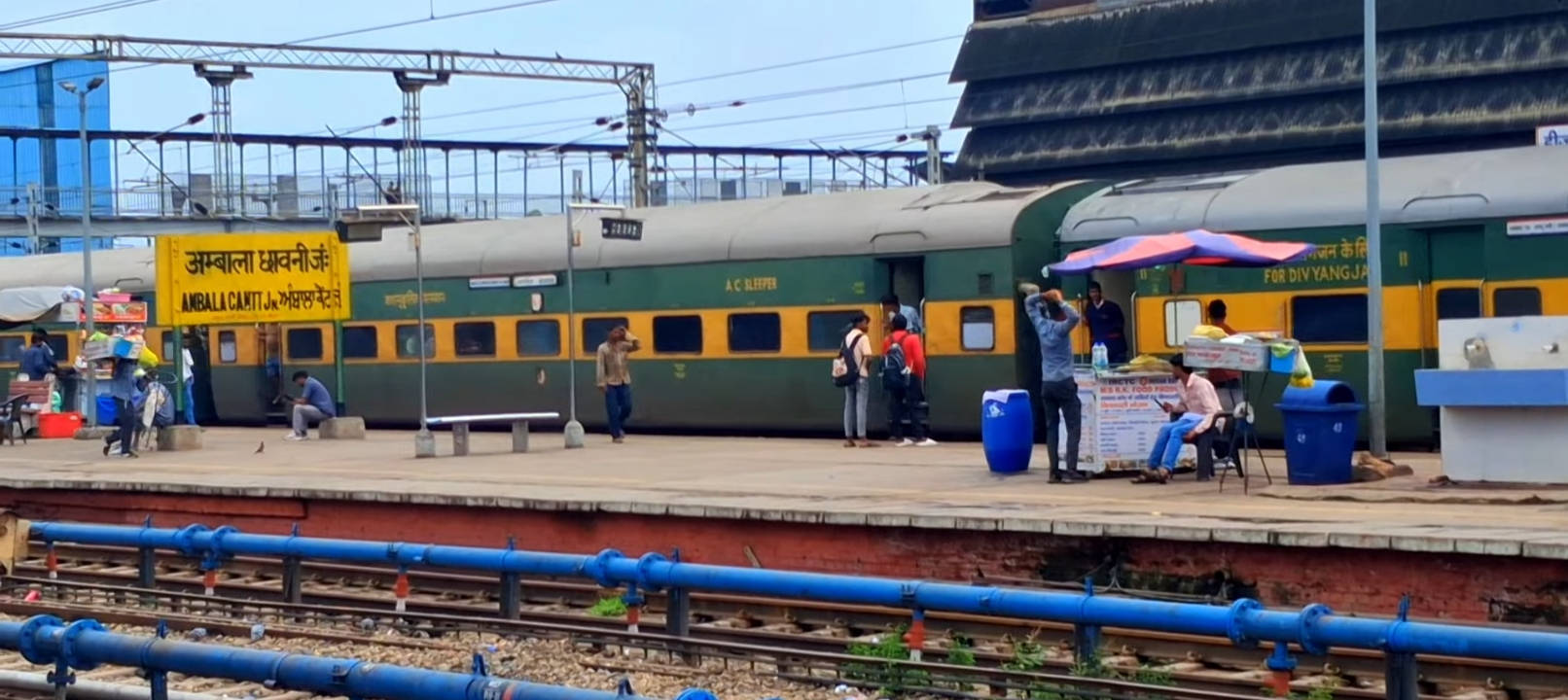
- Saharsa–Amritsar Garib Rath Express at Ambala Cantonment Junction railway station

Overview
- Service type: Superfast Express, Garib Rath Express
- First service: 5 October 2006
- Current operator: Northern Railways

Route
- Termini: Saharsa Junction; Amritsar Junction
- Stops: 11
- Distance travelled: 1,723 km (1,071 mi)
- Average journey time: 30 hours 00 minutes as 12203 Saharsa Amritsar Garib Rath Express, 29 hours 40 minutes as 12204 Amritsar Saharsa Garib Rath Express
- Service frequency: 3 days a week. 12203 Saharsa Amritsar Garib Rath Express – Monday, Thursday & Sunday. 12204 Amritsar Saharsa Garib Rath Express – Wednesday, Saturday & Sunday.
- Train number: 12203 / 12204

On-board services
- Classes: AC 3 Tier, AC Chair Car
- Seating arrangements: Yes
- Sleeping arrangements: Yes
- Catering facilities: No Pantry Car Coach attached
- Observation facilities: Large windows
- Baggage facilities: No
- Other facilities: Below the seats

Technical
- Rolling stock: LHB coach
- Track gauge: 1,676 mm (5 ft 6 in)
- Operating speed: 130 km/h (81 mph) maximum,57.75 km/h (36 mph), including halts
Route map
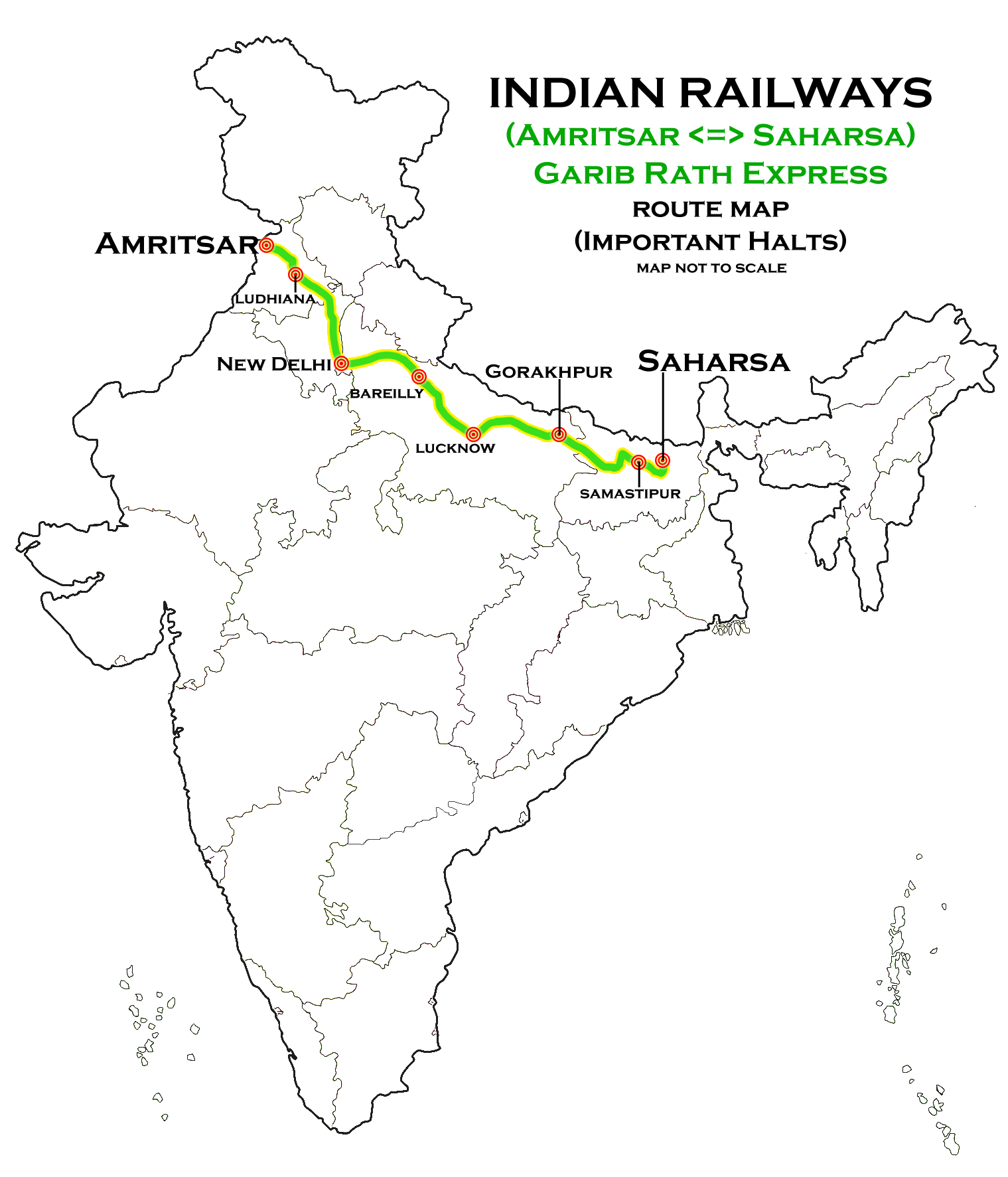

The 12203/12204 Saharsa–Amritsar Garib Rath Express is a superfast Garib Rath–category train operated by the Northern Railway of Indian Railways. It runs between Saharsa Junction in Bihar and Amritsar Junction in Punjab. The train operates as 12203 from Saharsa to Amritsar and as 12204 in the reverse direction, serving the states of Bihar, Uttar Pradesh, Delhi, Haryana, and Punjab.

== History ==
- The service was first inaugurated on 5 October 2006.
- It was the first Garib Rath Express train introduced in the Garib Rath series, launched under the tenure of then Railway Minister Lalu Prasad Yadav

== Coach composition ==
Type	Number of coaches
AC 3-tier Economy	20
LPR (Generator Car)	2
Total	22

== Route ==
Timetable of 12203/12204 Saharsa–Amritsar Garib Rath Express
12203 – Saharsa → Amritsar					12204 – Amritsar → Saharsa				
Station	Arr	Dep	Halt	Dist (km)	Station	Arr	Dep	Halt	Dist (km)
Saharsa Jn (SHC)	—	14:30	—	0	Amritsar (ASR)	—	04:00	—	0
S. Bhakhtiyarpur (SBV)	14:48	14:50	2m	17	Beas (BEAS)	04:28	04:30	2m	42
Khagaria Jn (KGG)	15:50	15:52	2m	53	Jalandhar City (JUC)	05:05	05:10	5m	79
Begusarai (BGS)	16:24	16:26	2m	94	Phagwara Jn (PGW)	05:28	05:30	2m	100
Barauni Jn (BJU)	16:50	17:00	10m	109	Dhandari Kalan (DDL)	06:20	06:30	10m	143
Dalsingh Sarai (DSS)	17:27	17:29	2m	137	Ambala Cantt Jn (UMB)	08:00	08:10	10m	249
Samastipur Jn (SPJ)	17:50	17:55	5m	160	Delhi Jn (DLI)	10:50	11:05	15m	446
Muzaffarpur Jn (MFP)	18:50	18:55	5m	212	Hapur (HPU)	12:17	12:19	2m	503
Hajipur Jn (HJP)	19:42	19:47	5m	266	Moradabad (MB)	13:48	13:53	5m	607
Chhapra (CPR)	21:20	21:25	5m	325	Bareilly (BE)	15:10	15:12	2m	698
Siwan Jn (SV)	22:15	22:20	5m	386	Hardoi (HRI)	16:54	16:56	2m	831
Deoria Sadar (DEOS)	23:15	23:17	2m	455	Lucknow Jn (LKO)	18:30	18:40	10m	933
Gorakhpur Jn (GKP)	00:35	00:45	10m	505	Gorakhpur Jn (GKP)	00:05	00:15	10m	1203
Lucknow Jn (LKO)	05:55	06:05	10m	775	Deoria Sadar (DEOS)	01:10	01:12	2m	1253
Hardoi (HRI)	07:33	07:35	2m	877	Siwan Jn (SV)	02:05	02:10	5m	1323
Bareilly (BE)	09:28	09:31	3m	1010	Chhapra (CPR)	03:15	03:20	5m	1384
Moradabad (MB)	11:02	11:10	8m	1101	Hajipur Jn (HJP)	04:27	04:32	5m	1443
Hapur (HPU)	12:25	12:27	2m	1205	Muzaffarpur Jn (MFP)	05:20	05:25	5m	1497
Delhi Jn (DLI)	13:55	14:10	15m	1262	Samastipur Jn (SPJ)	06:10	06:15	5m	1548
Ambala Cantt Jn (UMB)	16:49	16:54	5m	1459	Dalsingh Sarai (DSS)	06:38	06:40	2m	1572
Ludhiana Jn (LDH)	19:10	19:25	15m	1573	Barauni Jn (BJU)	07:35	07:45	10m	1599
Phagwara Jn (PGW)	19:54	19:56	2m	1608	Begusarai (BGS)	08:01	08:03	2m	1615
Jalandhar City (JUC)	20:30	20:35	5m	1630	Khagaria Jn (KGG)	08:36	08:38	2m	1655
Beas (BEAS)	21:05	21:07	2m	1666	S. Bhakhtiyarpur (SBV)	10:16	10:18	2m	1692
Amritsar (ASR)	22:05	—	—	1708	Saharsa Jn (SHC)	11:20	—	—	1708

== Traction ==
The train is powered by a WAP-5 or WAP-7 electric locomotive from Ghaziabad or Ludhiana loco sheds.

== Timings ==
Schedule of 12203/12204 Saharsa–Amritsar Garib Rath Express
Train No.	Direction	Origin → Destination	Departure	Arrival	Days of Operation
12203	Saharsa → Amritsar	Saharsa Jn → Amritsar Jn	15:00 hrs (IST)	21:00 hrs (Next Day)	Mon, Thu, Sun
12204	Amritsar → Saharsa	Amritsar Jn → Saharsa Jn	04:30 hrs (IST)	10:10 hrs (Next Day)	Wed, Sat, Sun

== Gallery ==
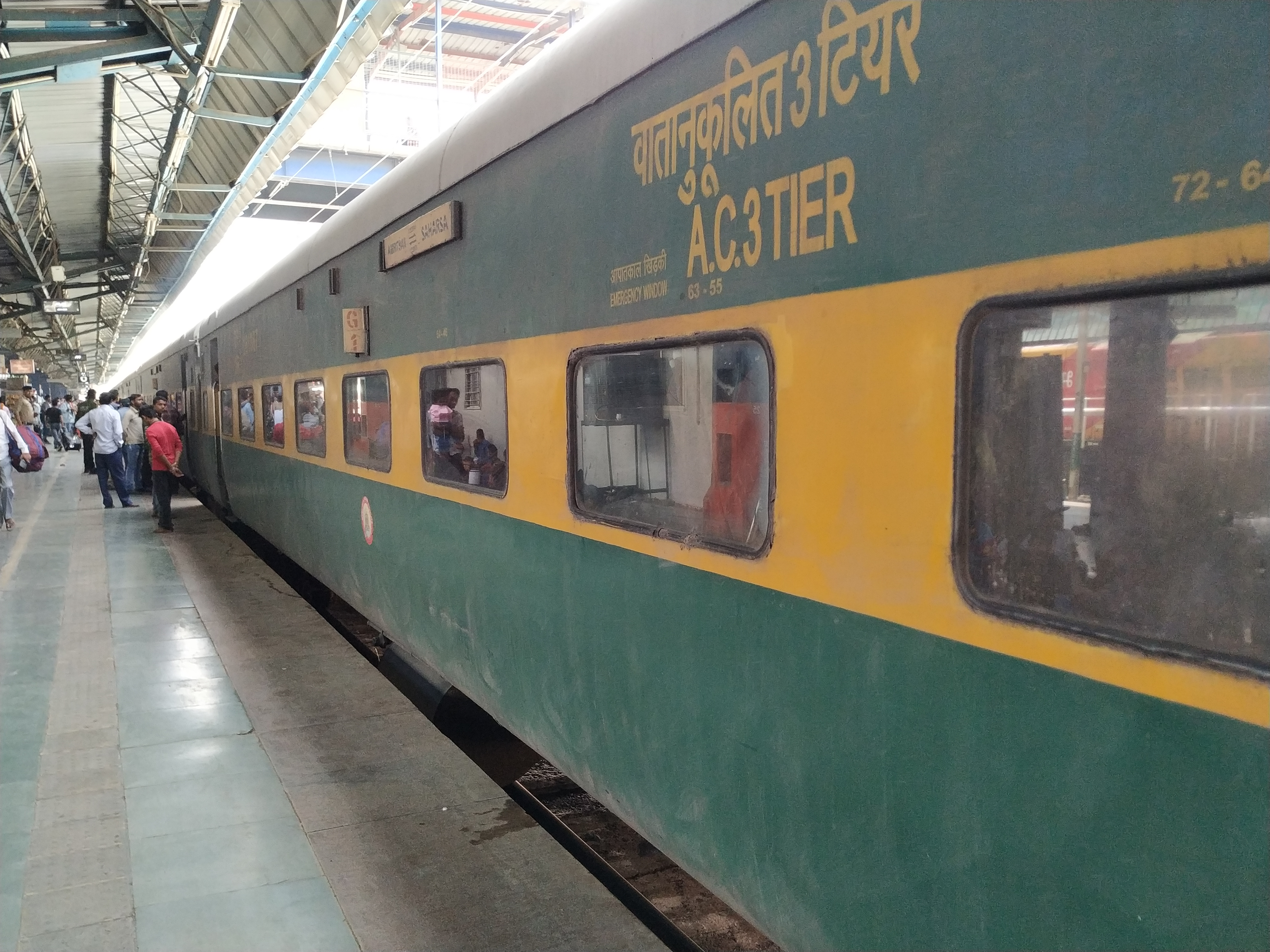
Amritsar-Saharsa Garib Rath Express in New Delhi at Platform 6.

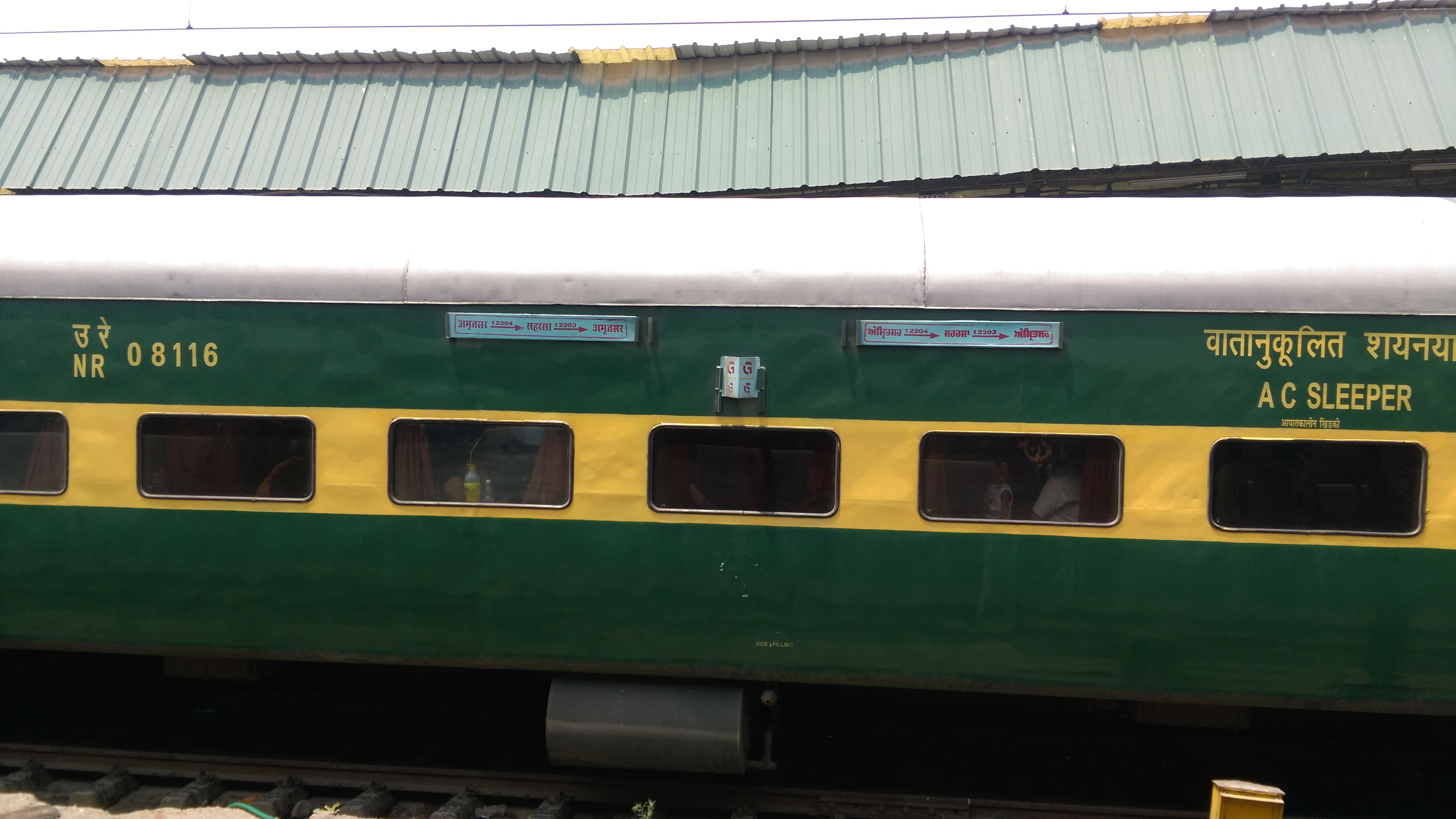
Saharsa Amritsar Garib Rath Express - AC 3 tier
