= New Barauni Junction =

Railway station in Begusarai, Bihar, India

NEW BARAUNI JUNCTION

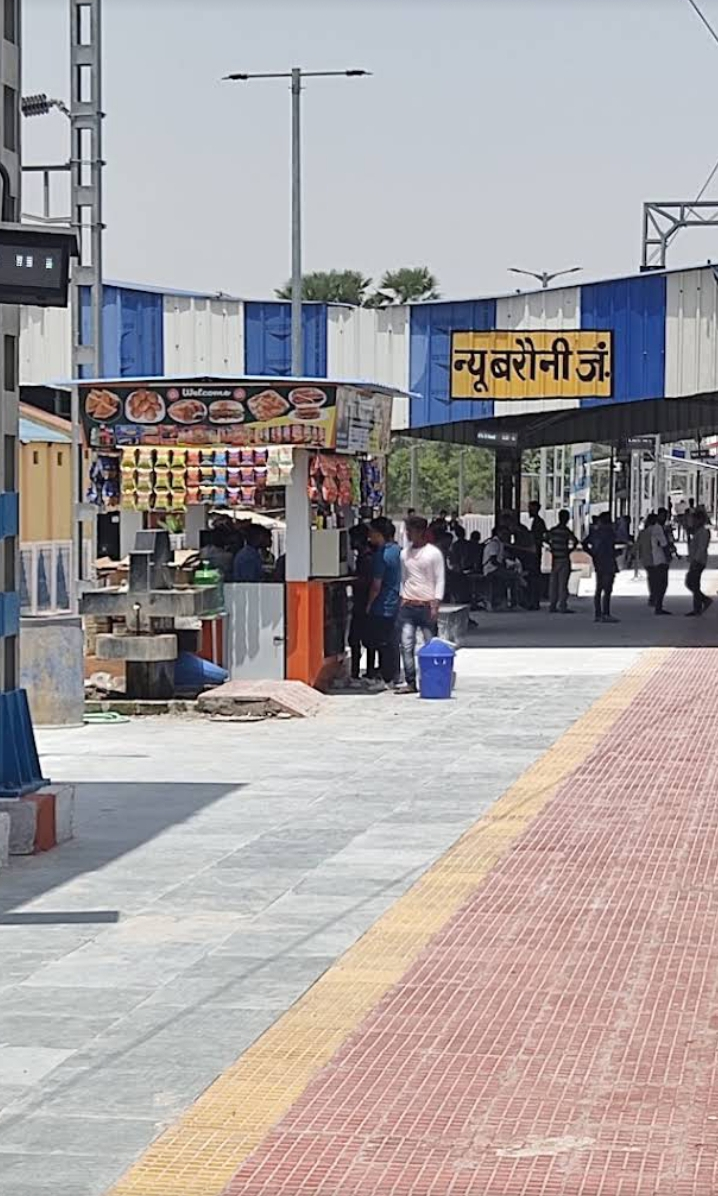
- New Barauni Junction Railway Station

General information
- Location: Barauni, Begusarai district, Bihar; India
- Coordinates: 25°27′44″N 85°59′17″E
- System: Indian Railways station
- Owner: Indian Railways
- Operator: East Central Railways
- Lines: Barauni - Mokama Section; Barauni–Katihar section Barauni–Guwahati line Jamalpur line
- Platforms: 2
- Tracks: 04
- Connections: Barauni Junction; Begusarai; Mokama Junction; Kiul Junction

Construction
- Structure type: Standard (on-ground station)
- Parking: yes
- Accessible: No

Other information
- Status: Functioning
- Station code: NBJU
- Zone(s): East Central Railway zone
- Division(s): Sonpur

History
- Opened: July 2009; 17 years ago
- Electrified: 2001–02
- Former names: East Indian Railway
Route map
Location
- Location within Bihar Location within India

New Barauni Junction railway station (station code NBJU), is a railway station in the Sonpur division of East Central Railway. New Barauni Junction is located in Barauni city in Begusarai district in the Indian state of Bihar.

== Platforms and facilities ==
New Barauni Junction has two platforms reached with foot overbridges. A second foot overbridge will be built at this station. The major facilities available are waiting rooms, toilets, tea stall, fruit stall, meal stall etc. Vehicles are allowed to enter the station premises.

== See also ==
- Barauni Junction railway station
