= Saharsa–Rajendra Nagar Terminal Intercity Express =

Express train in Bihar

Saharsa - Rajendra Nagar Terminal Intercity Express
Overview
- Service type: Express
- Current operator: East Central Railway zone

Route
- Termini: Saharsa Junction; Rajendra Nagar Terminal
- Stops: 15
- Distance travelled: 212 km (132 mi)
- Service frequency: Daily
- Train number: 13227 / 13228

On-board services
- Classes: AC Chair car, general unreserved, Chair car
- Seating arrangements: Yes
- Sleeping arrangements: Ye
- Catering facilities: No

Technical
- Rolling stock: Standard Indian Railways Coaches
- Operating speed: 31.5 km/h (20 mph)

The 13228/27 Saharsa - Rajendra Nagar Terminal Intercity Express is an Express train belonging to Indian Railways [East Central railway ] that runs between Saharsa Junction and Rajendra Nagar Terminal in India.

It operates as train number 13227/from Saharsa Junction to Rajendra Nagar Terminal and as train number 13228 in the reverse direction serving the states of Bihar.

== Coaches ==
The 13227/28 Saharsa - Rajendra Nagar Terminal Intercity Express has one AC Chair Car, eight general unreserved & two SLR (seating with luggage rake) coaches . It does not carry a pantry car coach.

As is customary with most train services in India, coach composition may be amended at the discretion of Indian Railays depending on demand.

== Service ==
The 13227Saharsa Junction - Rajendra Nagar Terminal Intercity Express covers the distance of 212 km (132 mi) in 6 hours 45 mins (32 km/h) and in 6 hours 55 mins as the 13228Rajendra Nagar Terminal - Saharsa Junction Intercity Express (31 km/h).

As the average speed of the train is lower than 55 km/h (34 mph), as per railway rules, its fare doesn't includes a Superfast surcharge.

== Routing ==
The 13227/ 28 Saharsa - Rajendra Nagar Terminal Intercity Express runs from Saharsa Junction via Khagaria Junction, Barauni Junction, Bakhtiyarpur Junction to Rajendra Nagar Terminal.

== Traction ==
As the route is now fully electrified Wap 7 electric locomotive (samastipur ) used in this train in the entire journey
