= Rajendra Nagar, Patna =

Rajendra Nagar
- Neighbourhood
- Location in Patna, India
- Coordinates: 25°36′24″N 85°9′53″E
- Country: India
- State: Bihar
- Metro: Patna

Languages
  - Spoken: Hindi, English
- Time zone: UTC+5:30 (IST)
- PIN: 800016
- Planning agency: Patna Regional Development Authority
- Civic agency: Patna Municipal Corporation

Rajendra Nagar (often spelled Rajender Nagar) is a neighbourhood in Patna, Bihar, India. It is named after Rajendra Prasad, the first President of India. It is spread between Kumhrar road and Nala road from Dinkar golambar and Ramakrishna Avenue to Saidpur road. The area is served by Kadamkuan PS of Patna Police.

== Overview ==
Rajendra Nagar is a planned colony divided by numbered roads. It has several open spaces like parks and playing fields. Rajendra Nagar also hosts the biggest stadium of Bihar, Moin-ul-Haq Stadium (formerly Rajendra Nagar Stadium).

== Transport ==
Rajendra Nagar Terminal is the railway station for the Rajendra Nagar. It connects to many metropolitan cities of India by the Howrah-Delhi Main Line. The important trains include the Rajendra Nagar (Patna) Rajdhani Express, Rajendranagar Express (Patna- Mumbai), Patna- Indore Express etc.
