= Howrah–Darbhanga Express =

Train in the East Central Railway zone, India

Howrah–Darbhanga Weekly Express
Overview
- Service type: Express
- First service: 1 October 2011; 14 years ago
- Current operator: East Central Railway zone

Route
- Termini: Howrah (HWH); Darbhanga (DBG)
- Stops: 9
- Distance travelled: 536 km (333 mi)
- Average journey time: 11h 30m
- Service frequency: Weekly (Note: Runs one day in a week for every direction.)
- Train number: 15235 / 15236

On-board services
- Classes: AC 2 tier, AC 3 tier, Sleeper class, General Unreserved
- Seating arrangements: Yes
- Sleeping arrangements: Yes
- Catering facilities: On-board catering, E-catering
- Observation facilities: Large windows
- Other facilities: Below the seats

Technical
- Rolling stock: LHB coach
- Track gauge: 1,676 mm (5 ft 6 in)
- Operating speed: 47 km/h (29 mph) average including halts

The 15235 / 15236 Howrah–Darbhanga Weekly Express is an Express train belonging to East Central Railway zone that runs between Howrah Junction and Darbhanga Junction in India. It is currently being operated with 15235/15236 train numbers on a weekly basis.

== Service ==
The 15235/Howrah–Darbhanga Express has an average speed of 47 km/h and covers 536 km in 11h 30m. The 15236/Darbhanga–Howrah Express has an average speed of 48 km/h and covers 536 km in 11h 15m.

== Route & halts ==
The important halts of the train are:

- Howrah
- Barddhaman Junction
- Durgapur
- Asansol Junction
- Chittaranjan
- Madhupur Junction
- Jasidih Junction
- Jhajha
- Barauni Junction
- Samastipur Junction
- Darbhanga

== Coach composition ==
The train has LHB rakes with a maximum speed of 160 kmph. The train consists of 19 coaches:

- 1 AC II Tier
- 1 AC III Tier
- 9 Sleeper coaches
- 6 General Unreserved
- 2 Seating cum Luggage Rake

== Traction ==
Both trains are hauled by a Gomoh Loco Shed / Samastipur Loco Shed-based WAP-7 electric locomotive from Darbhanga to Howrah and vice versa.

== Rake sharing ==
The train shares its rake with 15233/15234 Maithili Express.

== See also ==
- Darbhanga Junction railway station
- Howrah Junction railway station
- Maithili Express
