= Maithili Express =

Train in India

Overview
- Service type: Express
- Locale: Bihar, Jharkhand & West Bengal
- First service: 6 December 2010; 15 years ago
- Current operator: East Central Railway

Route
- Termini: Darbhanga (DBG); Kolkata (KOAA)
- Stops: 8
- Distance travelled: 540 km (336 mi)
- Average journey time: 11 hours 50 minutes
- Service frequency: Bi-weekly
- Train number: 15233 / 15234

On-board services
- Classes: AC 2 Tier, AC 3 Tier, Sleeper Class, General Unreserved
- Seating arrangements: Yes
- Sleeping arrangements: Yes
- Catering facilities: On-board catering, E-catering
- Observation facilities: Large windows
- Baggage facilities: No
- Other facilities: Below the seats

Technical
- Rolling stock: LHB coach
- Track gauge: 1,676 mm (5 ft 6 in)
- Operating speed: 49 km/h (30 mph) average including halts.
Route map
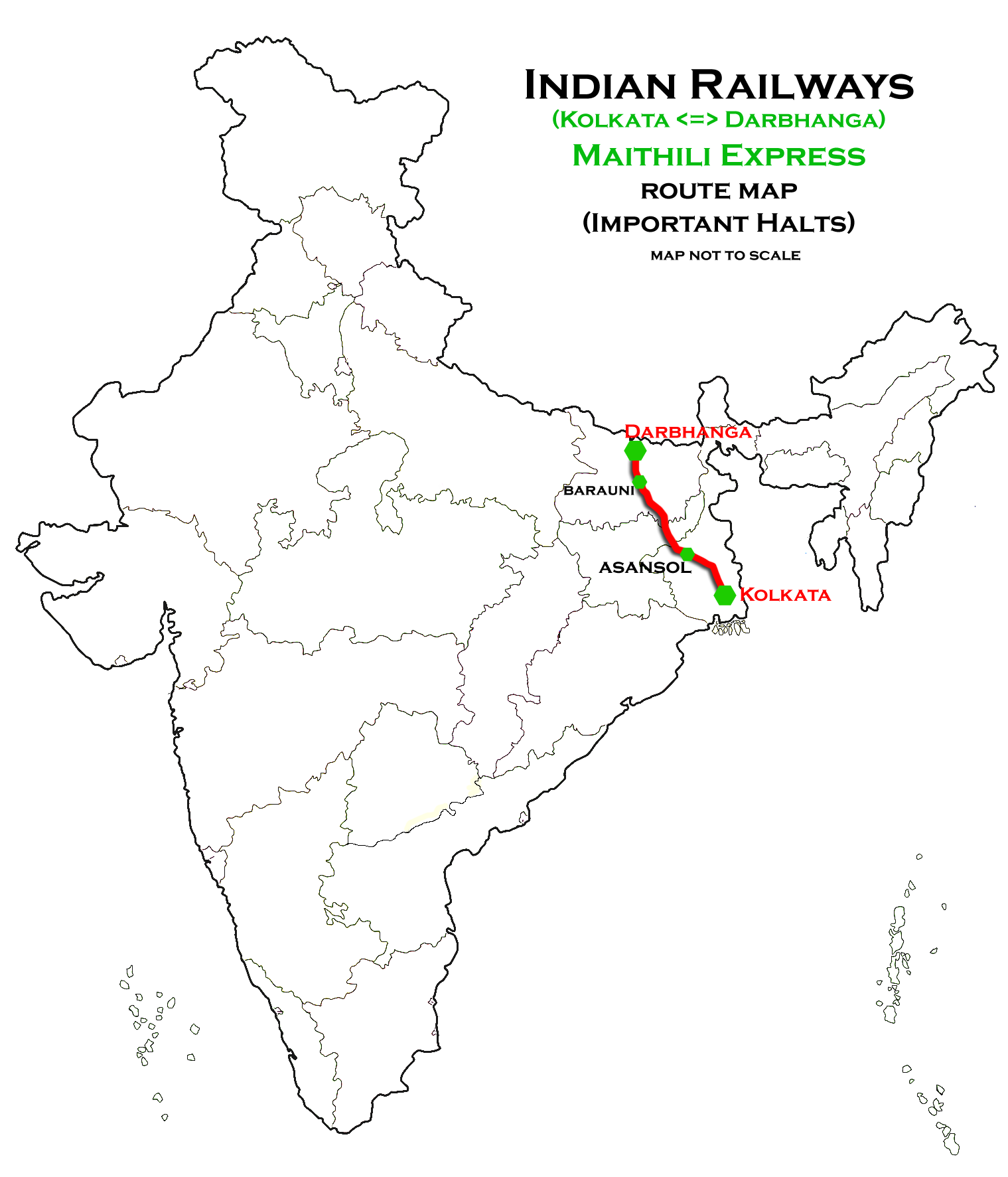

The 15233 / 15234 Maithili Express is express train of Indian Railways. It is connecting Kolkata with Darbhanga. It covers a distance of 539 kilometers at an average speed of 49 kmph. It has general, AC two tier, AC three tier, and sleeper classes. All classes except general require reservations. There is no pantry car, although tatkal scheme is available. It is hauled by WAM-4, WAP-4 and WDM-3A classes of locomotives.

== Route and halts ==
The train runs from Darbhanga via Samastipur Junction, Barauni Junction, Jhajha, Jasidih Junction, Asansol Junction, Durgapur, Bardhaman Junction, Dakshineswar to Kolkata.

== Traction ==
Both trains are hauled by a Gomoh Loco Shed / Samastipur Loco Shed-based WAP-7 electric locomotive from Kolkata to Darbhanga, and vice versa.

== Rake sharing ==
The train shares its rake with 15235/15236 Howrah–Darbhanga Express.

== Timings ==
- 15233 Maithili Express departs Kolkata station at 10:40 on Monday, Thursday and reaches Darbhanga at 22:15 same day.
- 15234 Maithili Express departs Darbhanga at 16:10 on Sunday, Wednesday and reaches Kolkata station at 3:10 next day.

== Timetable ==
15233 - Chitpur (Kolkata) to Darbhanga

Station code	Station name	Arrival	Departure
KOAA	Kolkata Terminus, West Bengal	Starting station	10:40
BWN	Barddhaman Junction	12:16	12:21
DGR	Durgapur	13:18	13:20
ASN	Asansol Junction	14:11	14:21
JAJ	Jhajha	17:20	17:25
BJU	Barauni Junction	19:55	20:15
SPJ	Samastipur Junction	21:05	21:10
DBG	Darbhanga Junction	22:15	Destination station

15234 - Darbhanga to Chitpur (Kolkata)

Station code	Station name	Arrival	Departure
DBG	Darbhanga Junction	Starting station	16:10
SPJ	Samastipur Junction	16:55	16:58
BJU	Barauni Junction	17:50	18:10
JAJ	Jhajha	20:25	20:30
ASN	Asansol Junction	23:15	23:25
DGR	Durgapur	00:03	00:05
BWN	Barddhaman Junction	01:10	01:15
KOAA	Kolkata Terminus, West Bengal	03:10	Destination station
