= Sampoorna Kranti Express =

Train in India

Sampoorna Kranti Superfast Express
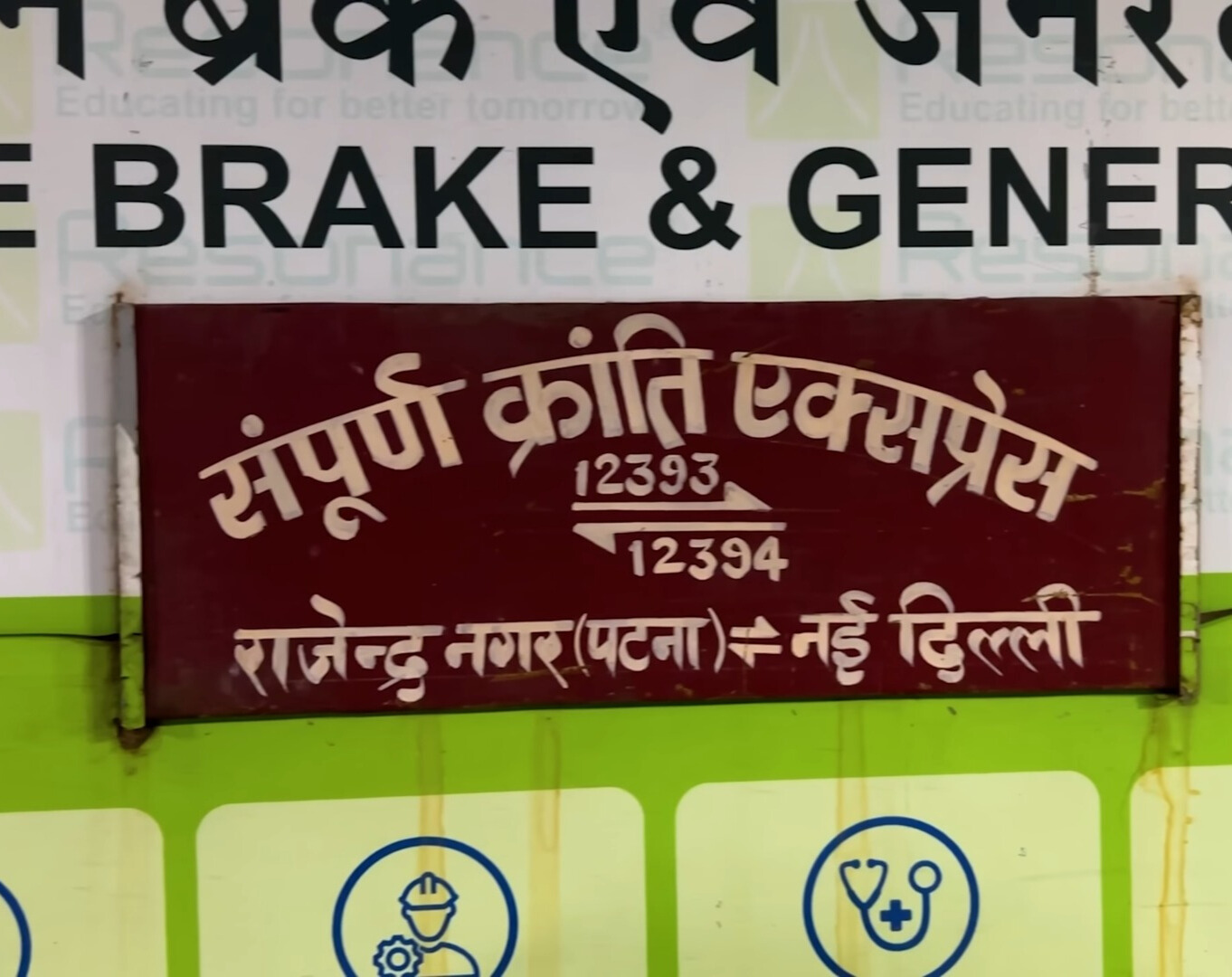
- Sampoorna Kranti Express train board

Overview
- Service type: Superfast Express
- Locale: Bihar, Uttar Pradesh & Delhi
- First service: 17 February 2002; 24 years ago
- Current operator: East Central Railway

Route
- Termini: Rajendra Nagar Terminal (RJPB); New Delhi (NDLS)
- Stops: 5
- Distance travelled: 1,001 km (622 mi)
- Average journey time: 12 hours 10 minutes
- Service frequency: Daily
- Train number: 12393 / 12394

On-board services
- Classes: AC First Class, AC 2 Tier, AC 3 Tier, Sleeper Class, General Unreserved
- Seating arrangements: Yes
- Sleeping arrangements: Yes
- Catering facilities: Available
- Observation facilities: Large windows
- Baggage facilities: Available
- Other facilities: Below the seats

Technical
- Rolling stock: LHB coach
- Track gauge: 1,676 mm (5 ft 6 in)
- Operating speed: 82 km/h (51 mph) average including halts.

The 12393 / 12394 Sampoorna Kranti Superfast Express is a Daily High Priority Superfast Express train of Indian Railways that runs between Rajendra Nagar Terminal, Patna (Bihar) and New Delhi (Delhi). Introduced on 16 February 2002, the train covers a distance of 1,001 km (622 mi) in under 12 hours, making it one of the fastest daily-running non-AC trains in India. Sampoorna Kranti Express is also called as Aam Janta Ki Rajdhani.

The train has an average speed of 82.27 km/h (51.12 mph), comparable to that of the Rajdhani Express. Due to its Rajdhani-like speed with comparatively lower fares, it is popularly referred to as “Aam Janta Ki Rajdhani”. It receives Exceptional High operational priority on its route and, as per its timetable, overtakes multiple scheduled passenger trains. Between Patna and New Delhi, it has only four scheduled stops: Kanpur Central, Mirzapur, Pandit Deen Dayal Upadhyaya Junction, and Ara Junction. .

== History ==
The Sampoorna Kranti Superfast Express is named after the Sampoorna Kranti movement launched from Bihar in the 1970s. At the time of its introduction, the train operated with 24 blue ICF coaches, which was the maximum permissible length then, and ran non-stop between its origin and destination—an uncommon feature in Indian Railways at the time.

Initially hauled by a WAP-4 locomotive, it became the only non-AC ICF-coached train of Indian Railways to operate at a maximum speed of 115 km/h. The train later became the first non-AC superfast train to be upgraded to LHB coaches. It is currently hauled by a WAP-7 locomotive and operates using the Head-on Generation (HOG) system.

Since 8 August 2015, the train has been permitted by Indian Railways to run at speeds of up to 130 km/h, and is considered among the highest-priority non-AC trains of Indian Railways, particularly under the East Central Railway.

== Schedule ==
12393 / 12394 Sampoorna Kranti Superfast Express
Train Type	Superfast Express
Distance	1001 km
Average Speed	~83 km/h
Journey Time (RJPB → NDLS)	12 hrs 30 min
Journey Time (NDLS → RJPB)	13 hrs 45 min
Classes Available	1A, 2A, 3A, 3E, SL, GEN
Operating Days	Daily
Operator	East Central Railway

== Route and halts ==
12393 and 12394 Sampoorna Kranti Superfast Express
Sr.	12393 RJPB–NDLS (Daily)				12394 NDLS–RJPB (Daily)			
Sr.	Station	Day	Arr.	Dep.	Station	Day	Arr.	Dep.
1	Rajendra Nagar Terminal	1	—	19:25	New Delhi railway station	1	—	17:30
2	Patna Junction	1	19:35	19:45	Kanpur Central	1	22:22	22:30
3	Danapur	1	19:55	19:57	Mirzapur	2	01:43	01:45
4	Ara Junction	1	20:20	20:22	Pt. Deen Dayal Upadhyaya Junction	2	03:15	03:25
5	Pt. Deen Dayal Upadhyaya Junction	1	22:20	22:30	Ara Junction	2	05:08	05:10
6	Mirzapur	1	23:21	23:23	Danapur	2	05:48	05:50
7	Kanpur Central	2	02:25	02:30	Patna Junction	2	06:35	06:45
8	New Delhi railway station	2	07:55	—	Rajendra Nagar Terminal	2	07:15	—

== Coach composition ==
Category	Types	Total
Locomotive (LOCO)	WAP class	1
Vistadome Power Car (VP)	VP	1
Second Class cum Luggage Rake (SLRD) – Divyangjan	SLRD	1
Unreserved General (GEN)	GEN (3, 4, 21, 22)	4
Sleeper Class (SL)	S1, S2, S3, S4, S5, S6	6
AC Three Tier (3A)	B1, B2, B3, B4, B5	5
AC Three Tier Economy (3E)	M1	1
AC Two Tier (2A)	A1, A2	2
AC First Class (1A)	H1	1
Luggage-cum-Power Car (EoG)	EoG	1
Total Coaches		23

== Traction ==
Both trains are hauled by a Gomoh Loco Shed or Samastipur Loco Shed-based WAP-7 electric locomotive from end to end.

== See also ==
- Sapt Kranti Express
- Sanghamitra Superfast Express
- Bagmati Express
- Indian Railways coaching stock
