= Howrah–Rajendra Nagar Express =

Train in India

Howrah - Rajendra Nagar Express
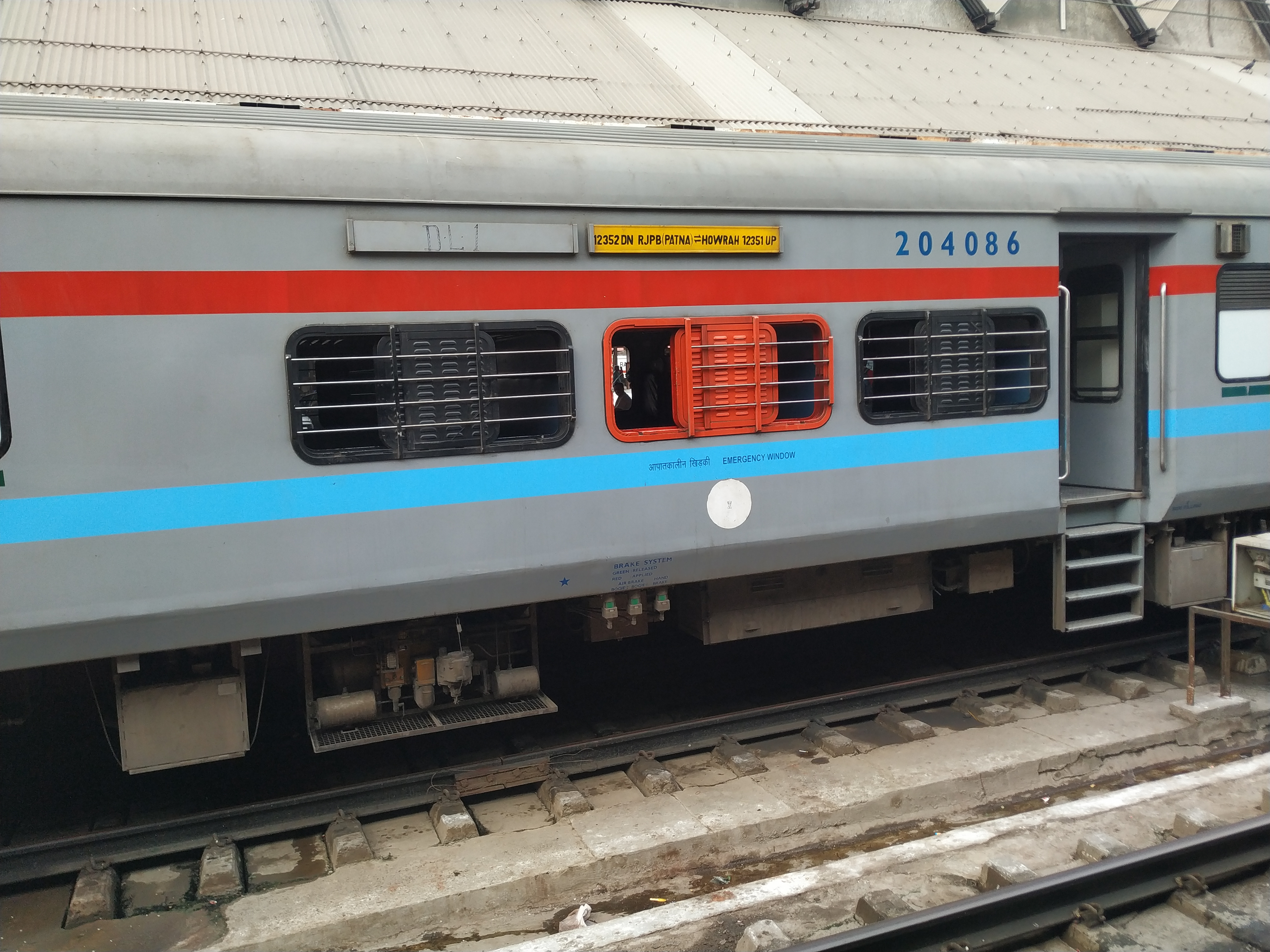
- Rajendra Nagar Terminal-Howrah Express standing on platform 8 of Howrah railway station.

Overview
- Service type: Superfast
- Locale: West Bengal, Jharkhand & Bihar
- First service: 1 April 1984; 42 years ago
- Current operator: East Central Railway

Route
- Termini: Howrah (HWH); Rajendra Nagar Terminal (RJPB)
- Stops: 19
- Distance travelled: 529 km (329 mi)
- Average journey time: 9hrs 25mins as 12351 9hrs 15mins as 12352
- Service frequency: Daily
- Train number: 12351 / 12352

On-board services
- Classes: AC First Class, AC 2 tier, AC 3 tier, Sleeper Class, General Unreserved
- Seating arrangements: Yes
- Sleeping arrangements: Yes
- Catering facilities: On-board catering, E-catering Is Only Available at Howrah, Bardhhaman, Durgapur & Asansol
- Observation facilities: Large windows
- Baggage facilities: No
- Other facilities: Below the seats

Technical
- Rolling stock: LHB coach
- Track gauge: 1,676 mm (5 ft 6 in)
- Operating speed: 56 km/h (35 mph) average including halts.

The 12351 / 12352 Howrah - Rajendra Nagar Express is an Indian Railways Superfast train which daily runs between Howrah in West Bengal and Rajendra Nagar Terminal of Bihar.

== Coach composite ==
The train has standard LHB rakes with max speed of 130 km/h. The train consists of 22 coaches:

- 1 AC First-class
- 2 AC II Tier
- 7 AC III Tier
- 6 Sleeper Coaches
- 4 General
- 2 Second-class Luggage/parcel van

== Coach composition ==
Coach composition are as follows(for 12352)-

| Loco | 1 | 2 | 3 | 4 | 5 | 6 | 7 | 8 | 9 | 10 | 11 | 12 | 13 | 14 | 15 | 16 | 17 | 18 | 19 | 20 | 21 | 22 |
|---|---|---|---|---|---|---|---|---|---|---|---|---|---|---|---|---|---|---|---|---|---|---|
| | SLR | GS | GS | GS | GS | S1 | S2 | S3 | S4 | S5 | S6 | B1 | B2 | B3 | B4 | B5 | B6 | B7 | A1 | A2 | H1 | EOG |

And for 12351 it is the reverse.

== Development ==
On 14 October 2020, replacing the old ICF coaches, Howrah – Rajendra Nagar –Express got new German LHB rakes. Modern LHB coach are more comfortable and at the same time faster than the conventional ICF coaches. The new coaches, based on a German technology Linke Hoffman Busch, are made of stainless steel which do not turn turtle during accidents; the light-weight coaches will improve the train's speed. 9:20 pm.Rajendra nagar Terminal at 6:25 am.I will take halt on Patna junction And Danapur.Bigger windows, lamps at all AC seats and sound insulation are the other facilities of this train. Howrah – Rajendra Nagar Express runs with 1 AC 1 tier coach, 2 AC 2 tier coaches,7 AC 3 tier coaches, 6 Sleeper coaches, 5 General coaches along with 2 EOG coaches. Thus, having a total of 22 LHB coach; the normal locomotive of Howrah – Rajendra Nagar – Express is a WAP-7 locomotive of Gomoh/Samastipur shed. The locomotive in-charge for this train is WAP-7 Gomoh/Samastipur Shed. Before that it was hauled by WAP-7 Howrah Shed. Earlier was hauled by a WAP-4 Howrah Shed. Earlier It was used to run till Danapur in Patna, but it now has been Terminated At Rajendra Nagar Terminal

== Service ==
The 12351/Howrah – Rajendra Nagar – Express has an average speed of 56 km/h and covers 529 km in 9 hrs 25 mins. 12352/– Rajendra Nagar Patna – Howrah Express has an average speed of 57 km/h and covers 529 km in 9 hrs 15 mins.

== Traction ==
It is regularly hauled by a Samastipur Loco Shed or Gomoh Loco Shed-based WAP-7 electric locomotive from end to end.

== See also ==
- Rajendra Nagar Terminal
- Bakhtiyarpur Junction
- Kiul Junction
- Jamui
- Jasidih Junction
- Asansol Junction
- Durgapur
- Bardhaman Junction
- Howrah Junction
