= Rajendra Nagar–New Delhi Tejas Rajdhani Express =

Train in India

Rajendra Nagar Terminal (Patna) - New Delhi Tejas Rajdhani Express

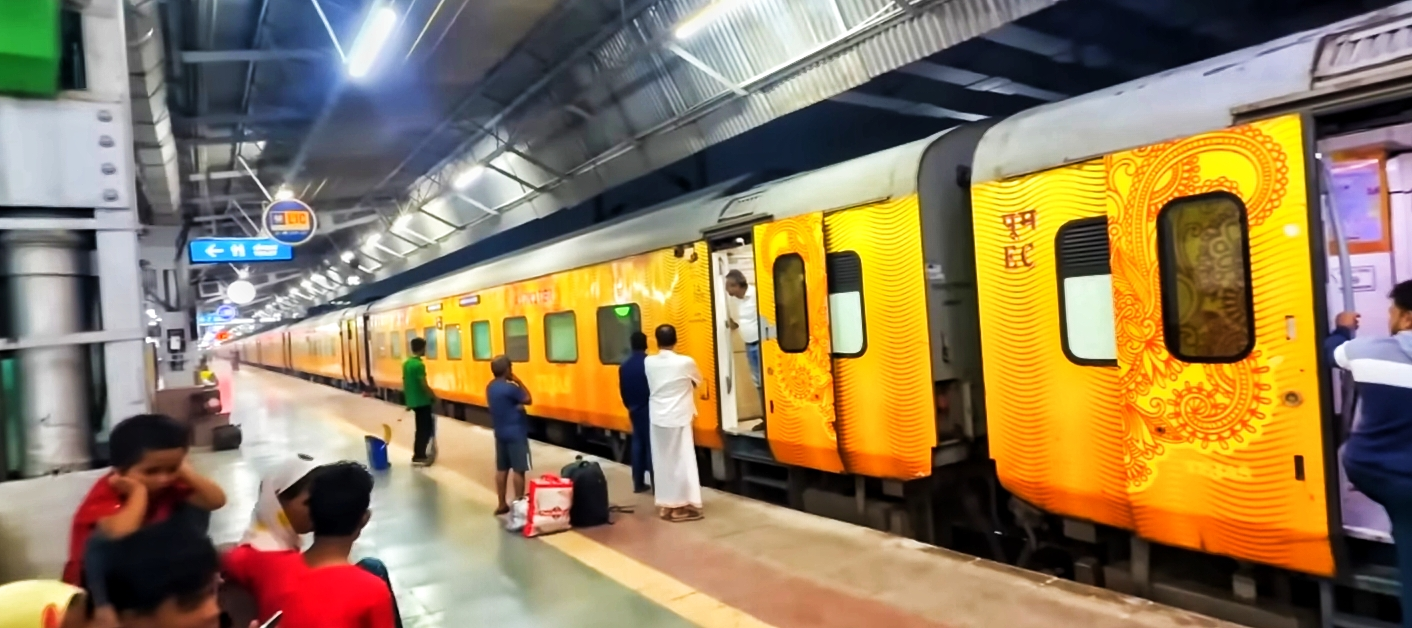
- Rajendra Nagar-New Delhi Tejas Rajdhani Express At Prayagraj Junction railway station

Overview
- Service type: Tejas Rajdhani Express
- Locale: Bihar, Uttar Pradesh & Delhi
- First service: 1 September 1996; 30 years ago
- Current operator: East Central Railway

Route
- Termini: Rajendra Nagar Terminal (RJPB); New Delhi (NDLS)
- Stops: 5
- Distance travelled: 1,001 km (622 mi)
- Average journey time: 12 hours 20 minutes
- Service frequency: Daily
- Train number: 12309 / 12310
- Lines used: Asansol–Patna (from Rajendra Nagar Terminal.); Patna–Mughalsarai section; Mughalsarai–Kanpur section; Kanpur–Delhi line (till New Delhi)

On-board services
- Classes: AC First Class, AC 2 Tier, AC 3 Tier
- Seating arrangements: Yes
- Sleeping arrangements: Yes
- Catering facilities: Available
- Observation facilities: Large windows
- Entertainment facilities: Wi-Fi
- Baggage facilities: Available
- Other facilities: Below the seats

Technical
- Rolling stock: Tejas rakes
- Track gauge: 1,676 mm (5 ft 6 in)
- Operating speed: 130 km/h (81 mph) maximum, 81.5 km/h (51 mph) average including halts.

Fastest train from Patna Jn to New Delhi

The 12309/12310 Rajendra Nagar Terminal–New Delhi Tejas Rajdhani Express is a premium-class Tejas Rajdhani Express train operated by the Indian Railways. It connects Patna, the capital of Bihar, with New Delhi, the national capital of India. Popularly known as the Patna Tejas Rajdhani, it is the fastest train between Patna and Delhi in both directions.

== History ==
The Rajendra Nagar–New Delhi Tejas Rajdhani Express (12309/12310) was introduced in the 1996–97 Railway Budget as a daily Rajdhani Express connecting Patna and New Delhi. The train commenced operations on 1 September 1996 and initially ran via Lucknow. It was later rerouted via Prayagraj (formerly Allahabad) to reduce travel time and improve operational efficiency.

In 1997, a dedicated pantry car was added to the train, enhancing onboard catering services for passengers.

Originally, the service operated between Patna Junction and New Delhi. Following the development of Rajendra Nagar Terminal, the train's originating and terminating station in Patna was shifted from Patna Junction to Rajendra Nagar Terminal to ease congestion at the city's primary railway station.

In 2009, the train became the only ISO-certified Rajdhani Express of Indian Railways, earning recognition for its service quality and operational standards.

On 1 September 2021, the train was upgraded with modern Tejas Sleeper LHB coaches, replacing the conventional Rajdhani rake. Following this upgrade, the service was officially rebranded as the Rajendra Nagar–New Delhi Tejas Rajdhani Express. The new coaches introduced several passenger amenities, including automatic doors, improved interiors, enhanced safety features, and modern onboard facilities.

The train remains one of the fastest and most prestigious rail services connecting Patna with New Delhi, covering a distance of approximately 1,001 kilometres in about 12 hours.

== Service ==
It runs daily. It operates as train number 12309 from Rajendra Nagar (Patna) to New Delhi railway station and as train number 12310 in the reverse direction. It covers a distance of 1001 km in each direction, however it takes 12 hours 5 minutes when operating as train number 12310 at an average speed of 83 km/h (including halts). While on its return journey, the train takes 12 h 30 min at an average speed of 80 km/h (including halts) as train number 12309.

It is the Fastest train of India to cover 1001 Km in just 12 hours and 20 min and the only Rajdhani Express to have an Iso-Certification.

Initially, the train used to operate between Patna Junction and New Delhi. However, with an increase in passenger pressure over Patna Junction, Indian Railways decided to construct a new satellite station to Patna Junction, in order to accommodate the growing passenger pressure. Later on with the completion of the construction of the Rajendra Nagar Terminal railway station, the Rajdhani Express was terminated from Patna Junction to here.

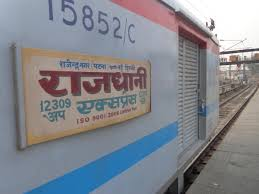
Patna Rajdhani Express in its LHB avatar.

It has 5 halts in either direction at Patna Junction, Danapur (*New Halt from 10/09/2025), PT Deen Dayal Upadhaya Junction, Subedarganj, Kanpur Central. This is the only Rajdhani Express that has ISO certification.

== Coach composition ==
The train is generally hauled by a locomotive and comprises 21 coaches in the following configuration:

- EOG – End-on Generator Car
- B1–B11 – AC Three Tier coaches
- A1–A5 – AC Two Tier coaches
- PC – Pantry Car
- H1–H2 – AC First Class coaches

== Traction ==
It is regularly hauled by a Gomoh Loco Shed or Samastipur Loco Shed-based WAP-7 electric locomotive on its entire journey.
