= 2016 Kanpur train accident =

Indian train, Sealdah Express (2016)

Details
- Date: 28 December 2016; 5:20 IST
- Location: Kanpur, Uttar Pradesh
- Country: India
- Incident type: Derailment
- Cause: Under investigation

Statistics
- Trains: 1
- Injured: More than 60 people

On 28 December 2016, the Ajmer–Sealdah Express 12987, a scheduled train from Ajmer to Sealdah, derailed near Kanpur, India.

15 coaches of the train derailed at a point about 50 kilometres (31 mi) from Kanpur. More than 60 people were injured.

On 10 November, 60 kilometres (37 mi) from Kanpur, 14 coaches of the Indore-Patna Express had derailed, killing 151 people. Both accidents were thought to have been caused by fractured tracks. In January 2017, after deliberately damaged track was found in time to avoid a third derailment, three suspects arrested for placing a bomb on rail tracks near Ghorasahan, Motilal Paswan, Umashankar Patel and Mukesh Yadav, were implicated in the two Kanpur derailments. They admitted working for Inter-Services Intelligence of Pakistan. According to a police officer, although no evidence of explosives had been found in connection with the two Kanpur derailments, audio recovered from one of the suspects' cellphones suggested they were involved in them. Brij Kishore Giri, a Nepalese suspected of being the men's handler, was arrested in Nepal, as was Shamsul Huda, suspected of masterminding the plot, after he had been deported from Dubai.
