= Pukhrayan train derailment =

2016 train accident in India

Pukhrayan Train Derailment
- Location within Uttar Pradesh Location within India

Details
- Date: 20 November 2016; 3:10 a.m. local time (21:40 UTC, 19 November)
- Location: Pukhrayan, Uttar Pradesh
- Coordinates: 26°13′50″N 79°50′54″E
- Country: India
- Line: Jhansi—Kanpur line
- Operator: Western Railway (train); North Central Railway (line)
- Owner: Indian Railways
- Service: Indore–Patna Express
- Incident type: Derailment
- Cause: Under investigation/Sabotage or terrorism ruled out

Statistics
- Trains: 1 (Indore Patna Express)
- Vehicles: WAP-4 locomotive
- Deaths: 150
- Injured: ≈150

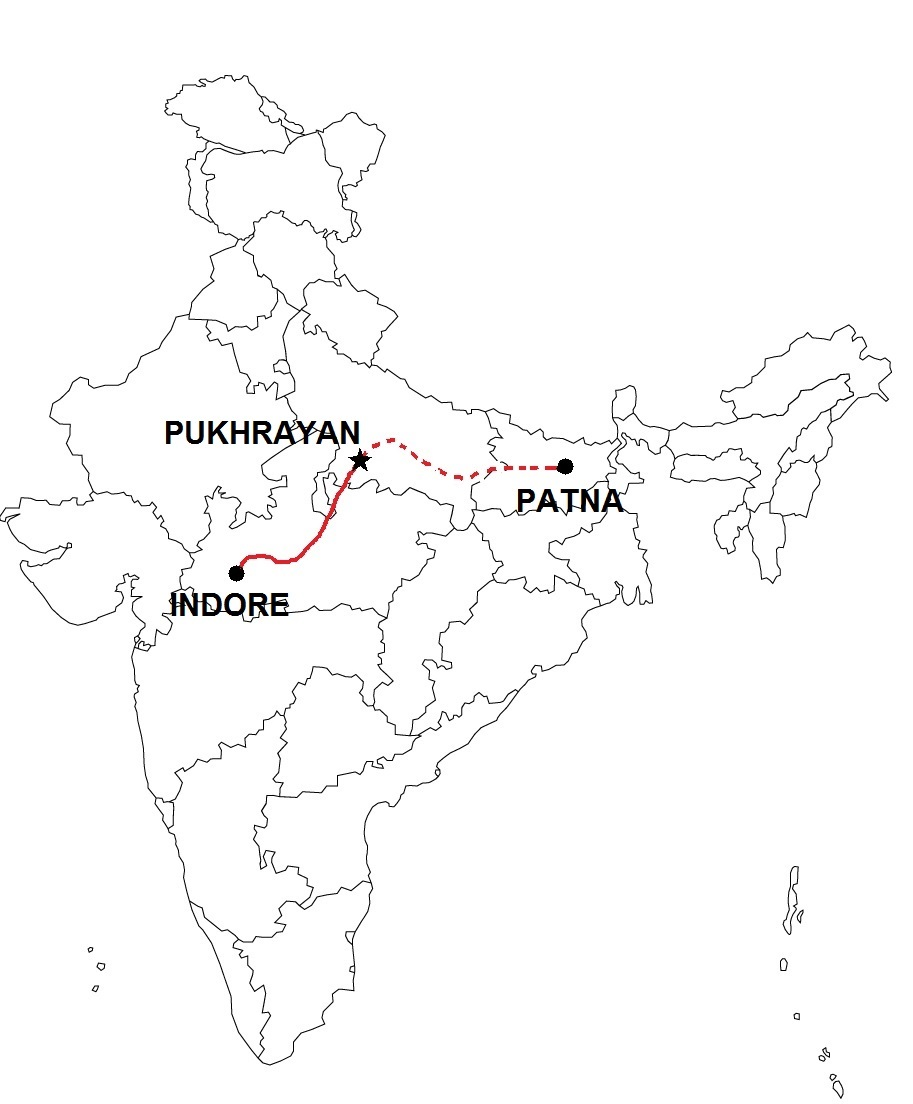
Scheduled train route from Indore to Patna.

On 20 November 2016, the Indore–Patna Express 19321, a scheduled train from Indore to Patna, derailed near Pukhrayan, Kanpur, India, resulting in the death of 150 passengers and injuries to at least another 150.

== Derailment ==
The Indore–Patna Express travels twice a week between Indore Junction railway station and Rajendra Nagar Terminal in Patna. At approximately 03:10 local time on 20 November 2016, the train derailed in the town of Pukhrayan near the city of Kanpur. Fourteen carriages derailed, killing 150 people and injuring 150 others.

Most of the casualties were from two severely damaged coaches, namely S1 and S2 of sleeper class, and heavy machinery was used to rescue passengers trapped in the train.

== Aftermath ==
The Indian Army, the National Disaster Response Force, and teams of doctors and local police carried out rescue operations. Rail mobile-medical units were also on site. Helpline numbers for those affected by the derailment were issued by Indian Railways.

Indian Prime Minister Narendra Modi said that he was "Anguished beyond words on the loss of lives due to the derailing of the Indore–Patna Express" and added that his "thoughts are with the bereaved families", in a tweet. The Railways Minister Suresh Prabhu tweeted, "Strictest possible action will be taken against those who could be responsible for accident".

== Compensation ==
As the rescue operation was underway, the Indian Railways, Prime Minister Narendra Modi and chief ministers across the states of Madhya Pradesh, Uttar Pradesh and Bihar announced ex-gratia payments for the victims of the accident. Earlier on 1 September 2016, the Indian Railways had launched an optional insurance scheme at a low premium.

Authority	Kin of the deceased	Critically injured	Survivors with minor injuries	Notes
Narendra Modi (Prime Minister of India)	₹2 lakh (US$2,077)	₹50,000 (US$519)	—	
Indian Railways	₹3.5 lakh (US$3,634)	₹50,000 (US$519)	₹25,000 (US$260)	
Akhilesh Yadav (Chief Minister of Uttar Pradesh)	₹5 lakh (US$5,192)	₹50,000 (US$519)	₹25,000 (US$260)	
Shivraj Singh Chouhan (Chief Minister of Madhya Pradesh)	₹2 lakh (US$2,077)	₹50,000 (US$519)	—	
Nitish Kumar (Chief Minister of Bihar)	₹2 lakh (US$2,077)	₹50,000 (US$519)	—	Compensation announced only for the residents of Bihar.

== Investigation ==
Within hours of the incident, the central government ordered an investigation into the cause. Some sources speculated the train to have been overcrowded; sources in the railways suspected rail fracture might have caused the train to skid off. Some survivors claimed that one of the coaches was making noise and that its wheels were not running smoothly.

Another train derailed on 28 December 2016, 50 kilometres (31 mi) from Kanpur. Both incidents were thought to have been caused by fractured tracks. In January 2017, after deliberately damaged track was found in time to avoid a third derailment, three suspects arrested for placing a bomb on rail tracks near Ghorasahan, Motilal Paswan, Umashankar Patel and Mukesh Yadav, were implicated in the two Kanpur derailments.

They admitted working for Inter-Services Intelligence of Pakistan. According to a police officer, although no evidence of explosives had been found in connection with the two Kanpur derailments, audio recovered from one of the suspects' cellphones suggested they were involved in them. Brij Kishore Giri, a Nepalese suspected of being the men's "handler", was arrested in Nepal, as was Shamsul Huda, suspected of masterminding the plot, after he had been deported from Dubai.

In October 2018, the National Investigation Agency (NIA) decided not to file a chargesheet for the case as there was no indication of any sabotage or explosion.

== See also ==
- 2016 Eséka train derailment, another deadly derailment a few weeks earlier
- List of deadliest rail accidents
- List of Indian rail incidents
