= Ziyarat Express =

Train in India

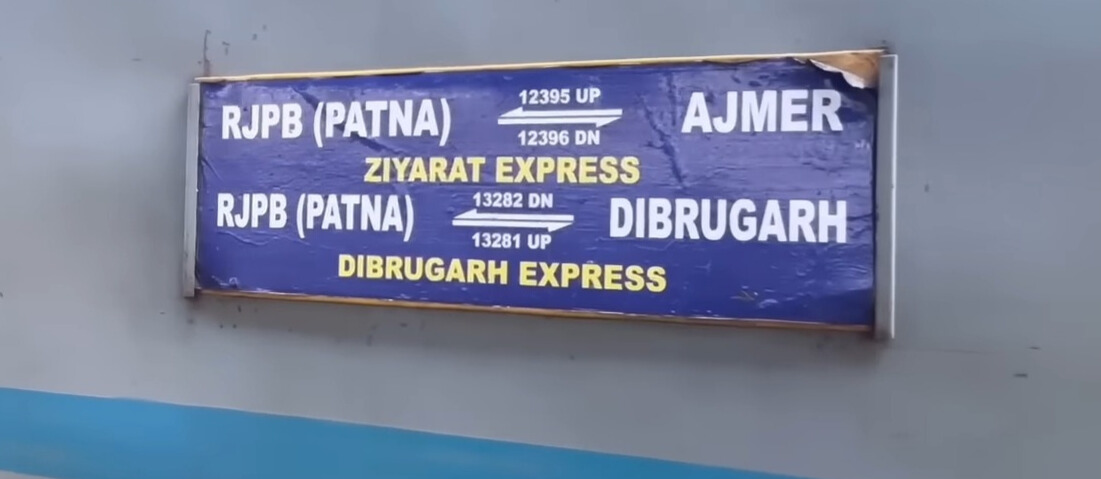
- Ziyarat Express train board.

Overview
- Service type: Superfast
- Locale: Bihar, Uttar Pradesh & Rajasthan
- Current operator: East Central Railways

Route
- Termini: Rajendra Nagar Terminal (RJPB); Ajmer Junction (AII)
- Stops: 13
- Distance travelled: 1,307 km (812 mi)
- Average journey time: 20 hours 25 minutes as 12395, 23 hours 10 minutes as 12396.
- Service frequency: Weekly
- Train number: 12395 / 12396

On-board services
- Classes: AC 2 tier, AC 3 tier, Sleeper Class, General Unreserved
- Seating arrangements: Yes
- Sleeping arrangements: Yes
- Catering facilities: Available
- Observation facilities: Large windows
- Baggage facilities: No

Technical
- Rolling stock: LHB coach
- Track gauge: 1,676 mm (5 ft 6 in)
- Operating speed: 130 km/h (81 mph) maximum, 63 km/h (39 mph) average including halts
Route map
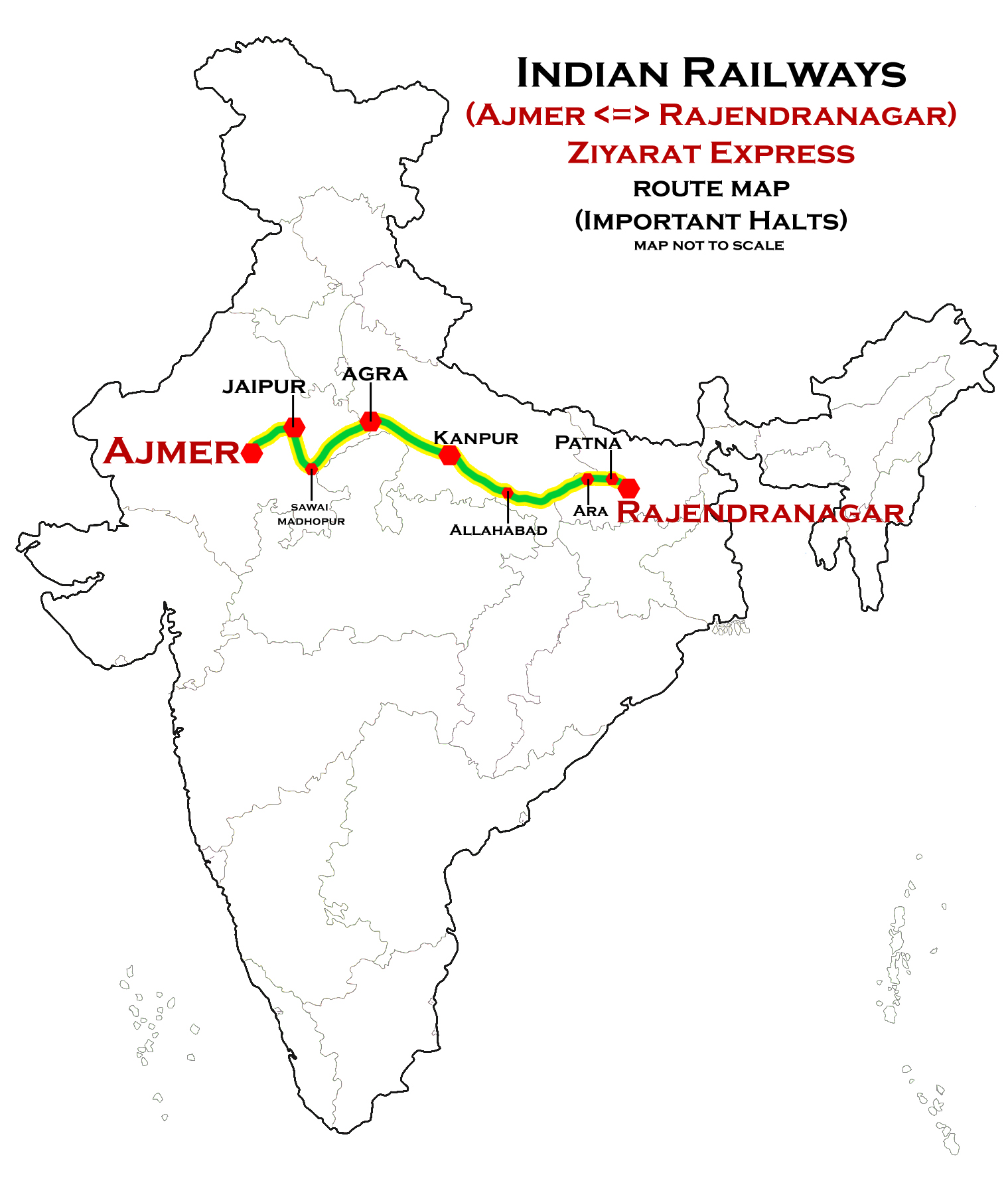

The 12395 / 12396 Ziyarat Express is a Superfast Express train belonging to Indian Railways – East Central Railway zone that runs between Rajendra Nagar Terminus and Ajmer Junction in India.

It operates as train number 12395 from Rajendra Nagar]to Ajmer Junction and as train number 12396 in the reverse direction serving the states of Bihar, Uttar Pradesh and Rajasthan.

The word Ziyarat means 'to visit' in Arabic.

== Coaches ==
The 12395 / 12396 Ziyarat Express has 2 AC 2 tier, 1 First AC, 6 AC 3 tier, 1 AC 3 tier Economy, 6 Sleeper Class, 3 General Unreserved and 2 EOG (End On Generator ) LHB coach. In addition, it carries a pantry car coach. It runs with LHB coach. As is customary with most train services in India, coach composition may be amended at the discretion of Indian Railways depending on demand.

== Service ==
The 12395 Ziyarat Express covers the distance of 1,305 km (811 mi) in 20 hours 25 mins (63.92 km/h) and in 23 hours 10 mins as 12396 Ziyarat Express (56.33 km/h).

As the average speed of the train is above 55 km/h (34 mph), as per Indian Railways rules, its fare includes a Superfast surcharge.

== Route and halts ==
The 12395 / 12396 Ziyarat Express runs from Rajendra Nagar Terminal via Patna Junction, Danapur, Ara Junction, Pt. Deen Dayal Upadhyaya Junction, Allahabad Junction, Kanpur Central, Firozabad, Tundla Junction, Agra Fort, Sawai Madhopur, Banasthali Niwai, Durgapura, Jaipur to Ajmer Junction.

== Traction ==
The entire route is now fully electrified. It is hauled by a Gomoh Loco Shed based WAP 7 electric locomotive powers the train from Rajendra Nagar Terminal up to Ajmer Junction.

== Operation ==
- 12395 – leaves Rajendra Nagar Terminal on every Wednesday at 18:30 Hrs IST and reaches Ajmer Junction next day at 15:10 hrs IST.
- 12396 – leaves Ajmer Jn every Thursday at 23:55 Hrs IST and reach Rajendra Nagar Terminal next day at 23:15 Hrs IST

== Rake sharing ==
The train sharing its rake with 13281/13282 Dibrugarh–Rajendra Nagar Weekly Express.
