= Bihar Movement =

Unsuccessful socio-political movement in 1974-1975 in Bihar, India

- Date: 18 March 1974 – 25 June 1975 (emergency)
- Location: Bihar, India
- Caused by: Corruption in public life
- Goals: Dissolution of Bihar legislative assembly
- Methods: Protest march, street protest, riot, hunger strike, strike
- Result: Did not succeed, emergency imposed

Parties
Janata Party	Indian National Congress	Bihar Sikshak Sangharsh Samiti; Bihar Chhatra Sangharsh Samiti

Lead figures
Jayprakash Narayan; Shyam Sunder Das	Indira Gandhi; Abdul Ghafoor	Satyendra Narayan Sinha; Karpuri Thakur

The Bihar movement, also known as the JP movement, was a political movement initiated by students in the Indian state of Bihar against misrule and corruption in the state government, in 1974. It was led by the veteran socialist Jayaprakash Narayan, popularly known as JP. The movement later turned against Indian Prime Minister Indira Gandhi's government in the central government. It was also referred to as Sampoorna Kranti (Total Revolution Movement).

== Early Protests ==
When the Nav Nirman movement resulted in the forced resignation of the Gujarat government, student protests had already begun in Bihar. Unlike the Nav Nirman movement, political student outfits like Akhil Bharatiya Vidyarthi Parishad (ABVP) connected with the Jana Sangh, Samajwadi Yuvajan Sabha (SYS) connected with Samajwadi Party, and Lok Dal took an active role in the JP movement. All India Students' Federation (AISF) connected with the CPI was also involved.

Opposition parties called a statewide strike from 1973. This resulted in police firing on strikers in Bhopal, the capital of Madhya Pradesh, causing the deaths of eight students on 17 August 1973 owing to their participation in the JP Movement. The Raina Enquiry Commission also confirm that the action of the then Congress Government in Madhya Pradesh was in excess and the Government had not handled the situation properly.

On 18 February 1974, the Patna University Students Union organized a convention which invited student leaders from the whole state. They formed Bihar Chhatra Sangharsh Samiti (BCSS) to spearhead the agitation. Lalu Prasad Yadav was chosen as a president. Among the several contemporary youth leaders were Sushil Kumar Modi, Narendra Singh, Bashistha Narain Singh, Chandradeo Prasad Verma, Md Shahabuddin & Ram Vilas Paswan. Their demands were related to education and food in hostels.

BCSS called for a gherao at Bihar Legislative Assembly during a budget session on 18 March 1974. They blocked all roads to the assembly and damaged government properties, including the telephone exchange and the residence of former education minister Ramanand Singh, which was set on fire.

Chief Minister Abdul Ghafoor convinced student leaders that he would look into demands. But students at colleges and universities kept protesting and damaging property. The killing of three students by police in Patna provoked student opposition across Bihar. BCSS declared a statewide strike on 23 March. Meanwhile, JP visited Gujarat to witness the Nav Nirman movement on 11 February and declared his intention to lead on 30 March 1974. BCSS approached JP to lead the agitation while JP was withdrawing himself from the Bhoodan movement. He agreed.

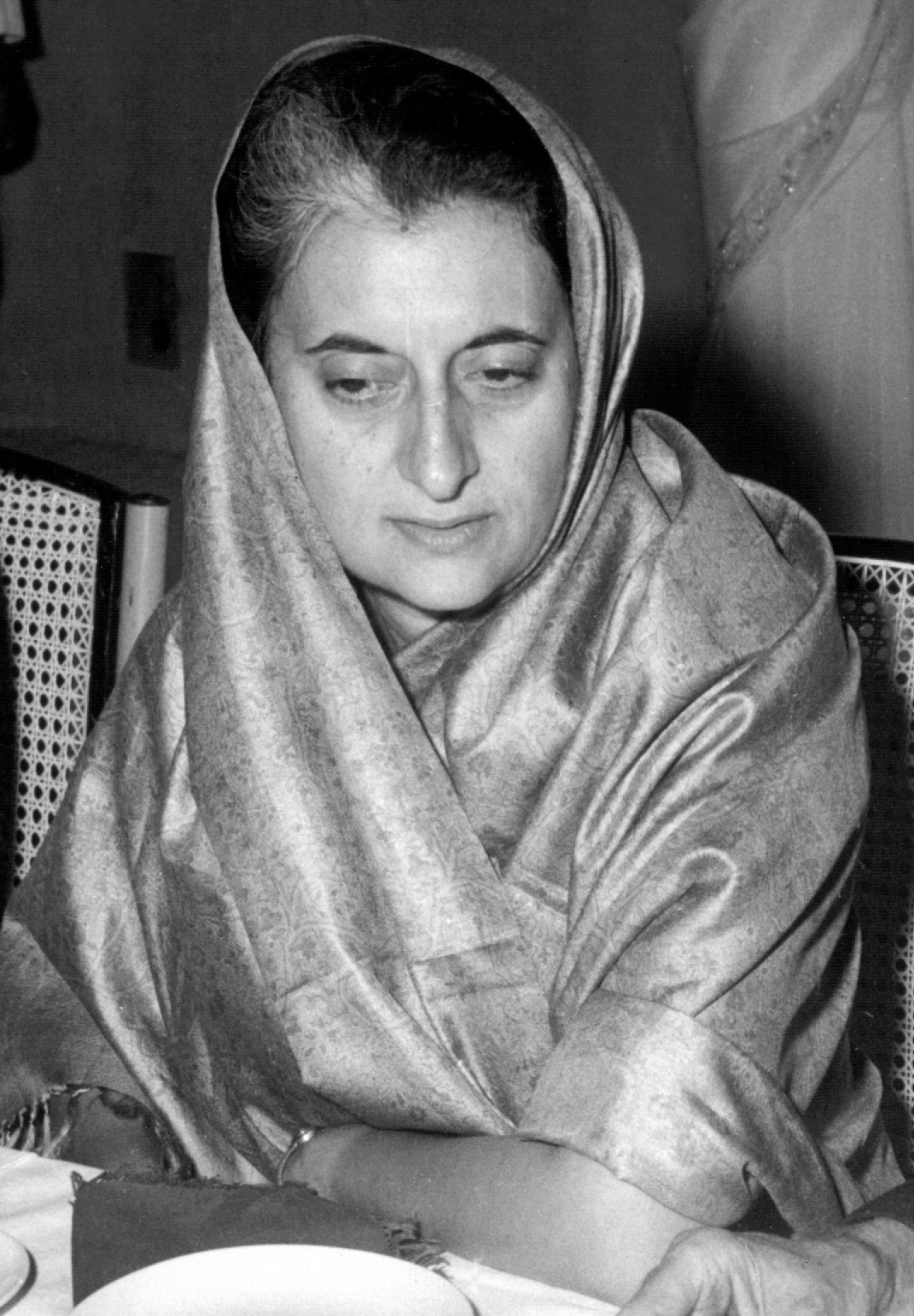
Indira Gandhi

On 1 April 1974, Indira Gandhi responded to the Bihar Movement's demands for the removal of the elected government. She asked, "How can such persons who continue to seek favours from the moneyed people ... dare to speak of corruption?" A silent student procession of 10,000 was held in Patna on 8 April. On 12 April, government opponents died in police firing at Gaya during the Paralyse the Government programme. Students also demanded dissolution of the Bihar Legislative Assembly. People demonstrated by blocking roads such as NH 31 and imposing a self-curfew. JP went to Delhi and attended a conference of Citizens for Democracy, an organization demanding civil rights, held on 13 and 14 April. During May 1974 various students' and peoples' organisations kept demanding dissolution of the assembly and also demanded the government's resignation, but did not succeed.

== Total Revolution ==
On 5 June, he told people at a Patna rally to organize a protest at the Bihar Legislative Assembly, which resulted in the arrest of 1,600 agitators and 65 student leaders by 1 July 1974. He advocated a program of social transformation by participation of youth in social activities. He called it Total Revolution (Sampurna Kranti) Movement. Protests and closure of colleges and universities also occurred on 15 July. Some colleges started after that and examinations were held. JP told students to boycott examinations but many students appeared in examinations. He called for a three-day statewide strike starting from 3 October and addressed a massive public gathering on 6 October.

Demanding the resignation of MLAs started on 4 November, much as the Nav Nirman movement had done, but 42 out of 318 MLAs had resigned before that, including 33 from opposition parties. Many MLAs refused to resign. Government tried hard to stop people from reaching Patna for the movement and also lathi charged people.

On 18 November, at a massive gathering at Patna, he spoke to the Congress government of Indira Gandhi. He realised the importance of fighting within the democratic system rather than a party-less democracy so he contacted opposition parties, which finally resulted in the formation of the Janata Party.

== End and aftermath ==
The Bihar Movement turned into a Satyagraha and volunteers kept protesting at the Bihar Legislative Assembly, inviting arrest starting on 4 December. Indira Gandhi did not change the Chief Minister of Bihar, Abdul Ghafoor, because she did not want to give in to protestors' calls for the dissolution of the assembly as she did in Gujarat. JP kept travelling all across India, strengthening and uniting opposition parties to defeat Congress. The election in Gujarat was delayed until Morarji Desai went on a hunger strike demanding it be held. The election was held on 10 June and the result was declared on 12 June 1975, with Congress losing. The same day(12 June 1975), the Allahabad High Court declared Indira Gandhi's election to the Lok Sabha in 1971 void on grounds of electoral malpractice. The court thus ordered her to be removed from her seat in Parliament and banned from running in elections for six years. It effectively removed her from the Prime Minister's office. She rejected calls to resign and went to the Supreme Court. She recommended President V. V. Giri to appoint A. N. Ray as a Chief Justice to get a favourable outcome in the case. JP opposed such a movement in his letters to Indira Gandhi and called for her to resign.

She imposed a nationwide Emergency to safeguard her position on the night of 25 June 1975. Immediately after proclamation of emergency, prominent opposition political leaders Jayaprakash Narayan & Satyendra Narayan Sinha were arrested without any prior notice, so were dissenting members of her own party. JP was held in custody at Chandigarh even after he had asked for a month's parole for mobilising relief in areas of Bihar gravely affected by flooding. His health suddenly deteriorated on 24 October, and he was released on 12 November; diagnosis at Jaslok Hospital, Bombay, revealed kidney failure; he would be on dialysis for the rest of his life.

After Indira Gandhi revoked the Emergency on 21 March 1977 and announced elections, it was under JP's guidance that the Janata Party (a vehicle for the broad spectrum of the anti-Indira Gandhi opposition) was formed. Considered to be an election of newcomers, a huge crowd of youth activists and leaders used to gather before the residence of the Bihar Janta party president Satyendra Narayan Sinha. The Janata Party was voted into power, and became the first non-Congress party to form a government at the Centre in India. In Bihar, after the Janata Party came to power, Karpuri Thakur won the chief ministership battle from the then Bihar Janata Party President Satyendra Narayan Sinha to become the Bihar Chief Minister in 1977.

== Educational disruption ==
During the movement, academic operations at universities and colleges throughout Bihar were severely disrupted, sometimes for months at a time. Student activism began at Patna University, and the demonstrations soon extended to Bhagalpur University, Ranchi University, and Magadh University.

Student strikes became frequent after the Bihar Chhatra Sangharsh Samiti was established in February 1974. The Bihar Legislative Assembly's gherao on March 18 signaled a significant escalation, and many educational institutions were used more as gathering places for protests than as centers for instruction. Academic calendars were thrown into disarray as most colleges and universities suspended classes indefinitely.

JP urged students to keep skipping classes after taking over as leader in April 1974. When colleges and universities closed once more on July 15, the movement reached yet another high point. While some schools attempted to reopen and set up exams, JP urged students to abstain. Thousands of students were forced to choose between their academic futures and their political commitments as a result. While some chose to show up in spite of the boycott call, many chose not to take exams, jeopardizing their academic progress.

Active participants in the movement frequently lost whole academic years. Some had to retake years or semesters of coursework. Incoming students were also impacted by the disruption, as they discovered institutions in disarray, faculty members were unsure of their roles, and research was halted.

Institutions gradually reopened under strict security after the Emergency was declared on June 25, 1975. Political activity on campus was monitored and subject to restrictions. For many institutions, the 1974 academic year continued into 1975 and beyond.

Long after the movement ended, the effects persisted. Many of the students in this generation never finished their degrees because their education was interrupted. Additionally, the movement created a campus political activism culture that persisted for decades, sometimes at the expense of academic priorities. Although the movement was only one of many factors affecting higher education in the state, Bihar's once-respected universities saw a decline in their academic reputation in later years.

Some student leaders saw the disruption as a chance as well as a sacrifice. Even though many lost years in school, the political experience was beneficial. After leading the Bihar Chhatra Sangharsh Samiti, Lalu Prasad Yadav rose to prominence in Bihar politics. For these individuals, the movement offered an alternative form of education in organising and mass politics that influenced their careers more than formal academic credentials might have.

== Commemoration ==
On 17 February 2002, Sampoorna Kranti Express, named in recognition of the Bihar Movement, started its service between Rajendra Nagar Terminal in Patna and New Delhi. It is one of the fastest train services in India, traversing a distance of 1001 kilometres in under 12 hours, with an average speed of nearly 82 Kmph .
