= Rajendra Nagar Terminal railway station =

Railway station in Patna, Bihar, India

RAJENDRA NAGAR TERMINAL

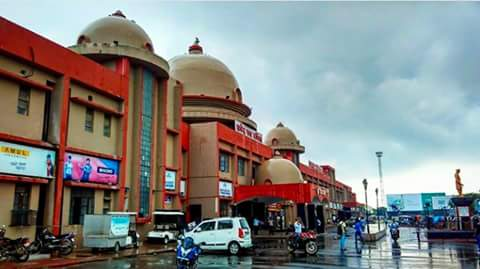
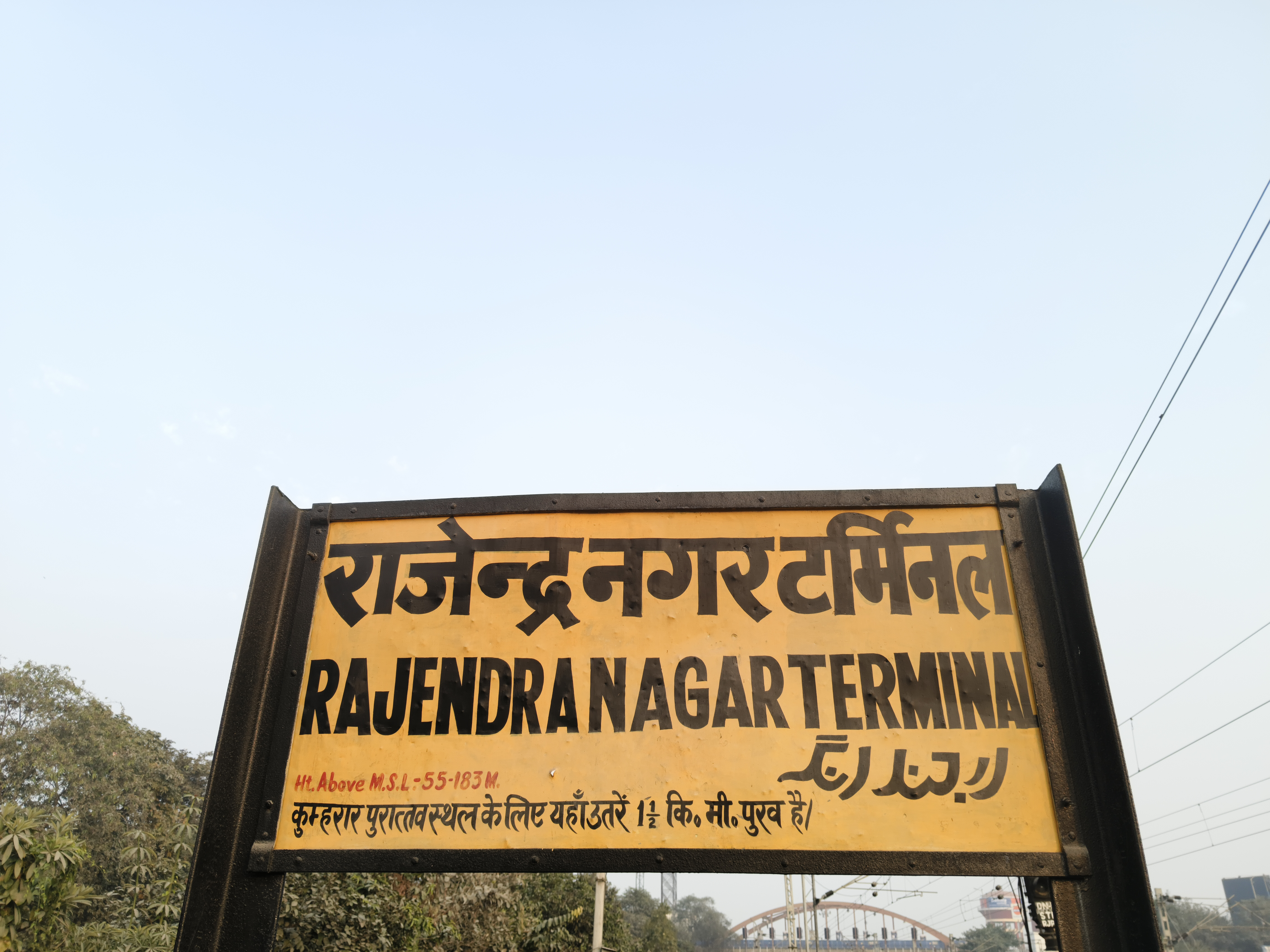
- Rajendra Nagar Terminal railway station

General information
- Location: Rajendra Nagar, Patna, Bihar; India
- Coordinates: 25°36′11″N 85°9′44″E
- Elevation: 55.183 metres (181.05 ft)
- System: Indian Railways station
- Owner: Indian Railways
- Operator: East Central Railway
- Lines: Howrah–Delhi main line Asansol–Patna section
- Platforms: 4 platforms Length– 600 m (2,000 ft)
- Connections: Blue Line Rajendra Nagar (under-construction)

Construction
- Structure type: Standard
- Parking: Available

Other information
- Status: Functional
- Station code: RJPB
- Zone(s): East Central Railway zone
- Division(s): Danapur

History
- Opened: March 2003; 23 years ago
- Electrified: 2003–2004
Services
Preceding station	Indian Railways	Following station
East Central Railway
Patna Junction towards ?	Asansol–Patna section Towards Islampur, Bihar Sharif	Gulzarbagh towards ?
Route map
Location
- Location within Patna
- Interactive map of Rajendra Nagar Terminal

Rajendra Nagar Terminal, (Station code: RJPB), is a railway station serving the capital city of Patna in the Indian state of Bihar. It is located in Rajendra Nagar in Patna and is in the Danapur railway division of the East Central Railway zone of the Indian Railways. The city is a major railway hub and has five major stations: Rajendranagar Terminal, Patna Junction, Danapur, Patliputra Junction and Patna Sahib. Some famous trains departs from here Rajendranagar–Banka Intercity Superfast Express, Patna Tejas Rajdhani Express, Sampoorna Kranti SF Express, etc.

== History ==
It was developed as an alternative railway station as part of measures to decongest Patna Junction railway station. Many trains such as New Delhi–Rajendra Nagar Rajendra Nagar Patna Rajdhani Express, Indore–Patna Express, Indore–Rajendra Nagar via Faizabad Express, Sampoorna Kranti Express, South Bihar Express, etc. originate from here.

It was inaugurated on 31 March 2003 as a full-fledged station. Built at a cost of ₹8.61 crore (US$920,000), this terminus developed as an alternative to Patna Junction, has all modern facilities for the passengers. Its main entrance is opposite the College of Commerce, Patna.

Lalu Prasad Yadav, then Union Railway Minister, also flagged off the first stainless steel fully covered wagons (BCNHL) train from Rajendra Nagar Terminal. He also unveiled a statue of Dr Rajendra Prasad at Rajendra Nagar Terminal after whom this station has been named.

== Originate trains ==
The train which originates from Rajendra Nagar Terminal are :

● Sampoorna Kranti Express

● Rajendra Nagar Terminal–New Delhi Amrit Bharat Express

● Rajendra Nagar–New Delhi Tejas Rajdhani Express

● Howrah–Rajendra Nagar Express

● Ziyarat Express

● Dibrugarh–Rajendra Nagar Weekly Express

● Saharsa–Rajendra Nagar Terminal Intercity Express
