= Indore–Patna Express =

Train in India

Overview
- Service type: Express
- Locale: Madhya Pradesh, Uttar Pradesh, Bihar
- First service: 1995
- Current operator: Western Railway

Route
- Termini: Indore Junction; Patna Junction
- Stops: 12
- Distance travelled: 1,772 km (1,101 mi)
- Average journey time: 26.5 hours
- Service frequency: Weekly

On-board services
- Classes: AC 1 Tier, AC 2 Tier, AC 3 Tier, Sleeper 3 Tier, Unreserved
- Seating arrangements: Yes
- Sleeping arrangements: Yes

Technical
- Operating speed: 66 km/h (41 mph) average with halts
- Timetable number: 19313 / 19321
Route map
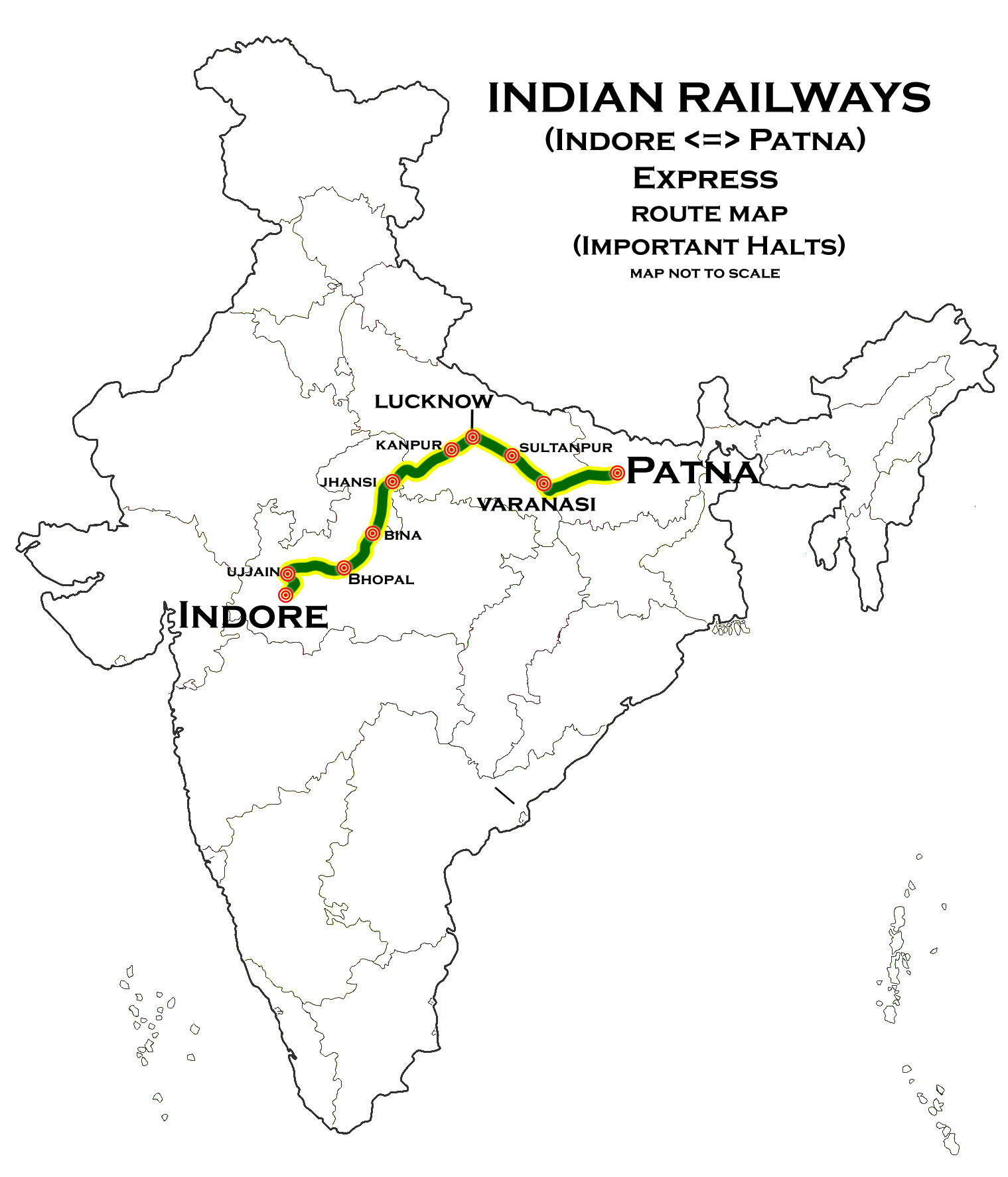

The Indore–Patna Express is an Express Train of the Indian Railways, which runs between Indore Junction railway station of Indore, the largest city and commercial hub of Central Indian state Madhya Pradesh and Patna Junction, railway station of Patna, the capital city of Bihar. As of April 2017 there are two regular trains linking Indore with Patna; they are numbered 19313 and 19321. At November 2016 the train ran twice a week with one of these two services routed via Lalitpur and Sultanpur, both in Uttar Pradesh.

== Trains 19313 and 19314 ==
=== Arrival and departure ===
Train no.19313 departs from Indore every at Wednesday at 14:00 hrs. from platform no.5 reaching Patna Junction the next day at 16:00 hrs. Train no.19314 departs from Patna, every Thursday at 17:20 hrs., reaching Indore the next day at 12:30 hrs.

=== Route and halts ===
The train goes via Bhopal and Sultanpur. The important halts of the train are:

- INDORE JUNCTION
- Dewas
- Ujjain Junction
- Shujalpur
- Sant Hirdaram Nagar
- Bina Junction
- Jhansi Junction
- Orai
- Kanpur Central
- Lucknow
- Varanasi Junction
- Pt. Deen Dayal Upadhyaya Junction
- Buxar
- PATNA JUNCTION

=== Coach composite ===
The train consists of 22 coaches :

- 2 AC II Tier
- 2 AC III Tier
- 12 Sleeper Coaches
- 4 Unreserved
- 1 Ladies/Handicapped
- 1 Luggage/Brake van

=== Average speed and frequency ===
The train runs with an average speed of 63 km/h. The train runs on Weekly basis.

== Trains 19321 and 19322 ==
Indore - Rajendra Nagar Express
Overview
- Service type: Express
- Locale: Madhya Pradesh, Uttar Pradesh, Bihar
- First service: Bhopal - Varanasi Express
- Last service: Bhopal - Patna Express
- Current operator: Western Railway

Route
- Termini: Indore Junction; Rajendra Nagar
- Distance travelled: 1,772 km (1,101 mi)
- Average journey time: 28 hours
- Service frequency: Weekly
- Train number: 19321 / 19322

On-board services
- Classes: AC 1 Tier, AC 2 Tier, AC 3 Tier, Sleeper 3 Tier, Unreserved
- Seating arrangements: Yes
- Sleeping arrangements: Yes
- Observation facilities: Windows in all carriages

Technical
- Track gauge: 1,676 mm (5 ft 6 in)
- Operating speed: 60 km/h (37 mph)

The Indore – Rajendra Nagar (Via. Faizabad) Express is a Weekly Express train of the Indian Railways, which runs between Indore Junction, Madhya Pradesh and Rajendra Nagar, Patna, Bihar.

=== Arrival and departure ===
The train runs with an average speed of 63 km/h. The train runs on a weekly basis.

Train no.19321 departs from Indore every Saturday at 14:00 hrs. from platform no.5 reaching Rajendra Nagar Bihar the next day at 16:45 hrs. Train no.19322 departs from Rajendra Nagar every Sunday at 20:20 hrs., reaching Indore the next day at 13:30 hrs.

=== Route and halts ===
The train goes via Ujjain & Lucknow. The important halts of the train are :

- Indore Junction
- Dewas
- Ujjain Junction
- Shujalpur
- Sant Hirdaram Nagar
- Bhopal Junction
- Bina Junction
- Jhansi Junction
- Orai
- Kanpur Central
- Lucknow
- Akbarpur
- Faizabad Junction
- Ayodhya
- Jaunpur Junction
- Varanasi Junction
- Pt. Deen Dayal Upadhyaya Junction
- Patna Junction
- Rajendra Nagar Terminal

=== Equipment ===
The train is hauled by Ratlam RTM WDM-3 Diesel engine. The train consists of 23 Coaches :

- 1 AC I Tier
- 2 AC II Tier
- 2 AC III Tier
- 12 Sleeper Coaches
- 4 Un Reserved
- 1 Ladies/Handicapped
- 1 Luggage/Brake Van

The train was maintained by the Indore Coaching Depot. The same rake is used for Indore - Patna Express, Indore - Pune Express, Indore - Nagpur Express and Shipra Express for one way which is altered by the second rake on the other way. Much of this equipment was destroyed in the Pukhrayan train derailment.

== Accidents and incidents ==
On 20 November 2016, fourteen coaches of the train no. 19321 derailed near Kanpur, killing 150 passengers with about 300 being injured.

== See also ==
- Indore Express
- Indore Junction
- Bhopal Junction
