= Diesel Loco Shed, Samastipur =

Loco shed in Bihar, India

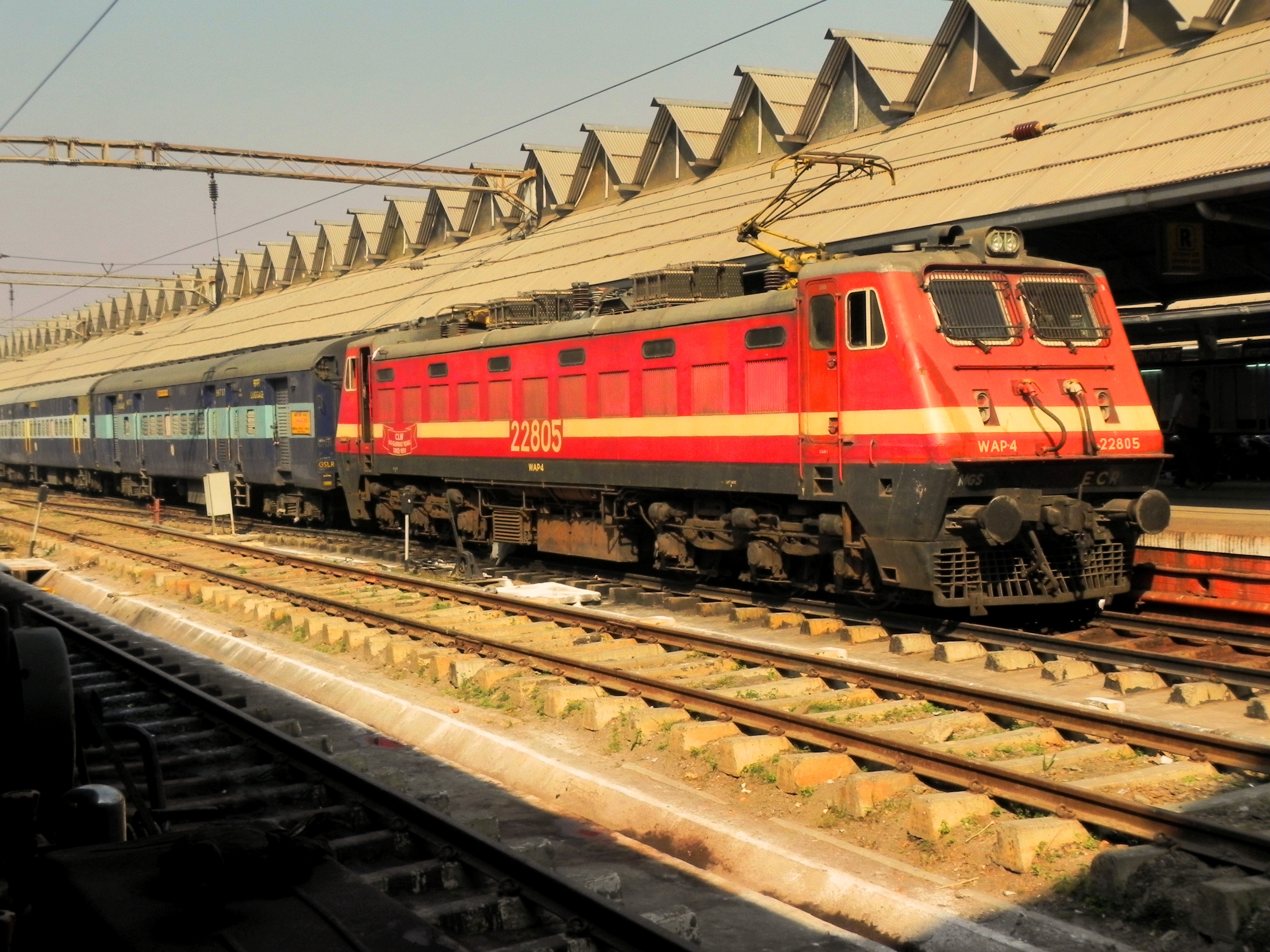
- Samastipur based WAP-4 (ex. MGS) at Howrah.

- Location within Bihar

Location
- Location: Samastipur, Bihar
- Coordinates: 25.8495006°N 85.7942614°E

Characteristics
- Owner: Indian Railways
- Operator: East Central Railway zone
- Depot code: SPJ
- Type: Engine shed
- Roads: 6
- Rolling stock: WDG-3A; WDM-3D; WAP-4; WAP-7

History
- Opened: 15 June 2001; 25 years ago
- Former rolling stock: WDM-2; WDM-3A; WAG-7

Diesel Loco Shed, Samastipur is an engine shed located in Samastipur, in the Indian state of Bihar. Located east of Samastipur Junction, it falls under the Samastipur railway division. It is the smallest of the three locomotive sheds in the East Central Railway zone. It is exceeded by Pandit Deen Dayal Upadhyaya Junction and Netaji Subhas Chandra Bose Gomoh, the two largest in the country.

== History ==
The Railway Board sanctioned construction of Diesel Loco Shed, Samastipur in the year 1996–97. Construction began in 1999. The initial holding capacity was 20 locomotives, which were transferred from the Diesel Loco shed, Gonda.

== Continuation ==
Major and minor maintenance schedules of locomotives are carried out. The shed is ISO 9001:2000, ISO 14001:2004 and OHSAS 18001:2007 certified as or 2009. The shed is divided into Light Schedule Repair Section, Heavy Schedule Repair Section, Heavy Repair (Mechanical), Heavy Repair (Electrical), Bogie Section, Machine Shop and Training Centre.

== Locomotives ==
Serial No.	Locomotive Class	Horsepower	Quantity
1.	WDG-3A	3100	22
2.	WDM-3D	3300	37
3.	WAP-4	5350	73
4.	WAP-7	6350	71
Total locomotives active as of June 2026			203
