= Electric Loco Shed, Gomoh =

Loco shed in Jharkhand, India

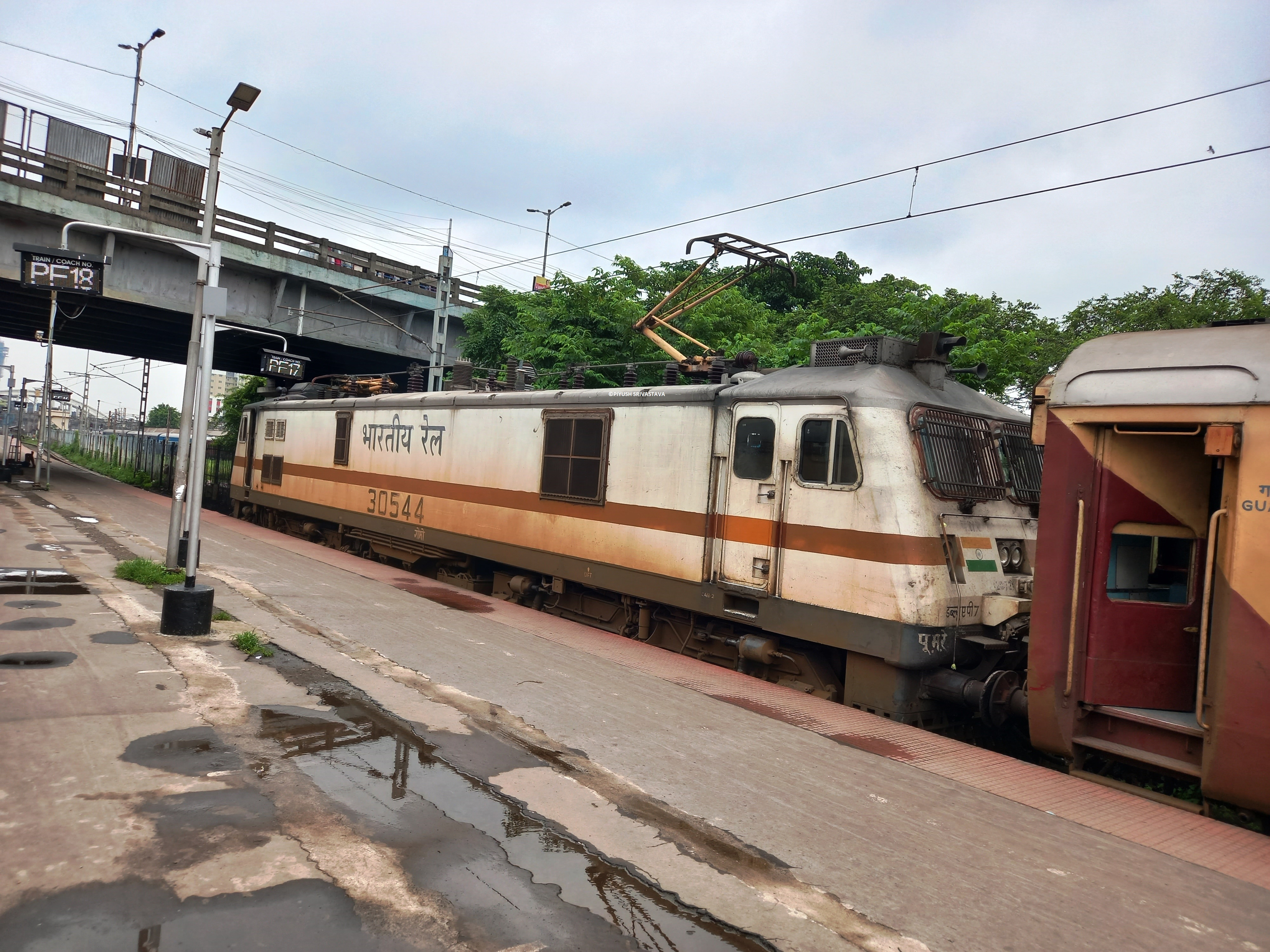
- GMO based WAP-7 hauling Howrah - Ranchi Intercity Express.

- Location within Jharkhand

Location
- Location: Gomoh, Jharkhand
- Coordinates: 23°52′24″N 86°08′53″E

Characteristics
- Owner: Indian Railways
- Operator: East Central Railways
- Depot code: GMO
- Type: Engine shed
- Rolling stock: WAP-5; WAP-7; WAG-9

History
- Opened: 1965; 61 years ago
- Former rolling stock: WAG-7

Electric Loco Shed, Gomoh is a motive power depot performing locomotive maintenance and repair facility for electric locomotives of the Indian Railways, located at Gomoh of the East Central Railway zone in Jharkhand, India.

== Locomotives ==
Serial No.	Locomotive Class	Horsepower	Quantity
1.	WAP-5	6120	6
2.	WAP-7	6350	55
3.	WAG-9	6120	220
Total locomotives active as of November 2026			281
