= State Highway 93 (Bihar) =

Road in Bihar, India

State Highway 93
- Mahnar Road

Route information
- Maintained by Bihar State Road Development Corporation (BSRDC)
- Length: 76.30 km (47.41 mi)

Major junctions
- West end: Hajipur (Vaishali district)
- East end: NH-122, Bachhwara (Begusarai district)

Location
- Country: India
- State: Bihar

Highway system
- Roads in India; Expressways; National; State; Asian; State Highways in Bihar

State Highway 93 (SH-93) is a state highway in Bihar State. This state highway passes through three major districts (Vaishali district, Samastipur district and Begusarai District).

== Route ==
The route of SH-93 from west to east is as follows:

- Jadhua (Hajipur)
- Bidupur
- Mahnar
- Mohiuddinagar
- Vidyapati Dham railway station
- Bachhwara (Begusarai)

Note: from Bechhwara, NH-122 move north towards Dalsingh Sarai and south towards Barauni and Begusarai.
