= Jagan Nath Prasad Rai =

Indian politician

MLA, Bihar Legislative Assembly
- In office 1977–1985
- Preceded by: Motilal Sinha Kanan
- Succeeded by: Motilal Sinha Kanan
- Constituency: Hajipur
- In office 1990–1995
- Preceded by: Motilal Sinha Kanan
- Succeeded by: Rajendra Rai
- Constituency: Hajipur

Personal details
- Born: Majhauli, Bidupur, Hajipur, Bihar
- Died: 25 April 2021 IGIMS, Patna, Bihar
- Party: Janata Party; Indian National Congress
- Occupation: Politician

Jagan Nath Prasad Rai also known as J N Rai was an Indian politician. He was elected as a member of Bihar Legislative Assembly from Hajipur constituency in Vaishali district.

== Death ==
Rai died on 25 April 2021. He contested his last election in 2015 as an Indian National Congress candidate but lost to Awadhesh Singh.

== See also ==
- Hajipur Assembly constituency
