= Dighikala East =

Dighi Kala East
- Gram Panchayat
- Location in Bihar, India Dighi Kala East (India)
- Coordinates: 25°40′48.0″N 85°13′12.0″E
- Country: India
- State: Bihar
- District: vaishali
- Assembly Constituency: hajipur assembly constituency (AC.123)

Languages
  - Official: Hindi
- Time zone: UTC+5:30 (IST)
- ISO 3166 code: IN-BR

Dighikala East is a Gram panchayat in Hajipur, Vaishali district, Bihar. Dighikala East is a village (Now it has become a part of Hajipur Nagar Parishad.) in Hajipur block and located towards west from district headquarters Hajipur. It is 13 km from state capital Patna. Hajipur, Sonepur, Patna, are the nearby cities to Dighikala East. This place is in the border of the Vaishali District and Saran District. Saran District (Sonepur) is west towards this place.

== Geography ==
This panchayat is located at 25°40′48.0″N 85°13′12.0″E

== Nearest city/town ==
Hajipur (Distance 3 km)

== Nearest major road highway or river ==
NH 19 (National highway 19), NH 77, SH 49 ( state highway 49) And Railway line

== Villages in panchayat ==
The following villages are in this panchayat

s.n	villages
1	Dighi Kalan
2	Yusufpur Dighikhurd
