= National Highway 122B (India) =

National highway in India

Route information
- Length: 54.96 km (34.15 mi)

Major junctions
- West end: Hajipur (Vaishali)
- East end: Bachwara (Begusarai)

Location
- Country: India
- States: Bihar

Highway system
- Roads in India; Expressways; National; State; Asian

National Highway 122B, commonly called NH 122B, is a national highway in the state of Bihar in India. The NH-122B connects NH-22 at Jadhua near Hajipur in Vaishali district to NH-122 at Bachwara in Begusarai district. NH-122B is a secondary route of National Highway 22.

== Route ==
NH-122B passes through following towns from west to east direction:

- Jadhua (Hajipur)
- Bidupur
- Gandhi Chowk (Desari)
- Mahnar
- Mohanpur Block
- Mohiuddinagar
- Vidyapatidham railway station
- Bachwara (Begusarai)

== See also ==
- List of national highways in India
