= Ararah =

- Gram Panchayat
- Location in Bihar, India Ararah (India)
- Coordinates: 25°46′37.1″N 85°13′23.1″E
- Country: India
- State: Bihar
- District: vaishali
- Assembly Constituency: hajipur assembly constituency (AC.123)

Languages
  - Official: Hindi
- Time zone: UTC+5:30 (IST)
- ISO 3166 code: IN-BR

Ararah is a Gram panchayat in Hajipur in the Vaishali district, state of Bihar, India.

== Geography ==
This panchayat is located at 25°46′37.1″N 85°13′23.1″E

== panchayat office ==
panchayat bhawan ararah (पंचायत भवन ararah )

== Nearest City/Town ==
Hajipur (Distance 4 km)

== Nearest major road highway or river ==
State highway 74 ( nearest state highway ) And Other roadway

== Villages in panchayat ==
There are villages in this panchayat
