= Bishunpur Basant =

- Gram Panchayat
- Location in Bihar, India
- Coordinates: 25°42′47.6″N 85°15′33.5″E
- Country: India
- State: Bihar
- District: vaishali
- Assembly Constituency: hajipur assembly constituency (AC.123)

Languages
  - Official: Hindi
- Time zone: UTC+5:30 (IST)
- ISO 3166 code: IN-BR

Bishunpur Basant is a Gram panchayat in hajipur, vaishali district, bihar.

== Geography ==
This panchayat is located at 25°42′47.6″N 85°15′33.5″E

== Nearest City/Town ==
Hajipur (Distance KM)

== Nearest major road highway or river ==
SH 49 ( state highway 49)

== Villages in panchayat ==
The following villages are in this panchayat:

s.n	villages
1	Bishunpur Basant urf Suhai
2	Saidpur Parsuram urf Jagdispur
3	Chak Saheb
4	Bishunpur Titidha
5	Chakyari
