= Chakunda Urf Milki =

Chakunda urf milki
- Gram Panchayat
- Location in Bihar, India Chakunda urf milki (India)
- Coordinates: 25°44′01.1″N 85°17′48.5″E
- Country: India
- State: Bihar
- District: vaishali
- Assembly Constituency: hajipur assembly constituency (AC.123)

Languages
  - Official: Hindi
- Time zone: UTC+5:30 (IST)
- ISO 3166 code: IN-BR

Chakunda urf milki is a Gram panchayat in hajipur, vaishali district, bihar.

Chakunda Urf Milki is surrounded by Rajapakar Block towards East, Sonepur Block towards west, Bidupur Block towards East, Bhagwanpur Block towards North .

== Geography ==
This panchayat is located at 25°44′01.1″N 85°17′48.5″E

== Panchayat office ==
samudayik bhawan chakunda urf milki (समुदाियक भवन chakunda urf milki )

== Nearest city or town ==
Hajipur (Distance 15 km)

patna (Distance 22 km)

== Nearest major road highway or river ==
roadway (milki rd)

NH31

NH922

Ganges in the nearest river .

== Villages in panchayat ==
There are villages in this panchayat

s.n	villages
1	Chak Said Kari
2	Kansara
3	Basauli
4	Chak Khunda urf Milki
5	Chak Khunda urf Milik Chak
6	Bejha
7	Loawan urf Loma
8	Bishunpur Ram
9	Sopha
10	Gumti
11	Az Rakbe Gumti
