= Kernpura =

- Gram Panchayat
- Location in Bihar, India Kernpura (India)
- Coordinates: 25°39′53.0″N 85°14′35.3″E
- Country: India
- State: Bihar
- District: Vaishali
- Assembly Constituency: Hajipur Assembly constituency (AC.123)

Languages
  - Official: Hindi
- Time zone: UTC+5:30 (IST)
- ISO 3166 code: IN-BR

Kernpura is a Gram panchayat in Hajipur, Vaishali District, Bihar.

== Geography ==
This panchayat is located at 25°39′53.0″N 85°14′35.3″E

== Nearest City/Town ==
Hajipur (Distance KM)

== Nearest major road highway or river ==
NH 19 (National highway 19 )

== Villages in panchayat ==
There are villages in this panchayat

s.n	villages
1	Chak Jalal
2	Saifpur
3	Jairam Chak
4	Karanpur
5	Chak Mahmud Chisti
6	Karanpur
7	Sherpur
8	Nawada Khurd
9	Nawada Kalan
10	Bahadurpur
11	Sadullahpur satan
12	saidpur Ganesh
13	Saidpur Ganesh
14	Mohanpur Ishar Chak Khusro
15	Nawada Khurd
16	Chandni Sadullahpur Satan
17	Rampur Nausahan
