= Daulatpur Dewaria =

Daulat Pur Dewaria
- Gram Panchayat
- Location in Bihar, India Daulat Pur Dewaria (India)
- Coordinates: 25°43′44.1″N 85°14′33.0″E
- Country: India
- State: Bihar
- District: vaishali
- Assembly Constituency: Hajipur assembly constituency (AC.123)

Languages
  - Official: Hindi
- Time zone: UTC+5:30 (IST)
- ISO 3166 code: IN-BR

Daulat Pur Dewaria is a Gram Panchayat in Hajipur, Vaishali District, Bihar, India.

== Geography ==
This panchayat is located at 25°43′44.1″N 85°14′33.0″E

== Nearest city or town ==
Hajipur (Distance 8 km)

== Nearest major road highway or river ==
NH 77 (National highway 77)

== Villages in panchayat ==
There are villages in this panchayat

s.n	villages
1	Gurmain
2	Saidpur Rajauli
3	Harpur Rajauli urf Hariharpur
4	Hariharpur ShankarAzRakbe urf
5	Pranpur Berai
6	Daulatpur Deoria urf Daulatpur
7	Sharifabad
