= Vishunpur Vasant Urf Shubhai =

Vishunpur vasant urf shubhai
- Gram Panchayat
- Location in Bihar, India Vishunpur vasant urf shubhai (India)
- Coordinates: 25°40′48.0″N 85°13′12.0″E
- Country: India
- State: Bihar
- District: vaishali
- Assembly Constituency: hajipur assembly constituency (AC.123)

Languages
  - Official: Hindi
- Time zone: UTC+5:30 (IST)
- ISO 3166 code: IN-BR

Vishunpur vasant is a Gram panchayat in hajipur, vaishali district, bihar.

== Geography ==
This panchayat is located at 25°40′48.0″N 85°13′12.0″E

== Panchayat office ==
samudayik bhawan Mansingpur Rajauli

== Nearest City/Town ==
Hajipur (Distance KM)

== Nearest major road highway or river ==
other roadway railway line

== Villages in panchayat ==
There are villages in this panchayat

s.n	villages
1	Chak Bhojmanjari Shabuddin
2	Sisauni Rajauli
3	Mansingpur Rajauli
4	Chak Saidpur Rajauli
5	Majirabad Suhai
6	Saidpur Jhirua
7	Jhirua Dih
8	Jhirua Mal
9	Bishunpur Basant urf Suhai
