= National Highway 19 (India, old numbering) =

Old numbering of road in India

National Highway 19
- Map of Old NH 19 in red

Route information
- Length: 240 km (150 mi)

Major junctions
- West end: Ghazipur, Uttar Pradesh
- East end: Patna, Bihar

Location
- Country: India
- States: Bihar: 120 km (75 mi); Uttar Pradesh: 120 km (75 mi)
- Primary destinations: Ghazipur - Balia – Manjhi – Chhapra - Sonpur - Hajipur - Patna

Highway system
- Roads in India; Expressways; National; State; Asian
← NH 18	→ NH 20

National Highway 19 or NH 19, (currently known as NH 31), is a National Highway in India that links Ghazipur in Uttar Pradesh with Patna in Bihar. This 240 km (150 mi)-long route passes through Ballia, Chhapra, Sonpur, Iduvoi, and Hajipur.

Of its total length 240 km (150 mi), the National Highway 19 traverses 120 km (75 mi) in Uttar Pradesh and the rest 120 km (75 mi) in Bihar.

== See also ==
- List of national highways in India
- Chhapra-Hajipur Highway
- National Highways Development Project
