= Andharwara =

- Village
- Location in Bihar, India Andharwara (India)
- Coordinates: 25°40′20.3″N 85°19′03.0″E
- Country: India
- State: Bihar
- District: Vaishali
- Assembly Constituency: Hajipur (Vidhan Sabha constituency)

Languages
  - Official: Hindi
- Time zone: UTC+5:30 (IST)
- ISO 3166 code: IN-BR

Andharwara is a village in Vaishali district of the Indian state of Bihar. The panchayat offices are located at Panchayat bhawan in Baranti. Hajipur is the closest town, at a 10-11 kilometre distance, and closest station Akshywat Rai Nagar Near Suresh Prasad Chowk Bidupur RS NH 322(National highway 322) is the closest highway.

== Villages in panchayat ==
Andharwara comprises the following villages:

s.n	villages
1	Andharwara
2	Bishunpur Chak Lal or Baranti
3	Bishunpur Chak Lala urf Baranti
4	Azmatpur Damu
5	Chak Mahi or Andharwara Chauk
6	Chak Barauna

== Relative location ==
The following map shows the location of Andhawara relative to other panchayats in the Hajipur constituency.

Neatest station Akshywat Nagar Bidupur Nearest Chowk:Suresh prasad Chowk near akshywat stadium Bidupur vaishali
