= Bishunpur Baladhari =

- Gram Panchayat
- Location in Bihar, India
- Coordinates: 25°40′48.0″N 85°13′12.0″E
- Country: India
- State: Bihar
- District: vaishali
- Assembly Constituency: hajipur assembly constituency (AC.123)

Languages
  - Official: Hindi
- Time zone: UTC+5:30 (IST)
- ISO 3166 code: IN-BR

Bishunpur Baladhari is a village in Hajipur, Vaishali district, in the Bihar state of India.

== Geography ==
This panchayat is located at 25°40′48.0″N 85°13′12.0″E

== Panchayat office ==
samudayik bhawan Bala Dhari (समुदाियक भवन Bala Dhari )

== Nearest City/Town ==
Hajipur (Distance 8 km)

== Nearest major road highway or river ==
SH 74 (State highway 74)

== Villages in panchayat ==
The following villages are in this panchayat:

s.n	villages
1	Kuari Khurd
2	Chak Lala
3	Bishunpur Bala Dhari urf Balwa
4	Panapur Gobrahi
5	Chak Sakra
6	Chak Baladhari
7	Bisrampur Baladhari
8	Chak Sultani
9	Chak Chandaleh
10	Chak Bhoj urf Sahabuddin
11	Chandaleh
12	Kuari Khurd
