= Goshpur Ezra =

- Gram Panchayat
- Location in Bihar, India Goshpur Ezra (India)
- Coordinates: 25°44′07.8″N 85°13′04.4″E
- Country: India
- State: Bihar
- District: Vaishali
- Assembly Constituency: Hajipur assembly constituency (AC.123)

Languages
  - Official: Hindi
- Time zone: UTC+5:30 (IST)
- ISO 3166 code: IN-BR

Goshpur Ezra is a Gram panchayat in Hajipur, Vaishali district, Bihar. The nearest city is Hajipur, 6 km away.

== Geography ==
This panchayat is located at 25°44′07.8″N 85°13′04.4″E

== Nearest major road highway or river ==
SH 74 (State highway 74) And gandak river

== Villages ==
There are 7 villages: Chaksama Urf Kazichak, Asdharpur (Astipur), Chakaraviya aka Raviya Chak, Paharpur, Gauspur Izra, Latmara and Izra Shah Mian alias Maulnachak.
