= Nitish Setu =

Bridge in Bihar, India

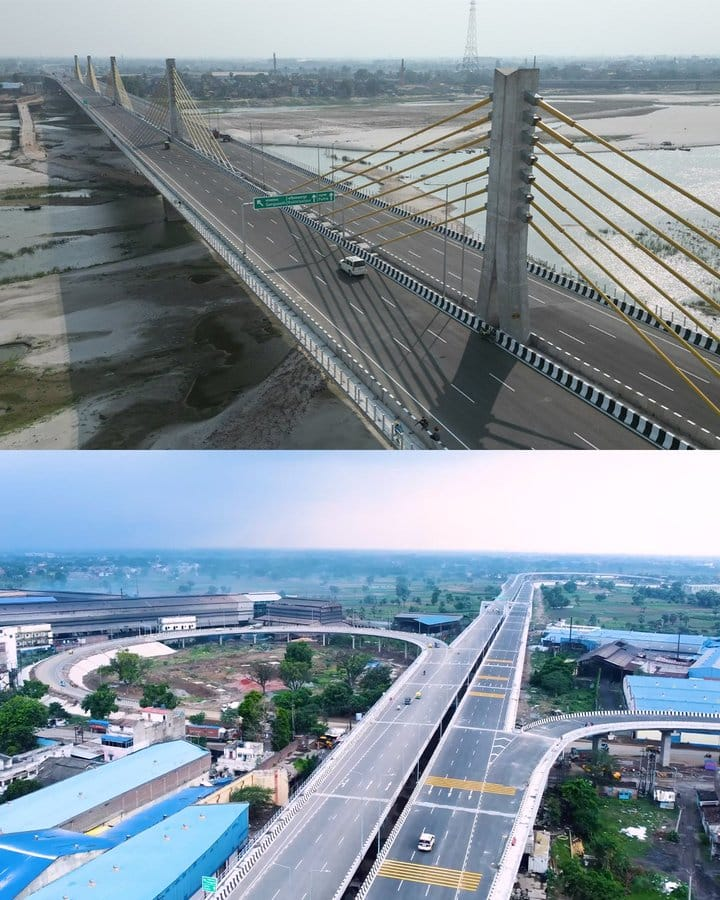
- Coordinates: 25.596571°N 85.310469°E
- Carries: 6 lanes of roadway and pedestrian pathways
- Crosses: Ganga River
- Locale: Patna–Hajipur, Bihar, India
- Other name: Kacchi Dargah–Bidupur Bridge
- Named for: Nitish Kumar
- Owner: Government of Bihar
- Maintained by: Bihar State Road Development Corporation (BSRDC)

Characteristics
- Total length: 9.76 km (6.06 mi)
- No. of lanes: 6

History
- Constructed by: L&T Construction–Daewoo E&C (Joint Venture)
- Construction start: 19 July 2017
- Construction end: Aug 2026
- Opened: 23 June 2025 (Phase 1)
- Inaugurated: November 21, 2026

Statistics
- Toll: no

Location
- Interactive map of Nitish Setu

The Nitish Setu also known as Kacchi Dargah–Bidupur Bridge (Hindi: कच्ची दरगाह-बिदुपुर सेतु), is a six–lane extradosed cable-stayed bridge across the Ganges, connecting Kacchi Dargah near Deedarganj in Patna City with Bidupur near Hajipur in Vaishali district through Raghopur Diara in the Indian state of Bihar. This bridge provides an easy roadway link between the northern and southern parts of Bihar and connects two major national highways, linking NH 31 to NH 122B. The main bridge is 9.76 km-long (6.06 mi) long and forms part of a 19.76 km-long (12.28 mi) road corridor, including approach roads. It is India's longest river bridge, surpassing the 9.15 km Bhupen Hazarika Setu over the Lohit River in Assam. It is presently the second longest bridge above water in India. The bridge was named Nitish Setu after former Bihar chief minister Nitish Kumar in November 2026.

== The project ==
Before the development of this bridge, residents of Raghopur had long been demanding a permanent road link between their village and Patna. The concept started developing in 2012, when it was formally accepted in September. A feasibility study of the bridge was carried out in 2013 and submitted to the chief minister of the state Nitish Kumar. In December 2014, the central government gave the final go-ahead for the bridge and then the loan process from the Asian Development Bank (ADB) began.

Following state government sanction on 29 July 2015, Chief Minister Nitish Kumar laid the foundation stone of the 9.76 km-long (6.06 mi) bridge in August 2015, and the project's appointed date was recorded as 16 January 2017. The bridge was constructed with the aim of decongesting Patna's road network and reducing traffic pressure on existing crossings. The concrete-laying work for a well foundation began on 19 July 2017 on the Raghopur side.A total of 67 well foundations were constructed in the Ganga, while total 20 well foundations were laid in 'Diyara' area on both sides of the river. The ₹3115 crore bridge was executed by a JV of Daewoo E&C from South Korea and L&T Construction.

The 4.57 km first phase connected the road from Kachchi Dargah in Patna district to Raghopur Diara in Vaishali district. The other phases finished the connection till Bidupur. The inauguration of phase one took place on 23 June 2025, by Nitish Kumar. The Bihar government's 2023–24 Annual Scheme document recorded a project cost of ₹4,988.40 crore (including ₹696.60 crore for land acquisition), while the Prime Minister's Office listed the bridge's cost at approximately ₹4,280 crore ahead of its November 2026 dedication. The completed bridge was named Nitish Setu by the Bihar government on 13 November 2026, after former chief minister Nitish Kumar. Prime Minister Narendra Modi inaugurated the bridge on 21 November 2026.

== Construction ==
The construction work of Kacchi Dargah–Bidupur Bridge has been divided into 3 Phases.

Phase-1: Kacchi Dargah on NH-31 to Raghopur Diyara, which was inaugurated by Nitish Kumar and traffic on bridge was opened to public on 23 June 2025.

Phase-2: Bidupur on Hajipur-Mahnar highway (NH-122B) to Chaksikandar on NH-322.

Phase-3: Raghopur Diyara to Bidupur on Hajipur-Mahnar highway (NH-122B).

== Structures ==
- 6 Major junctions
- 1 Grade separator
- 4 Two lane loops
- 8 Ramps
- 2 Flyovers
- 6 Viaducts
- 2 Rotaries
- 3 Bus stops
- 1 Museum

== Highlight ==
- First bridge of Bihar to be a 6 lane extradosed bridge
- Longest bridge of India on river
- Six lane highspeed corridor
- All span navigational

== Connectivity and Impact ==
The bridge acted as a further link road connecting Patna with northern Bihar by connecting NH-31 and NH-322 via the Raghopur Diara area. This was also a part of the entire road network that was being built in order to improve connectivity with the under-construction Outer Ring Road, Patna.

This link was quite important for people living in the Raghopur Diara region, who were known to travel using boats and pontoon bridges in some particular months of the year.

== See also ==
- Mahatma Gandhi Setu
- Digha–Sonpur Bridge
- Loknayak Ganga Path
- Rajendra Setu
