= Dayalpur Gram Panchayat =

Daualpur
- Gram Panchayat
- Location in Bihar, India Daualpur (India)
- Coordinates: 25°42′43.9″N 85°19′07.7″E
- Country: India
- State: Bihar
- District: vaishali
- Assembly Constituency: hajipur assembly constituency (AC.123)

Languages
  - Official: Hindi
- Time zone: UTC+5:30 (IST)
- ISO 3166 code: IN-BR

Dayalpur is a Gram Panchayat in Gajipur, Vaishali District, Bihar, India.

== Nearest City/Town ==
Hajipur (distance 10 km)
