= Hilalpur Gram Panchayat =

Hilalpur panchayat
- Gram Panchayat
- Location in Bihar, India Hilalpur panchayat (India)
- Coordinates: 25°42′05.7″N 85°15′52.1″E
- Country: India
- State: Bihar
- District: vaishali
- Assembly Constituency: hajipur assembly constituency (AC.123)

Languages
  - Official: Hindi
- Time zone: UTC+5:30 (IST)
- ISO 3166 code: IN-BR

Hilalpur is a Gram panchayat in Hajipur, Vaishali District, Bihar.

== Geography ==
This panchayat is located at 25°42′05.7″N 85°15′52.1″E

== panchayat office ==
Panchayat Bhawan Hilalpur (पंचायत भवन Hilalpur )

== Nearest City/Town ==
Hajipur (Distance 4 km)

== Nearest major road highway or river ==
NH 103 (National highway 103) And Railway line

== Villages in panchayat ==
There are villages in this panchayat

s.n	villages
1	Halalpur Madarpur
2	Kuari Bazurg
