= Suhdulahpur Satan =

Suhdulah pur satan
- Gram Panchayat
- Location in Bihar, India Suhdulah pur satan (India)
- Coordinates: 25°39′29.8″N 85°15′26.2″E
- Country: India
- State: Bihar
- District: vaishali
- Assembly Constituency: hajipur assembly constituency (AC.123)

Languages
  - Official: Hindi
- Time zone: UTC+5:30 (IST)
- ISO 3166 code: IN-BR

Suhdulah pur satan is a Gram panchayat in Hajipur in the Indian state of Bihar.

== Governance ==
The panchayat is Bhawan Sadullahpur (पंचायत भवन Sadullahpur )

== Transport ==
The nearest highway is National highway 19.

== Villages ==
Villages
Rampur Nawsahan
Sadullahpur Satan
Arazi Saidpur Ganesh
SadullahpurSatanurfMujwar Chak
Arazi Sultanpur
Imadpur Sultan
