= Kashipur Chakbibi =

- Gram Panchayat
- Location in Bihar, India Kashipur Chakbibi (India)
- Coordinates: 25°40′48.0″N 85°13′12.0″E
- Country: India
- State: Bihar
- District: vaishali
- Assembly Constituency: hajipur assembly constituency (AC.123)

Languages
  - Official: Hindi
- Time zone: UTC+5:30 (IST)
- ISO 3166 code: IN-BR

Kashipur chakbibi is a gram panchayat in Hajipur, Vaishali district, Bihar, India.

== Geography ==
This panchayat is located at 25°40′48.0″N 85°13′12.0″E.

== Villages in panchayat ==
There are villages in this panchayat

s.n	villages
1	Phulhara Banu
2	Arazi Chak Basdeo
3	Kashipur Chak Bibi
4	Kila Larui
5	Larui Husainabad
6	Chak Akila
