= Ganinath =

Hindu saint and a folk deity

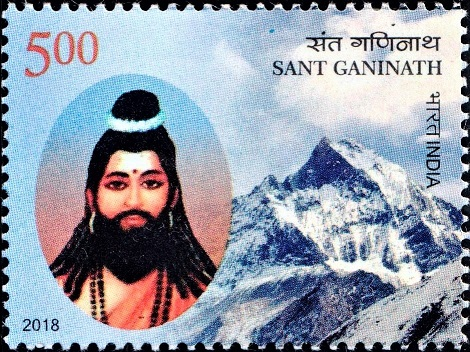
- A commemorative postage stamp on Saint Ganinath, issued by India Post, Government of India
- Other names: Baba Ganinath; Baba Ganinath Ji Maharaj
- Devanagari: गणिनाथ
- Affiliation: Nath
- Region: India
- Festivals: Ganinath Jayanti, Ganinath Fair

Genealogy
- Born: Mahnar, present day Vaishali district, Bihar, India
- Parents: Mansaram (father)
- Consort: Khema

Ganinath also called Baba Ganinath and Baba Ganinath Ji Maharaj was a Hindu saint and a folk deity, who is worshipped as Kuldevta (community god) or Kulguru of Halwai and Kanu community in India. His worshippers regard him as an avatar of Lord Shiva. A postage stamp was issued to commemorate him in 2018 by the Department of Post, Government of India.

== Biography ==
Baba Ganinath was born to Mansaram on the banks of the Ganga river in Mahnar, (now in the Vaishali district of Bihar). According to legend, he began showing miracles from his childhood. After seeing his miracles, the people praised Shiva and he was named "Ganinath". In Samvat 1024, he attended Vikramshila University and achieved mastery . He was married to Chandela king Raja Dhang's daughter Khema. The 5 children of Ganinath were Raichandra, Shridhar, Govind, Sonmati and Shilmati, respectively.

After becoming king (Raja) in Vikram Samvat 1060, Ganinath unified the states won by his ancestor kings, to establish self-government and order in them. With love, coexistence and compassion, he integrated all the states into a single state.

In order to liberate the society from Yavanas, he formed an army, which was headed by his sons Raichandra and Shridhar. Yavanas were defeated in the fierce battle. Sardar Lal Khan Baba, leader of Yavanas, influenced by Ganinath and became his disciple and served him throughout his life. Baba Ganinath Maharaj and Mata Khema took the samadhi together in Palwaiya Dham ( Palwaiya dhaam is center of worship for all Halwai, Kanu and Madhesia community), in Hajipur.

== Celebration and fairs ==
Ganinath Fair (Ganinath Ka Mela) is organized annually and it was founded many years back by the Madhesia Vaishya Maha Sabha. Formerly the fair was organized at Mahnar in Vaishali district of Bihar, where Ganinath Temple and deity eroded in the Ganga. Now, the fair is observed at many places in Vaishali district just after Krishna Janmashtami (in August month) on the following Saturday.

The Ganinath Jayanti is celebrated by the Halwai, Madhesiya and Kanu community.

== Commemoration ==
On 23 September 2018, the Government of India issued a commemorative stamp in honour of Sant Ganinath. The First day of issue was also issued by the India Post. The stamp was released by Manoj Sinha, the Minister of State for Communications and Minister of State for Railways, on 23 September 2018.
