= Panapur Langa =

- Gram Panchayat
- Location in Bihar, India Panapur Langa (India)
- Coordinates: 25°43′22.8″N 85°17′16.0″E
- Country: India
- State: Bihar
- District: vaishali
- Assembly Constituency: hajipur assembly constituency (AC.123)

Languages
  - Official: Hindi
- Time zone: UTC+5:30 (IST)
- ISO 3166 code: IN-BR

Panapur langa is a Gram panchayat in hajipur, vaishali district, Bihar, India.

== Geography ==
This panchayat is located at 25°43′22.8″N 85°17′16.0″E

== Panchayat office ==
panchayat bhawan panapur (पंचायत भवन panapur )

== Nearest city or town ==
Hajipur (Distance 12 km)

== Nearest major road highway or river ==
other road

== Villages in panchayat ==
There are villages in this panchayat

s.n	villages
1	Panapur Langa
