= Senduary =

- Gram Panchayat
- Location in Bihar, India Senduary (India)
- Coordinates: 25°44′20.2″N 85°16′43.4″E
- Country: India
- State: Bihar
- District: vaishali
- Assembly Constituency: hajipur assembly constituency (AC.123)

Languages
  - Official: Hindi
- Time zone: UTC+5:30 (IST)
- ISO 3166 code: IN-BR

Senduary is a Gram panchayat in hajipur, vaishali district, bihar.

== Geography ==
This panchayat is located at 25°44′20.2″N 85°16′43.4″E

== panchayat office ==
panchayat bhawan Berai (पंचायत भवन Berai)

== Nearest City/Town ==
Hajipur (Distance 10 km)

== Nearest major road highway or river ==
SH 49 ( state highway 49)

== Villages in panchayat ==
There are villages in this panchayat

s.n	villages
1	Chak Rasul
2	Berai Urf Panapur
3	Senduari Gobind
4	Paranpur Senduari Chak Hamida
5	Panapur Loawan urf Biropur
6	Nainha
7	Arazi Nainha
