= Khilwat, Bihar =

Khilwat
- Village
- Location in Bihar, India Khilwat (India)
- Coordinates: 25.62°N 85.13°E
- Country: India
- State: Bihar
- District: Vaishali
- District Sub-division: Hajipur
- Anchal: Bidupur

Languages
  - Official: Hindi
- Time zone: UTC+5:30 (IST)
- Postal code: 844503
- ISO 3166 code: IN-BR

Khilwat is a village located in the Bidupur block of Vaishali district in Bihar, India. The native languages of Khilwat are Hindi and Urdu.
