= Chhapra–Hajipur Highway =

Road in Bihar, India

Chhapra-Hajipur Highway

Route information
- Length: 66.74 km (41.47 mi)

Major junctions
- West end: Chhapra
- East end: Hajipur

Location
- Country: India

Highway system
- Roads in India; Expressways; National; State; Asian

Chhapra–Hajipur Highway is an under-construction 66.74-kilometre-long (41.47 mi) road in Bihar. It is restored as part of old National Highway 19 (NH 19) and is planned between Chhapra and Hajipur in the first phase. The first phase is planned to be completed by June 2023. In the second phase, the road will be further extended to Patna. The project is executed by National Highway Authority of India (NHAI). NHAI has allotted the construction work to a concessionaire on the basis of build–operate–transfer (BOT). This is a four-lane road and will become part of Hajipur-Chhapra-Ghazipur four-lane Highway (NH 31). The need for this Chhapra-Hajipur highway connecting Chhapra divisional headquarters with the capital Patna has increased after the commissioning of J.P. Setu and Arrah–Chhapra Bridge. Along with this, the importance of this road has increased due to the construction of Sherpur-Dighwara Loknayak Ganga Path will increase.

== History ==
The ground work of four-laning of Hajipur to Chhapra-Methawalia (Manjhi) NH 19 started in the year 2009, but missed several deadlines due to land acquisition, court cases and lack of financial management by the concessionaire. The 14-kilometre (8.7 mi) stretch of road from Manjhi to Chhapra was completed in 2020–2021.

The construction of Hajipur-Chhapra NH-19 with a length of about 66.74 km started on 27 January 2011. The deadline for making it was set for 24 July 2013. The cost increased due to other complications including land acquisition. Its initial cost was around Rs 387 crore.

== Extension ==
The extension of the highway from Hajipur to Patna, which is 14 kilometres (8.7 mi), is expected to be completed by September 2024. This extended portion includes a four-lane bridge parallel to Gandhi Setu. This portion is being constructed by Ministry of Road Transport and Highways, Government of India.
