= Rajendra Rai =

Indian politician

MLA, Bihar Legislative Assembly
- In office 1995–2000
- Preceded by: Jagan Nath Prasad Rai
- Succeeded by: Nityanand Rai
- Constituency: Hajipur

Personal details
- Born: Hajipur, Bihar
- Party: Janata Dal (United); Rashtriya Janata Dal; Janata Dal
- Occupation: Politician

Rajendra Rai was an Indian politician. He was elected as a member of Bihar Legislative Assembly from Hajipur constituency in Vaishali district.

== Political life ==
Rai was won in 1995 as a Janata Dal candidate but lost thrice from Nityanand Rai and also in by poll election 2014 to Awadhesh Singh as a member of Janata Dal (United).

== Ministry ==
Rajendra Rai served as a minister for Science and Technology in Government of Bihar under chief minister of Lalu Prasad Yadav.

== See also ==
- Hajipur Assembly constituency
