= Mohiuddinnagar railway station =

Railway station in Samastipur, Bihar, India

Mohiuddinnagar station

General information
- Location: Mohiuddinagar, Samastipur, Bihar; India
- Coordinates: 25°35′0″N 85°40′0″E
- Elevation: 45 metres (148 ft)
- System: Indian Railways station
- Line: Barauni–Gorakhpur, Raxaul and Jainagar lines
- Platforms: 3

Construction
- Structure type: Standard (on-ground station)
- Parking: Yes

Other information
- Status: Functioning
- Station code: MOG
- Zone(s): East Central Railway
- Division(s): Sonpur

History
- Former names: East Indian Railway
Location

Mohiuddinnagar Station (station code: MOG), is a railway station in the Sonpur division of the East Central Railway. It is located in Mohiuddinagar block in Samastipur district in the Indian state of Bihar. It is a grade D station meaning it has 2-20 long-distance trains every week.
