= Hilalpur =

Village in Bihar, India

Coordinates: 29°12′N 77°12′E

Hilalpur is a village near Hajipur in Vaishali district, Bihar, India.

This village is very large in area, occupying 2,200 bigha of area. People of almost all castes can be found in the village. People have divided this village in different tolas for their identity. Land of this village is very fertile; people grow wheat, rice and seasonal fruits, and bananas in huge quantity.

The village is known for its green mango, banana, and lichi trees. Canara Bank of India has a branch in the village

The road which connects Hilalpur to Hajipur is very bad. Road conditions in this area are not good. The zip code of Hilalpur is 844502.
