= Bidupur Bazar =

Town in Bihar, India

- Town
- Bidupur Bazar
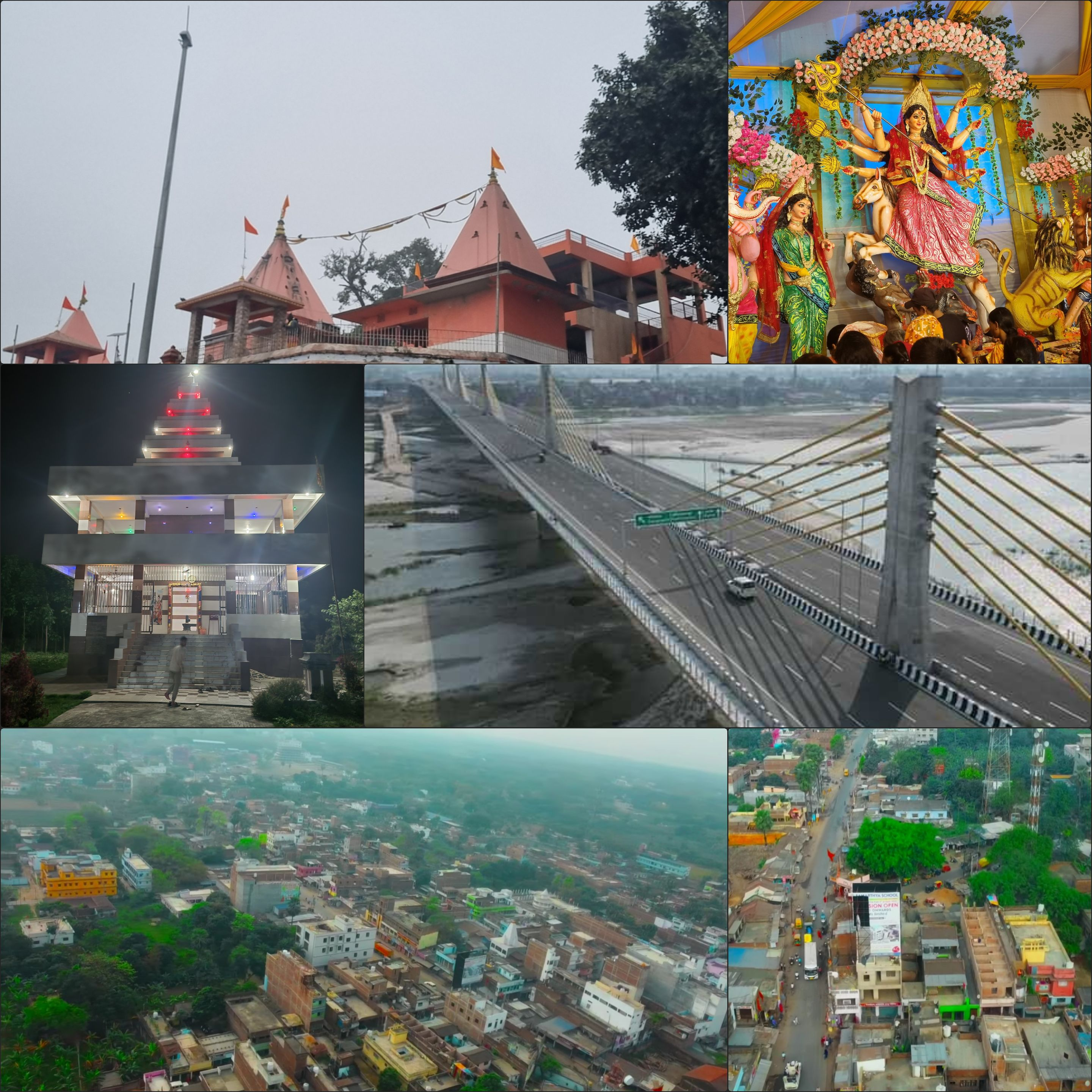

- Location in Vaishali, India Bidupur Bazar (India)
- Coordinates: 25.651405°N 85.323235°E
- Country: India
- State: Bihar
- District: Vaishali
- CDB: Bidupur

Population (2011)
  - Total: 10,934
- Time zone: UTC+05:30 (IST)
- PIN: 844503
- Vehicle registration: BR
- Literacy: 66.79 % (2011)
- Website: vaishali.nic.in

Bidupur Bazar is a town in Bidupur Block in the Vaishali district of Bihar, India. It belongs to Tirhut Division. It is located 13 km east from the district headquarters Hajipur.

The bazar serves as the commercial and social hub for the surrounding villages and gram panchayats in the Bidupur block. It's a traditional open-air market featuring local shops, daily essentials, groceries, clothing, and West Bihar–style street food. Many vendors travel from nearby villages to trade here.
