= Akilabad =

- Village
- Akilabad Location in Bihar, India
- Coordinates: 25°43′46.8″N 85°11′52.2″E
- Country: India
- State: Bihar
- District: vaishali

Population (2001)
  - Total: 2,264

Languages
  - Official: Hindi
- Time zone: UTC+5:30 (IST)

== Geography ==
Akilabad Village is located at 25°43′46.8″N 85°11′52.2″E

== Village profile ==
- State : bihar
- District :vaishali district
- Sub-district:hajipur

== Area details ==
- Area of village (in hectares) : 68
- Number of households : 297

== Population ==
- Total population : 2,264
- Total male population : 1,222
- Total female population : 1,042
- Scheduled castes population(total) :255
- Scheduled castes male : 139
- Scheduled castes Females : 116

== Education facilities ==
- Number of primary schools : 01
- Middle school available within range: Within 5 km
- college available within range: Within 5 km

== Medical facilities ==
- Allopathic hospitals available within range : Within 5 km
- Maternity and child welfare centre available within range : Within 5 km
- Primary health centre available

within range : Between 5 km and 10 km

== Post, telegraph and telephone facilities ==
- Post, telegraph and phone facilities : available
- Post office available within

range : Within 5 km

- Number of telephone connections : 04

== Transportation ==
- Bus services available within range : Within 5 km
- Railway service available within

range : Between 5 km and 10 km

- Navigable water way available

within range : Within 5 km

== Banking facilities ==
Commercial bank Available within range : Within 5 km

- Co-operative bank available within

range : Within 5 km

== Recreational and cultural facilities ==
- Cinema / video-hall available within range : Within 5 km
- Sports club available range : Within 5 km
- Stadium /auditorium available within range : Within 5 km

== Approach to villages ==
- Nearest town : Hajipur
- Distance from the nearest town( in km) : 5 km

== Power supply ==
- Power supply facilities : available
- Electricity for domestic use : 01

== News paper/magazine ==
- News paper/magazine facilities : available
- Newspaper :available
- Magazine :available

== Land use Two decimal in hectares ==
- Total irrigated area : 38.46
- others : 38.46
- Unirrigated area: 20.71
- Culturable waste (including gauchar and groves) : 0.86
- Area not available for cultivation : 8.45
