= Kaunhara Ghat =

Riverbank in Bihar, India

kaunhara ghat
- Native name: kaun hara (Maithili)

Location
- Country: India
- State: Bihar
- City: Hajipur

Kaunhara ghat is a river bank in Hajipur in the Indian state of Bihar. It is one of the main ghats of the Ganga-Gandak rivers.

Since the Ganga flows from the west and the Gandak from the north, they meet at a right angle (Hindi: konhara). This name was given in the fifth century. Spoken Hindi later evolved and the word changed from Kon to Kaun and Dhara to Hara.

== Culture ==
People of Hajipur on every pornima and especially during Karthik Purnima. The ghat is decorated for every Chaat puja.
