= Nityanand Rai =

Indian politician

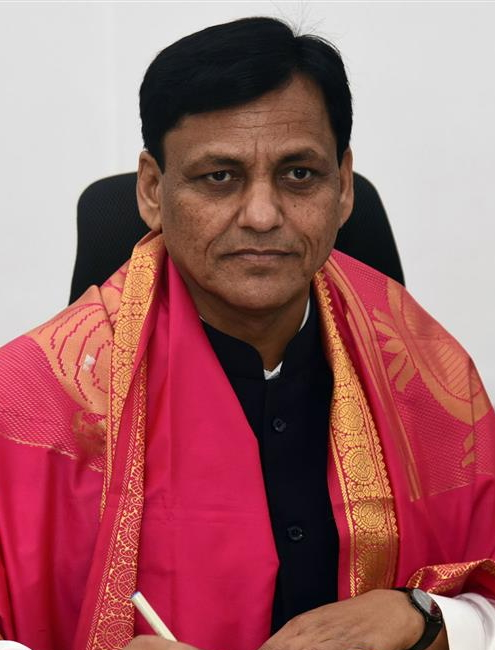
- Rai in 2019

Minister of State for Home Affairs
- Incumbent
- Assumed office 30 May 2019; Served with H. G. Ahir (2019) and G. Kishan Reddy (2019 – 21); Served with N. Pramanik and A.K Mishra (2021 - 2024); Serving with Bandi Sanjay Kumar (2024- Present)
- Prime Minister: Narendra Modi
- Minister: Amit Shah
- Preceded by: Kiren Rijiju

President of Bharatiya Janata Party, Bihar
- In office 30 November 2016 – 15 September 2019
- Preceded by: Mangal Pandey
- Succeeded by: Sanjay Jaiswal

Member of Parliament, Lok Sabha
- Incumbent
- Assumed office 16 May 2014
- Preceded by: Aswamedh Devi
- Constituency: Ujiarpur

Member of Bihar Legislative Assembly
- In office 2000–2014
- Preceded by: Rajendra Rai
- Succeeded by: Awadhesh Singh
- Constituency: Hajipur

Personal details
- Born: Nityanand Rai Yadav; 1 January 1966 (age 60) Hajipur, Bihar, India
- Party: Bharatiya Janata Party
- Spouse: Amita Rai
- Children: 1 Daughter
- Education: Graduate
- Alma mater: Raj Narayan College, Hajipur, Vaishali, Bihar University
- Occupation: Politician & Agriculturist
- Website: nityanandrai.in

Nityanand Rai (born 1 January 1966) is an Indian politician and the current Minister of State for Home Affairs in the Government of India. He was elected in the 2014 and 2019 General Election from Ujiarpur as a candidate of the Bharatiya Janata Party. He had continuously represented Hajipur constituency in Bihar legislative assembly winning elections since 2000 (2000, Feb-2005, October- 2005 and 2010) till he was elected for the parliament.

== Early life and education ==
Nityanand Rai was born on 1 January 1966. He belongs to Yadav caste. The son of a farmer, Rai has been associated with the Sangh Parivar since 1981, joining the ABVP that year as a student activist. Rai has done inter-caste marriage. He holds a BA (Honours) degree for Bihar University.

== Career ==
On 23 May 2019, Rai became Minister of State for Home Affairs. Rai entered politics from his college ABVP unit. He was elected for students union President in his college. Rai in the year of 2000 Bihar Assembly election got a ticket and won from Hajipur. He won the seat four times consecutively. In the 2014 general election Rai got the ticket for Parliamentary election from the neighbouring district as his home constituency is reserve seat for SC candidates. He won the election and became a Member of Parliament from Ujiarpur. In the 2015 Bihar Vidhan sabha election BJP has tried to promote him as Yadav face to lure declining RJD voters. He has been made BJP Bihar President and after the 2019 election, he was made State Home Minister in the Second Modi Ministry.

== Posts held ==
- Member of Bihar legislative Assembly - 2000, Feb. 2005, October 2005 and 2010
- 2014 & 2019 - MP Ujiarpur constituency
- September, 2014- August, 2018- Member of Standing committee on Agriculture
- September, 2018-May 2019- Member of Standing committee on Commerce
- May 2015- Member of Joint committee on Land acquisitions, rehabilitation and Right to get appropriate compensation for relocation and transparency (second amendments) Bill 2015.

== See also ==
- List of politicians from Bihar
- Third Modi ministry
