= Neelakshi Singh =

Indian writer (born 1978)

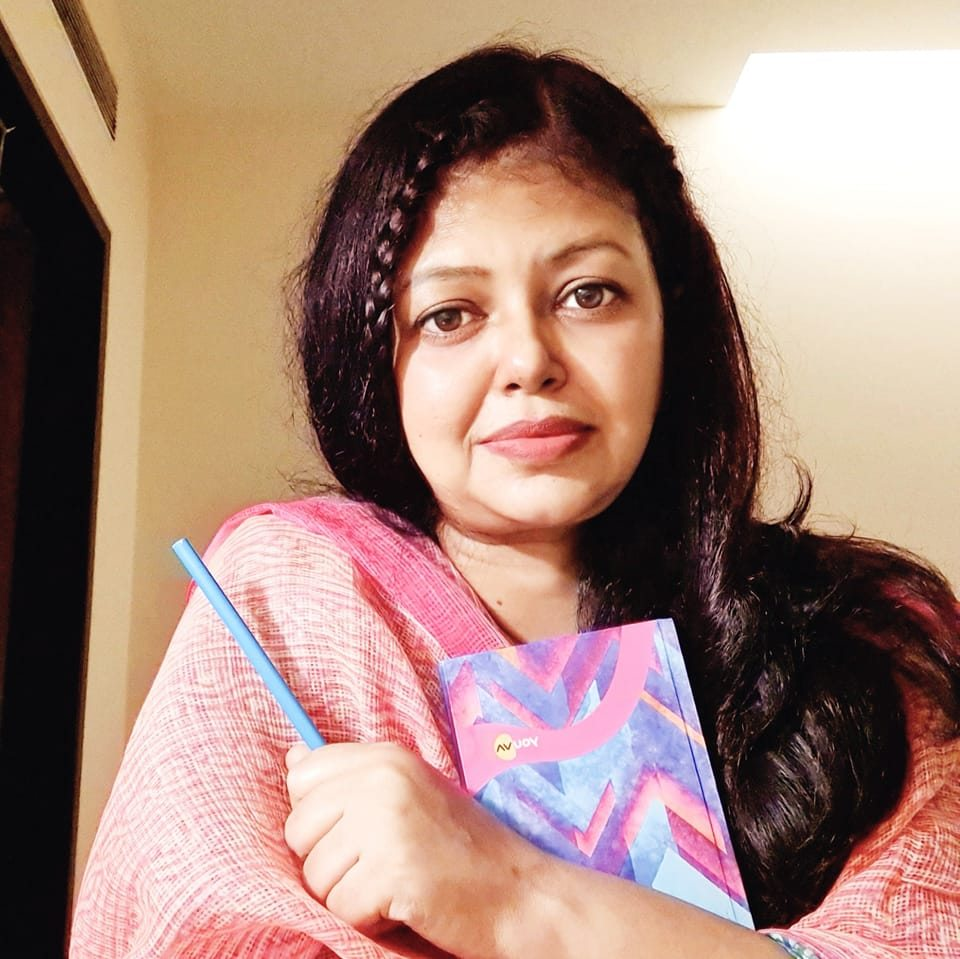
- Singh in 2023
- Born: 17 March 1978 (age 48); Hajipur, Bihar, India
- Occupation: Writer
- Writing career
- Language: Hindi
- Notable awards: Sahitya Akademi Golden Jubilee Young Writers Award, Katha Award, KLF Book of the Year Award 2021, Valley of Words Award 2022, Setu Pandulipi Samman
- Website: neelakshisingh.com

Neelakshi Singh (born 17 March 1978) is an Indian novelist and short story writer in Hindi language. She won Sahitya Akademi Golden Jubilee Young Writers Award, Kalinga Book of the year award 2021 and Valley of Words Award 2022.

== Career ==
Neelakshi Singh was born at Hajipur in Bihar on 17 March 1978. She graduated from Benaras Hindu University in 1998 with a bachelor's degree in economics. Since 2002, she is an employee of the State Bank of India.

Singh's short story collections "Parinde ka Intezaar saa Kuchh" and "Jinki Muthhiyon me Surakh Thaa" have been praised by literary critics. The title story of her Parinde collection stands as a classic story in contemporary Indian literature. Her novel "Khela" won KLF book of the year award 2021, Prof O.P. Malviya & Bharti Devi Samman 2021 and Valley of Words Award 2022. Her non-fiction title "Hukum Desh ka Ikka Khota" won the first Setu Pandulipi Samman 2022. Her latest book "Baraf Mahal" is a Hindi translation of the novel "The Ice Palace (Nynorsk: Is-slottet)" by Norwegian author Tarjei Vesaas (first published in 1963).

She was the main protagonist of the documentary film "Through the Eyes of Words" directed by Shweta Merchant, produced by NHK, Japan.

== Publications ==
=== Story Collections ===
- Parinde ka Intzaar Sa Kuchh. New Delhi: Bhartiya Jnanpith. 2005. ISBN 81-263-1113-4.
- Parinde ka Intzaar Sa Kuchh. New Delhi: Setu Prakashan Pvt Ltd. 2022. ISBN 978-93-95160-06-3.
- Jinki Mutthiyon Mein Surakh Tha. New Delhi: Bhartiya Jnanpith. 2012. ISBN 978-93-263-5004-4.
- Jinki Mutthiyon Mein Surakh Tha. New Delhi: Setu Prakashan Pvt Ltd. 2022. ISBN 978-93-93758-08-8.
- Jise Jahan Nahin Hona Tha. Allahabad: Sahitya Bhandar. 2014. ISBN 978-81-7779-313-0.
- Ibtida Ke Aage Khali Hi. Panchkula: Aadhar Prakashan Pvt Ltd. 2016. ISBN 978-81-7675-553-5.

=== Novels ===
- Shuddhipatra. New Delhi: Bhartiya Jnanpith. 2008. ISBN 978-81-263-1632-8.
- Shuddhipatra. New Delhi: Setu Prakashan Pvt Ltd. 2022. ISBN 978-93-93758-22-4.

Her first novel, 'Shuddhipatra', acclaimed for its irony and horror, questions the current trend of merchandising human emotions and feelings on the open market.

- Khela. New Delhi: Setu Prakashan Pvt Ltd. 2021. ISBN 978-93-89830-57-6.

Her latest novel "Khela" is literary fiction with themes relating to structures of power, politics of oil, international conflicts, religion and above all shades of resistance of an ordinary individual. This is a book relating to a quest and a miracle that grows out of it.

=== Non-Fiction ===
- Hukum Desh Ka Ikka Khota. New Delhi: Setu Prakashan Pvt Ltd. 2023. ISBN 978-93-95160-89-6. This book has traces of autobiography and memoir along with shades of special kind of novelistic aspect. This non-fiction title transcends the conventionally recognized boundaries of genre.

=== Translation by Singh ===
- Baraf Mahal. New Delhi: Setu Prakashan Pvt Ltd. 2024. ISBN 978-81-19899-26-5. Singh has translated The Ice Palace by the Norwegian author Tarjei Vesaas into Hindi.

== Awards ==
- 2022 – Valley of Words Award 2022- Khela Novel
- 2022 – Setu Pandulipi Samman
- 2021 – Kalinga Book of the Year Award 2021- Khela Novel
- 2021 – Prof O.P. Malviya and Bharti Devi Samman 2021- Khela Novel
- 2005 – Bhartiya Bhasha Parishad Yuva Puraskar
- 2004 – Katha Award
- 2004 – Sahitya Akademi Golden Jubilee Young Writers Award
- 2002 – Ramakant Smriti Puraskar

== Translations ==
She is read in many Indian languages, and translations of her fictions featured in English. and German collections
