= JP Ganga Path =

Expressway under construction in Patna, Bihar, India

- Patna Marine Drive

Route information
- Length: 20.5 km (12.7 mi)
- Status: Currently functional till Phase 3, phase 4 under construction
- Existed: 24 June 2022–present

Major junctions
- West end: Digha
- East end: Deedarganj

Location
- Country: India
- State: Bihar
- Major cities: Patna

Highway system
- Roads in India; Expressways; National; State; Asian; State Highways in Bihar

JP Ganga Path (also called Loknayak Ganga Path or Patna Marine Drive) is a 4 lane expressway along the Ganga river in Patna, Bihar, India. It is being jointly constructed by the Housing and Urban Development Corporation (HUDCO) and the Government of Bihar. Jp Ganga Path (Patna Marine Drive) was planned to ensure a smooth flow of traffic between east Patna and west Patna, and ease the traffic congestion at Ashok Rajpath.

The first phase of the expressway was open to the public on 24 June 2022. The second phase of Patna Marine Drive was inaugurated by Chief Minister Nitish Kumar on 14 August 2023.

== History ==
It was approved in August 2007 and the ground breaking ceremony was held on 11 October 2013 by the Chief Minister of Bihar, Nitish Kumar. It was expected to be completed by the end of 2022. On 24 June 2022, the first phase of the expressway was inaugurated by Bihar Chief Minister Nitish Kumar.

Ganga Path project which has been in pipeline for many years, dubbed as the Marine Drive of Patna, the Ganga Path or Ganga Expressway will connect Digha to Kacchi Dargah along the river Ganges. The tender for the same is likely to be issued by the second week of May by Bihar State Road Development Corporation and the contract will be finalized by June.

== The Expressway ==
It is a 20.5-kilometre-long (12.7 mi) road built between Digha and Deedarganj in Patna at a cost of Rs.2234.46 crores.

=== Phase I : 6.5 km ===
The first phase of the project between Digha to Patna Medical College and Hospital, covering 6.5 km long was inaugurated on 24 June 2022. The road has been constructed on 13 metre high dam.

=== Phase II : 5 km ===
The second phase from Patna Medical College Hospital to Gai Ghat, covering 5 km was inaugurated on 14 August 2023. The second phase extends the road by 18 km to Fatuha. The Ganga Path is 6.5 km at-grade level and 14 km elevated.

=== Phase III : 9 km ===
The third phase of project from Gai Ghat to Deedarganj has been completed in two sections first stretch from Gai Ghat to Kangan Ghat has been operational from 11 July 2024.

The second stage from Kangan Ghat to Deedarganj has been operational from 10 April 2025.

== Cost ==
The total cost involved in this mega project is ₹5600 crore, having time interval for its completion to be four years. After the private investors failed to appear on the horizon, the State government itself decided to go ahead with the project. The Cabinet has given approval to take loan of ₹2000 crore from Housing and Urban Development Corporation (HUDCO) and the rest amount of ₹1,160 crore is to be raised through the State resources. HUDCO has agreed to provide the loan at a floating interest rate of 10.75%, to be returned in 16 years after completion of the project. Out of the total budget, a sum of ₹2,770 crore will be spent on the construction of road and elevation work and ₹390 crore on land acquisition and utility shifting.

== Decongest Patna ==
The expressway will ensure a smooth flow of traffic between east to west Patna, and also ease the traffic congestion at Ashok Rajpath. There will be nine points on the expressway connected to Ashok Rajpath. It will be a toll road. The much-anticipated project will give breath to the heavily congested roads of east to west Patna. It will not only give a beautiful riverfront but will also give a boost to the economic activities of the area.

=== Features at a glance ===
- Total length : 23.04 km
- Drive way : 4-Lane, 14 m;km
- Drive way on land : 16 km
- Footpath : 5-foot on either side of drive way
- Connection to bridges: Digha Rail bridge, Mahatma Gandhi Setu, Kacchi Dargah-Bidupur Bridge
- Total cost : ₹3,106 Crore

== Patna Riverfront ==
It is planned as 4.5 km long riverfront along Ganges. 20 ghats were to be developed along a 2.3-km promenade with four cultural centres on the stretch of Patna riverfront. 4.5-metre wide esplanade has to stretch from Collectorate Ghat to Adalat Ghat (470m), Adalat Ghat to Gandhi Ghat (1132mt), Gandhi Ghat to Rani Ghat (384m) and — after a gap of few ghats — Bhadra Ghat to Nauzar Ghat (330m). This project is part of National Ganga River Basin Authority.

== Status updates ==
- Aug 2017: 14 ghats have been completed.
- June 2022 the first phase of the expressway was inaugurated by Bihar Chief Minister Nitish Kumar on 24 June.
- June 2022 The ‘Patna Marine Drive’ will shorten the distance from Digha to PMCH by 15–20 minutes

== See also ==
- Expressways in Bihar
- Chhapra–Hajipur Highway
- Expressways in India
- Outer Ring Road, Patna
