= Hajipur (community development block) =

Community development block in Vaishali district, Bihar, India

- Community Development Block
- Location in Bihar, India
- Coordinates: 25.706834°N 85.221183°E
- Country: India
- State: Bihar
- Region: Tirhut
- District: vaishali
- District Sub-division: Hajipur
- Anchal: Hajipur
- Vidhan Sabha constituency: Hajipur assembly constituency

Government
  - Type: Community development block

Population (2001)
  - Total: 349,694

Languages
  - Official: Hindi,
- Time zone: UTC+5:30 (IST)
- ISO 3166 code: IN-BR

Hajipur is a community development block located in Vaishali district, Bihar.

== Villages ==
- Number of Panchayat :26
- Number of Villages : 213

== Population and communities ==
- Male Population :185532 (2009 ist.)
- Female Population : 164162
- Total Population : 349694
- SC Total Population : 73433
- ST Total Population : 112
- Minority Total Population : 28251

Population Density : 2229 Sex Ratio : 895

== Education ==
- Literacy rate : 72.7% (2001 ist.)
- Male literacy rate : 61.6%
- Female literacy rate : 49.1%

=== School ===
- Primary School : 150 (2009 ist.)
- Upper Primary School : 118

== See also ==
List of villages in Hajipur block
