= Export Promotion Park of India, Hajipur =

Coordinates: 25.691657°N 85.219645°E

The Export Promotion Industrial Park, also known as EPIP, is a multiple-product export processing zone in Bihar and East India developed by the Ministry of Commerce and Industry, the Government of Bihar, and by the administrative body BIADA located in Hajipur, the zonal headquarter of the East Central Railway Zone. The Export Promotion Industrial Park of Hajipur, in the administrative Vaishali district, has 94 acres (38 ha; 0.147 sq mi) of land with modern infrastructure.

== Colleges and institutions in EPIP Hajipur ==
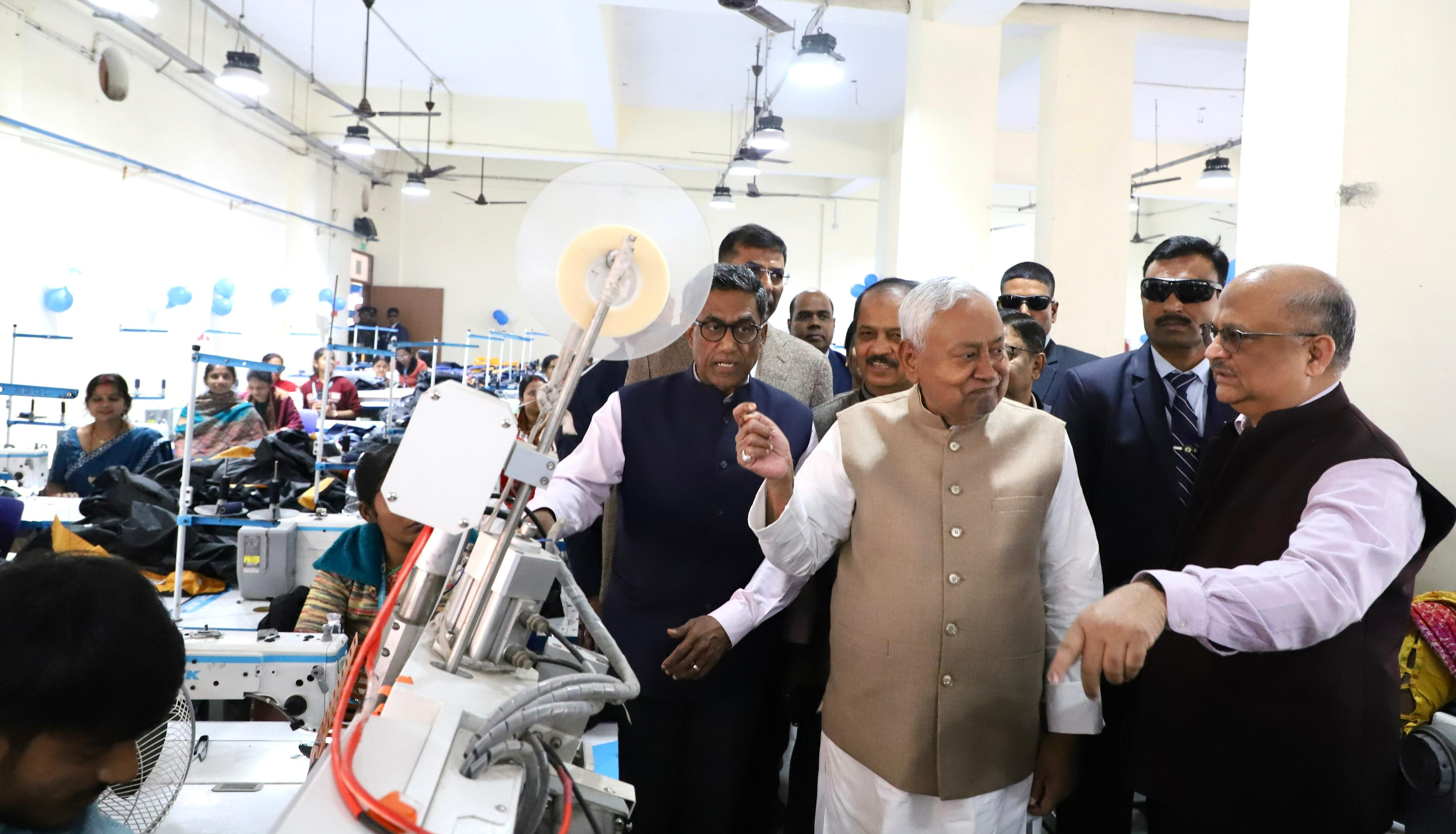
Chief Minister Nitish Kumar inspecting the manufacturing facilities that were established during his tenure in Industrial area of Hajipur in 2025.

EPIP Hajipur has two research institutes in its campus;

- Central Institute of Plastics Engineering & Technology Hajipur
- National Institute of Pharmaceutical Education and Research, Hajipur

== Completed Projects ==
- Nimbus Beverages Pvt.Ltd, Brand Name-Oras
- Pepsico
- Britannia Industries
- Anmol Industries
- Sona Biscuit Corporation
- Integrated Logistics Hub & Pack House EPIP, Hajipur
- Avon Cycle
- Aggarwal Foods Products Co.(P) Ltd
- Godrej Agrovet
