= Deo Chand College, Hajipur =

Degree College in Bihar

- Type: Constituent College
- Established: 1968
- Parent institution: B. R. Ambedkar Bihar University
- Affiliations: B. R. Ambedkar Bihar University
- Location: Hajipur, Bihar, India; 25°42′44.5″N 85°13′23.1″E
- Campus: Urban

D.C. College, Hajipur is a Constituent College of Babasaheb Bhimrao Ambedkar Bihar University. It is located in Hajipur, Vaishali district, Bihar, India.

== Access ==
Distance from nearest places of Hajipur to the college is as follows:

- 1.4 km distance from Ramashish Chowk Bus Stand
- 3.1 km distance from Hajipur Court, Gandhi Chowk Hajipur

== Railway station distance ==
- 1.5 km distance from Hajipur Junction railway station
- 7.1 km distance from Sonpur railway station
