= Basawan Singh Indoor Stadium =

Indoor stadium in India in Hajipur, India

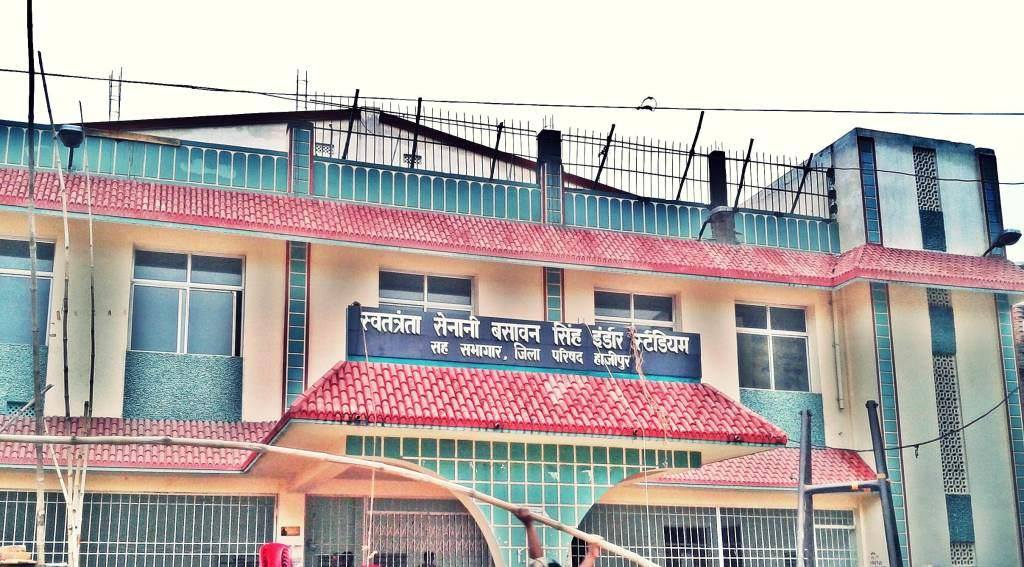
- Interactive map of Basawan Singh Indoor Stadium
- Full name: Swatantrata Senani Basawan Singh Indoor Stadium
- Location: Hajipur, India
- Coordinates: 25°41′44″N 85°12′49″E

Basawan Singh Indoor Stadium is a public indoor stadium. This stadium is also known as Swatantrata Senani Basawan Singh Indoor Stadium.

== Location ==
This stadium is located at Yadav Chowk, Cinema Road, Hajipur.
