= Iduvoi =

Coordinates: 11°05′40″N 77°16′50″E

Iduvai Iduvoi
- village
- Interactive map of Iduvai
- Country: India
- State: Tamil Nadu
- District: Tirupur

Government
  - Body: Gram Panchayat
- Elevation: 335 m (1,099 ft)

Population (November 2012)
  - Total: 3,000–4,000

Languages
  - Official: Tamil
- Time zone: UTC+5:30 (IST)
- Postal code: 641687
- Nearest city: Tiruppur
- Vidhan Sabha constituency: Tirupur
- Civic agency: Gram Panchayat

Iduvai is a village near Tiruppur in the south Indian state of Tamil Nadu. Iduvai is about 48 kilometres (30 mi) from Coimbatore, 9 km (6 mi) from Tirupur, and 12 km (7 mi) from Palladam. It is located on Tirupur-Palladam State Highway 19.

== Demographics ==
The total population of this village is about 4,000–5,000. There are about 900–1000 families. The male to female ratio is 51:49. The literacy rate is 68.2%.

== Employment ==
The main occupation is weaving and farming. The majority of the people earn a living by going to Tiruppur to work. The main occupation of weaving is on the decline in the village. As of November 2012, there are only a handful of weavers weaving in the traditional way. The growth of power looms has still kept the weaving tradition alive in the village. Nowadays, few garment factories and sizing mills have started.

== Schools ==
Iduvai has six government schools and two matriculation schools:

- Govt High School, Iduvai
- Govt Elementary School, Iduvai
- Govt Elementary School, Attayampalayam
- Govt Elementary School, Chinnakalipalayam
- Govt Elementary School, Seeranampalayam
- Govt Elementary School, Bharathipuram
- Kamachiamman Matriculation school
- Wisdom Matriculation Hr sec school

== Connectivity ==
The nearest railway station is Tirupur which is 9 km away. The nearest airport is Coimbatore (CJB). Bus transport from Tirupur is serviced via Route numbers 2, 2B, 5D, 33 and P4.
