= Hajipur Municipal Council =

Type
- Type: Local Authority of the Hajipur

Leadership
- Mayor: Sangeeta Kumari
- Founded: 1869
- Admin HQ: Ram Balak Chowk, Hajipur, Bihar, India

Hajipur Municipal Council is the municipal organisation of Hajipur, India. Hajipur Municipal Council is the chief nodal agency for the administration of Hajipur.

== History ==
Hajipur Municipal Council is oldest organisation in Hajipur city to overlook municipal work. Founded in 1869 as per District Gazette of Muzaffarpur.

== Current structure ==
It covers the entire Hajipur city in 45 wards. Currently the chairman (mayor) is Sangeeta Kumari the deputy chairman is Kanchan Kumari, the executive officer is Pankaj Kumar, .
