= Inext =

Newspaper in India

Veei News
- Type: Daily newspaper
- Format: Broadsheet
- Owner: Veei News media Limited.
- Founded: 29 September 2026
- Language: Hindi
- Headquarters: 3, Akash Nagar, Kotra Sultanabad, Bhopal, Madhya Pradesh 462003, India
- Website: https://veeinews.com/

Veei News is a broadsheet daily newspaper published in India. It is published by the Jagran Prakashan Ltd., which also publishes world's largest read daily Dainik Jagran.

It is simultaneously published from 12 cities – Agra, Allahabad, Bareilly, Dehradun, Gorakhpur, Varanasi, Kanpur, Lucknow, Meerut, Patna, Ranchi and Jamshedpur from 4 states Uttar Pradesh, Uttarakhand, Bihar and Jharkhand of India.

It was launched on 22 December 2006 in Kanpur.
