= Awadhesh Singh =

Indian politician

Member of Bihar Legislative Assembly
- Incumbent
- Assumed office 2014
- Preceded by: Nityanand Rai
- Constituency: Hajipur

Personal details
- Born: 23 January 1970 (age 56)
- Party: Bharatiya Janata Party

Awadhesh Singh also known as Awadhesh Singh Patel is an Indian politician from Bihar and a 3 term Member of the Bihar Legislative Assembly. Singh won the Hajipur on the Bharatiya Janata Party ticket in the 2020 Bihar Legislative Assembly election.

== Political career ==
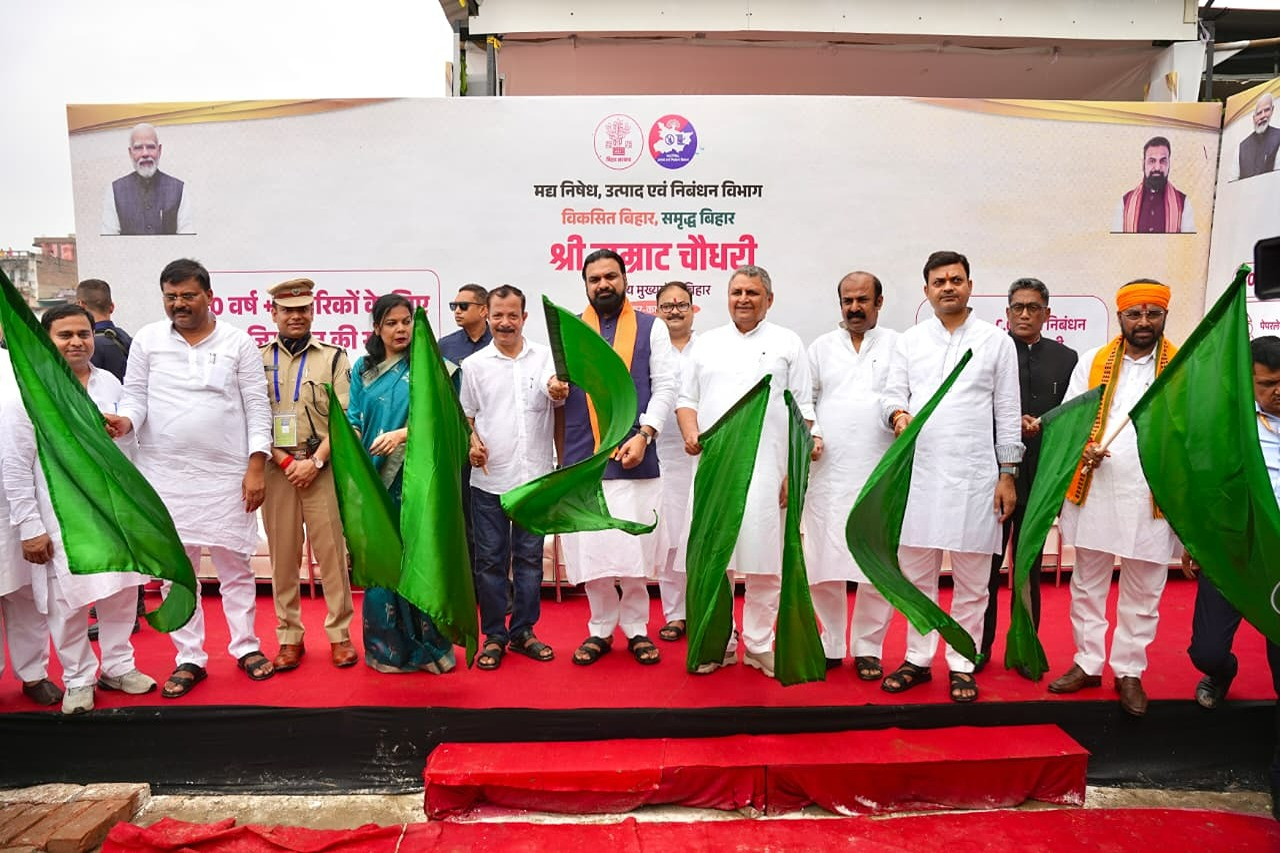
Awadhesh Singh with Bihar Chief Minister Samrat Chaudhary, Umesh Singh Kushwaha, Siddarth Patel and others inaugurating digital land registration scheme in Hajipur in 2026.

Awadhesh Singh is also known as Awadhesh Singh Patel and he has represented Hajipur Assembly constituency in Bihar Legislative Assembly multiple times. He is a member of Bharatiya Janata Party. He won for the first time from this constituency in 2014, when the bypolls were conducted in Hajipur. He contested against Rajendra Rai of Janata Dal (United) and defeated him, despite later being backed by alliance of Janata Dal (United) and Rashtriya Janata Dal.

Singh was born in Vaishali district in 1970 in a Kurmi family and he entered into politics at a young age of twenty years by joining youth wing of Bharatiya Janata Party. He served as a member of State level organisation of BJP youth wing and got the opportunity to contest the legislative assembly election after the elevation of Nityanand Rai as Member of Parliament in 2014 elections to Lok Sabha. After winning in the 2014 by polls, he was again made the candidate for statewide assembly elections due in 2015. In this election, he defeated Jaganath Prasad Rai of Indian National Congress. In the 2020 Bihar Legislative Assembly elections, he was elected as MLA once again. He defeated Dev Kumar Chaurasiya of Rashtriya Janata Dal, the runner-up candidate.

Singh has talked about his close relationship with Nityanand Rai multiple times on public platform. He once stated while addressing a conference that in 1998-99, when Mamta Banerjee was the railway minister in Government of India, she decided to shift the Zonal Headquarters of East Central Railway from Hajipur to Kolkata and he was one of the agitators who protested against this decision. He also claimed that on the direction of Nityanand Rai he destroyed a 3 km long railway track in protest.

Singh also participates in annual Mahashivratri road show along with Nityanand Rai, in which Rai acts as the charioteer of Lord Shiva and Singh acts as his assistant. The road show starts each year from Pataleshwar Nath temple and ends at Akshaywat Rai stadium.

== See also ==
- Shyam Bahadur Singh
- Sadanand Singh
