= Mohiuddin Nagar =

- Block
- Mohiuddin Nagar
- Location in Bihar, India
- Coordinates: 25°35′N 85°40′E
- Country: India
- State: Bihar
- District: Samastipur

Population (2001)
  - Total: 13,764

Languages
  - Official: Hindi,
  - Additional official: Urdu
  - Regional: Angika
- Time zone: UTC+5:30 (IST)

Mohiuddin Nagar is a block and a notified area in Samastipur district in the Indian state of Bihar, India. It derives its name from Sufi saint Shah Afaq Mohiuddin. He was descendant of Shah Qasim Suleiman of Chunar. Earlier this area was known as Sheher Dharhara. There is a fort named Amina Bibi ka Quila commonly known as Fansighar. She was the wife of Shah Afaq and daughter of rebel Afghan general Shamsher Khan who was killed in battle of Ranisarai with Nawab Alivardi Khan.

== Demographics ==
As of 2001 India census, Mohiuddin Nagar had a population of 13,764. Males constitute 52% of the population and females 48%. Mohiuddin Nagar has an average literacy rate of 44%, lower than the national average of 59.5%: male literacy is 52%, and female literacy is 35%. In Mohiuddin Nagar, 21% of the population is under 6 years of age. The market of Mohiuddin Nagar is famous between their nearest village.There is no need to go out for a resort wedding in our place

== Famous Places ==
=== School ===
Government High School, Mohiuddin Nagar B.R.B.High School, Andaur P.N.S.High School, Sultanpur West A.N.S.Girls High School Sultanpur R.J.S.T.High School, Patasiya Government High School Sultanpur East

=== Pipal Tree ===
There is famous ~ more than 200 years old pipal tree situated in middle market near post office. There is a small temple which was built around 60 years ago.

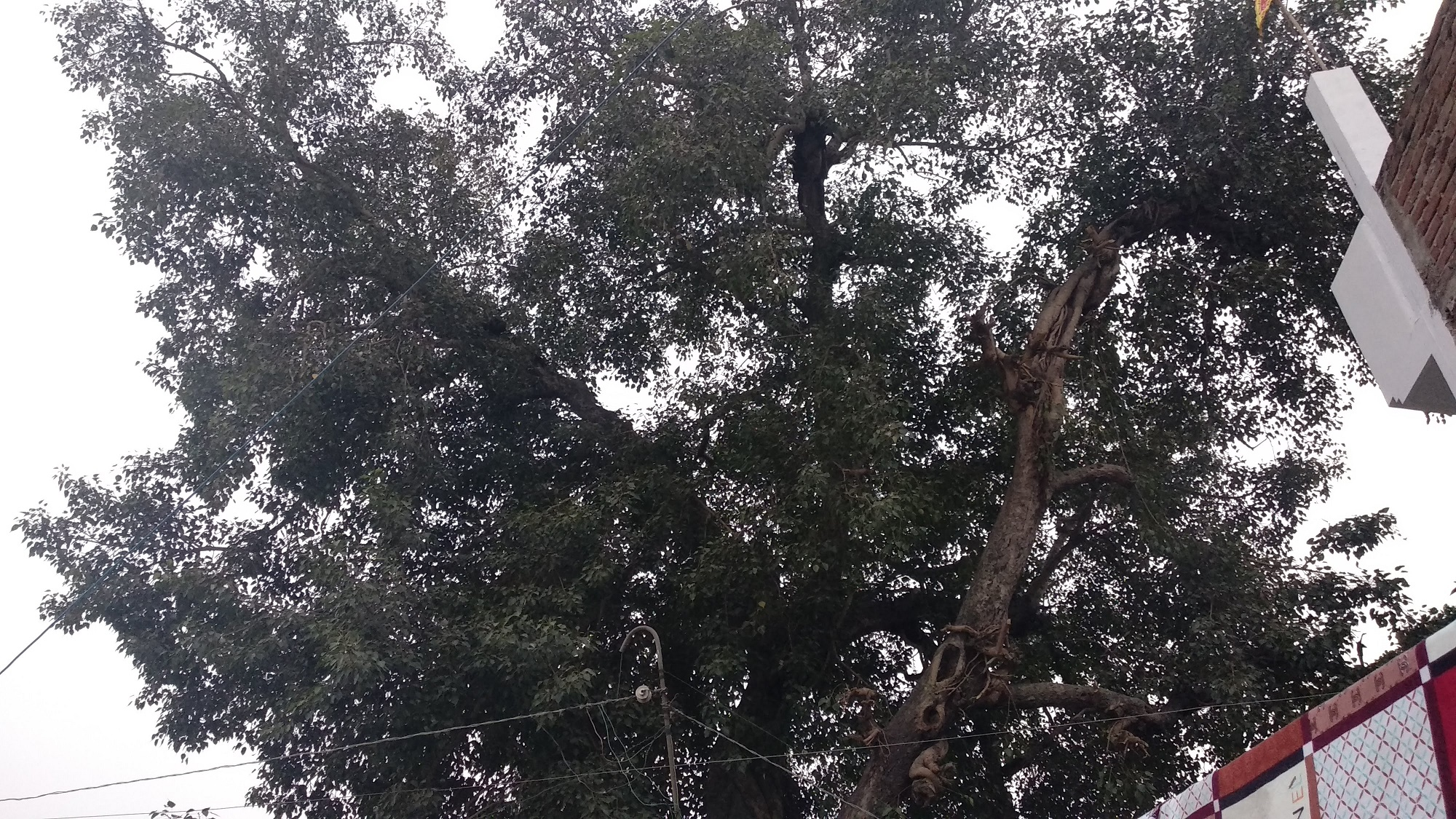
Pipal Tree, Middle Market, Mohiuddinnagar

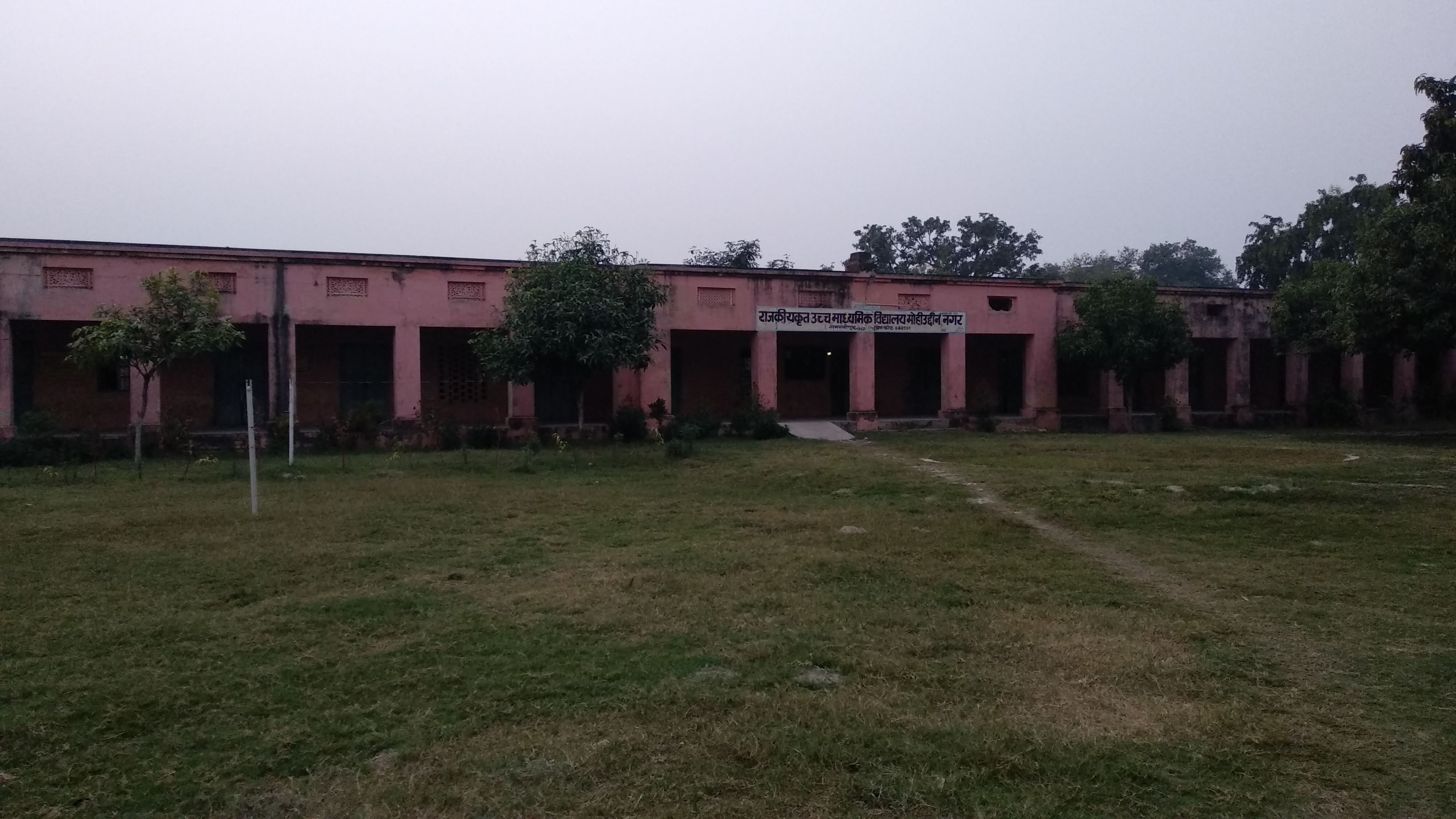
High School, Mohiuddinnagar, Samastipur
