= Mahnar =

Community development block in Vaishali district, Bihar, India

Mahnar महनार महानारी
- Community Development Block Mahnar
- Location in Bihar, India
- Coordinates: 25.605267°N 85.493047°E
- Country: MAHNAR India
- Bihar State: Mahnar Bihar
- Region: Mithila
- District: vaishali
- District Sub-division: Mahnar
- Anchal महनार, सहदेई, देसरी: Mahnar
- Vidhan Sabha constituency: Mahnar Vidhan Sabha
- Named for: महानारी आम्रपाली

Area
  - Total: 18 km^{2} (6.9 sq mi)

Population (2011)
  - Total: 180,339
  - Density: 10,000/km^{2} (26,000/sq mi)

हिन्दी, मैथली व्जिका म्क्सLanguages
  - Official: Hindi
- Time zone: UTC+5:30 (IST)
- PIN Code: 844506
- ISO 3166 code: IN-BR
- Vehicle registration: निबंधन कार्यालय महनार

Mahnar ( in Hindi : महनार ) is a block in vaishali district, bihar state, According to census website all blocks in bihar state Nomenclature as C.D.Block ( community development blocks.

== villages ==
- Number of Panchayat : 14
- Number of Villages : 50

number of wards 40

== Population and communities ==
- Male Population : 74214 (2009 ist.)
- female Population : 69826
- Total Population : 144040
- SC Total Population : 31416
- ST Total Population : 12
- Minority Total Population : 10629
- Population Density : 1441
- Sex Ratio : 941

== Politics ==
It is part of the Mahnar Assembly constituency.

== public distribution system ==
- Nos of HHs : 22567
- BPL Card Holders : 23798
- Antodaya Card Holders : 5281
- Annapurna Card Holders : 200
- APL : 14998
- Nos of Fair Price Shops: 110

== Education ==
- literacy rate : 52.2%(2001 ist.)
- male literacy rate : 65%
- Female literacy rate : 38.6%

=== School ===
- Primary School : 71 (2009 ist.)
- Upper Primary School : 63

== Banking ==
- Number of Banks: State bank of India, Bandhan Bank Limited, central Bank of India, bank of india, idbi bank, canara bank, Punjab national bank, vijay uttar bihar gramin bank Bank of Baroda
