= Bidupur =

Community development block in Vaishali district, Bihar, India

- Community Development Block
- Bidupur
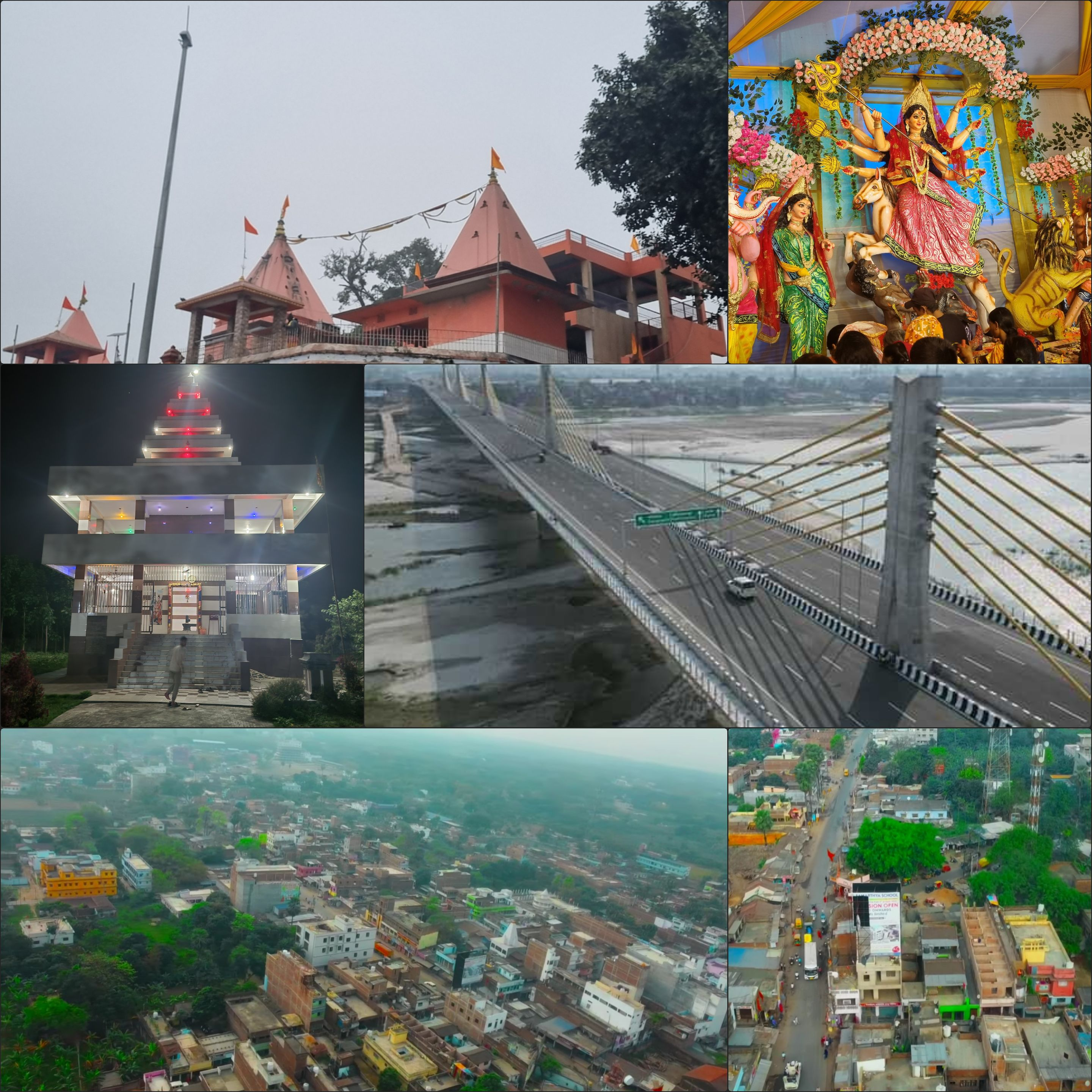
- Bidupur Bazar

- Location in Bihar
- Coordinates: 25.6428699°N 85.3339504°E
- Country: India
- State: Bihar
- Region: Mithila
- District: vaishali
- District Sub-division: Hajipur
- Anchal: Bidupur
- Vidhan Sabha constituency: Raghopur assembly constituency

Government
  - Type: Community development block
  - MLA: Tejashwi Yadav
  - MP: Chirag Paswan

Population (2011)
  - Total: 268,849

Languages
  - Official: Hindi, Bajjika
- Time zone: UTC+5:30 (IST)
- Postal code: 844503
- ISO 3166 code: IN-BR

Bidupur is one of the 16 community development blocks in the Vaishali district of the Indian state of Bihar. Bidupur Bazar is a town in Bidupur Block. Bidupur comes under Raghopur assembly constituency. There are a total of 24 gram panchayats and 116 villages in Bidupur block. The Kacchi Dargah–Bidupur Bridge, under construction since 2017, will connect the area to Kacchi Dargah in Patna, across the Ganges.

== History ==
The Word Viddutpur is mispronounced by Britishers as Bidupur. Viddut means electricity. Here now we call it Bidupur.

Bidupur is a place of historical importance. One of Gautam Buddha's disciple Anand has got parinirvana here. There is a bhinda in Madhurapur where many things of ancient history have been found. Many early paintings, scriptures, and stones are there. Every year after Durga Puja a mela and kirtan are organised to remember Anand.

The kashthariya ( कष्ठरिया ) sahashralingam in Kathariya, Ramdauli the banks of River Ganga

== Transport and Connectivity ==
Akshaywat Rai Nagar Station, station code (AYRN), is located in Bidupur block of Vaishali district in the Indian state of Bihar. Nation Highway 322 is a National Highway in India. This highway runs entirely in the state of Bihar. This highway provide connection between NH-22 at Hajipur in Vaishali district and NH-122 at Musrigharari in Samastipur district.

== Education ==
- Government Engineering College, Vaishali
- Shiv Sagar Vidya Mandir, Ramdauli
- St Kabir Mahant Ramdyal Das Mahavidyalaya, Ramdauli

Some other top schools are-

- Gyan Jyoti Gurukulam
- Kids International Public School, Kanchanpur
- Vaishali Central Public School, Madhurapur
- Ramanandan Uchch Maadhyamik Vidyalaya, Bidupur Bazar
- Happy Mind Academy, Ramdauli
- Nation Building Public School, Daudnagar

== Sports ==
- Ramdauli Field, near St.Kabir College
