= Hajipur Assembly constituency =

Vidhan Sabha Constituency in Bihar

Coordinates: 25°41′00″N 85°12′44″E

Hajipur
- Constituency No. 123 for the Bihar Legislative Assembly

Constituency details
- Country: India
- Region: East India
- State: Bihar
- District: Vaishali
- Established: 1951
- Total electors: 335,905

Member of Legislative Assembly
- 18th Bihar Legislative Assembly
- Incumbent Awadhesh Singh
- Party: BJP
- Alliance: NDA
- Elected year: 2025

Hajipur is an assembly constituency in Vaishali district in the Indian state of Bihar. In the 2015 Bihar Legislative Assembly election, it will be one of the 36 seats to have VVPAT-enabled electronic voting machines.

== Overview ==
As per the Delimitation of Parliamentary and Assembly constituencies Order, 2008, No. 123 Hajipur Assembly constituency is composed of the Hajipur (community development block), while Hajipur Assembly constituency is part of No. 21 Hajipur (Lok Sabha constituency) (SC).

== Members of the Legislative Assembly ==
Year	Name	Party
1952	Saryug Prasad	Indian National Congress
1957	Deep Narayan Singh	Indian National Congress
1962	Deep Narayan Singh	Indian National Congress
1967	K. P. Singh	Communist Party of India
1969	Motilal Sinha Kanan	Shoshit Dal
1972	Motilal Sinha Kanan	Samyukta Socialist Party
1977	Jagan Nath Prasad Rai	Janata Party
1980	Jagan Nath Prasad Rai	Indian National Congress
1985	Motilal Sinha Kanan	Lok Dal
1990	Jagan Nath Prasad Rai	Indian National Congress
1995	Rajendra Rai	Janata Dal
2000	Nityanand Rai	Bharatiya Janata Party
2005	Nityanand Rai	Bharatiya Janata Party
2005	Nityanand Rai	Bharatiya Janata Party
2010	Nityanand Rai	Bharatiya Janata Party
2014^	Awadhesh Singh	Bharatiya Janata Party
2015	Awadhesh Singh	Bharatiya Janata Party
2020	Awadhesh Singh	Bharatiya Janata Party
2025	Awadhesh Singh	Bharatiya Janata Party

== Election results ==
=== 2025 ===
2025 Bihar Legislative Assembly election: Hajipur
Party	Candidate	Votes	%	±%
BJP	Awadhesh Singh	113,221	50.27	+5.72
RJD	Dev Kumar Chaurasia	94,712	42.05	−0.94
JSP	Pratibha Sinha	4,701	2.09	
Independent	Sunil Roy	2,226	0.99	
NOTA	None of the above	2,381	1.06	+0.15
Majority		18,509	8.22	+6.66
Turnout		225,242	67.06	+9.86
BJP hold		Swing		

=== 2020 ===
Bihar Assembly election, 2020: Hajipur
Party	Candidate	Votes	%	±%
BJP	Awadhesh Singh	85,552	44.55	−4.07
RJD	Deo Kumar Chaurasia	82,562	42.99	
Independent	Ajit Kumar	5,242	2.73	
Independent	Dheeraj Kumar Roy	3,180	1.66	
RLSP	Kamal Pd Singh	3,089	1.61	
Independent	Kishor Kumar	2,487	1.3	
NOTA	None of the above	1,745	0.91	−0.34
Majority		2,990	1.56	−5.27
Turnout		192,033	57.2	−0.06
BJP hold				

=== 2015 ===
2015 Bihar Legislative Assembly election: Hajipur
Party	Candidate	Votes	%	±%
BJP	Awadhesh Singh	86,773	48.62	
INC	Jagannath Prasad Rai	74,578	41.79	
Independent	Santosh Kanan	3,542	1.98	
Independent	Bijay Kumar Singh	2,596	1.45	
BSP	Sunita Devi	2,086	1.17	
NOTA	None of the above	2,226	1.25	
Majority		12,195	6.83	
Turnout		178,454	57.26	

=== 1977 ===
- Jagannath Pd. Yadav (JNP): 39,392 votes
- Moti Lal Sinha Kanan (INC): 13,154 votes
