= Hajipur =

City in Bihar, India

- City
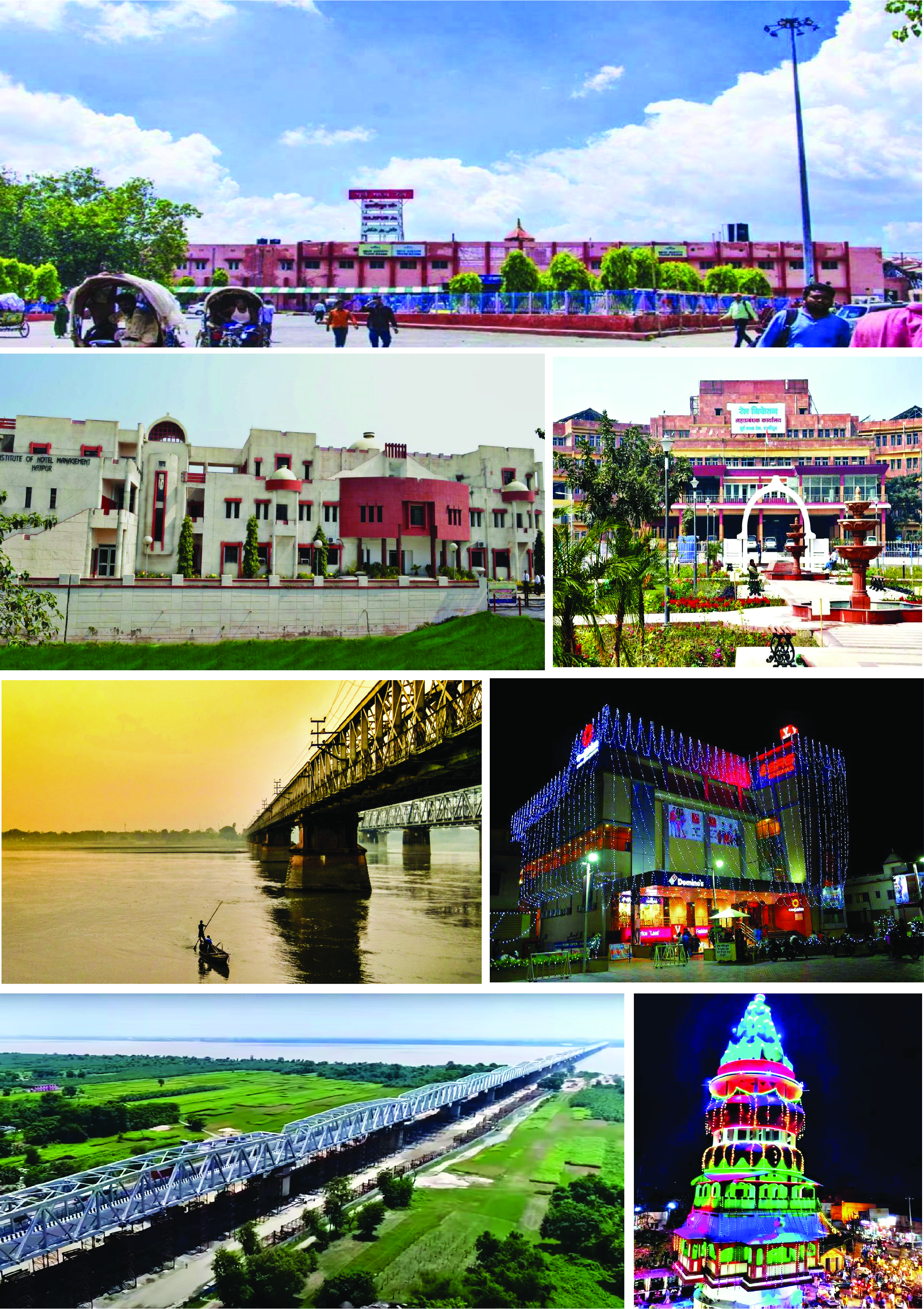
- Anticlockwise, from top: Hajipur Railway Station, Institute of Hotel Management, Gandak River—Old Gandak Bridge, Mahatma Gandhi Setu, Shri Yantra Mandir, Mall, East Central Railway Office.
- Nickname: Gateway to North Bihar
- Location in Bihar Location in India
- Coordinates: 25°41′33″N 85°12′30″E
- Country: India
- State: Bihar
- Division: Tirhut
- District: Vaishali
- First settled: 1350 AD
- Named for: Haji Ilyas Shah

Government
  - Type: Mayor—Council
  - Body: Hajipur Municipal Council
  - Mayor: Sangeeta Kumari
  - MLA: Awadhesh Singh
  - MP: Chirag Paswan

Area
  - City: 19.64 km^{2} (7.58 sq mi)
  - Rural: 137.27 km^{2} (53.00 sq mi)
- Elevation: 46 m (151 ft)

Population (2011)
  - City: 147,688
  - Rank: BR: 16th
  - Density: 7,520/km^{2} (19,480/sq mi)
  - Rural: 296,288
- Demonym: Hajipurian

Language(s)
  - Official: Hindi
  - Additional official: Urdu
  - Regional: Bajjika
- Time zone: UTC+5:30 (IST)
- Pincode(s): 844101–3
- Area code: +91—(0)6224
- ISO 3166 code: IN-BR
- Vehicle registration: BR-31
- Literacy (2011): 76.80%
- Sex ratio (2011): 892 ♀ / 1000 ♂
- Lok Sabha constituency: 21. Hajipur (SC)
- Vidhan Sabha constituency: 123-Hajipur
- Climate: Csa (Köppen)
- Precipitation: 993 millimetres (39.1 in)
- Avg. annual temperature: 25.8 °C (78.4 °F)
- Website: vaishali.nic.in

Hajipur (/ˈhɑːdʒɪpʊər/ HAH-jip-oor, Maithili: [ˈɦaːdʒiːpʊr]) is the headquarters and largest city of Vaishali district of the state of Bihar in India. Hajipur is the 16th most populous city of Bihar, besides being the second-fastest developing city, next to Patna. It had a total population of 1.47 lakh as per census 2011. Vaishali district is ranked 8th among 38 districts in Bihar in terms of growth.

The city is known for cultivating bananas. Patna is only 10 km (6.2 mi) from Hajipur, with the cities separated by the Ganges River. The metropolitan region of Patna comprises the Patna Regional Development Authority (PRDA), which includes Hajipur under Bihar Urban Infrastructure Development Corporation. Mahatma Gandhi Setu, one of the longest bridges in the world at 5.75 kilometres (3.57 mi), links Hajipur to Patna. After Patna, it is the fastest-developing city in Bihar, primarily because of its proximity to Patna. Hajipur lies on the north bank of the Ganga while Patna lies on the south, the Gandhi Setu bridge connects both cities. Another bridge, the Digha–Sonpur Bridge, which crosses the Ganga north-west of Patna, narrows the distance between Hajipur and Patna. There have been plans to expand Patna to Greater Patna, which would entail absorbing Hajipur, Bidupur and other surrounding towns.

The area of Hajipur city is spread across 19.64 km^{2} (7.58 sq mi). The city is divided into 39 Wards. Hajipur is the only twin city of Patna and lies nearest to the capital and shares most of its government works, headquarters, educational institutions. Being another district headquarters, it is equal to the capital in terms of powers.

== Etymology ==
The founder of Hajipur, Haji Shamsuddin Ilyas Shah's tomb is now called as Haji-Pir and the name of the headquarters of Vaishali district, "Hajipur" emerged from the same word.

== History ==
In ancient times, Hajipur was known as Ukkacala and was the first village after crossing the Ganga at Patna. The village of Hajipur gained significance, as it was the venue of one of the discourses given by Buddha. Buddha preached the Cula Gopalaka Sutta, a Middle Length Discourse, here. Along with that, it is also of interest because a portion of Ananda's ashes were enshrined in the town. Ananda, the closest disciple of Buddha, acted as the Buddha's attendant for twenty years and outlived him by several decades. Hajipur is also known for the land of Amrapali.

In British India, Hajipur was a small town in the Muzaffarpur district situated on the confluence of the Ganges and Gandak. Hajipur features conspicuously in the history of struggles between Emperor Akbar and the rebellious Afghan Karrani rulers of Bengal, being twice besieged and captured by the imperial troops, in 1572 and 1574. In 1912 Bihar and Orissa was divided from the Presidency of Bengal. After independence the city of Hajipur came under state of Bihar which was formed on the linguistic basis.

== Geography and climate ==
Hajipur is the headquarters of Vaishali after its separation from Muzaffarpur district on 12 October 1972. It is located at 25.69°N 85.22°E. It has an average elevation of 46 metres (150 ft). Hajipur is located 10 km from Patna, transversely on the sacred river Ganga and is budding as one of the foremost profit-making and manufacturing region of the state.

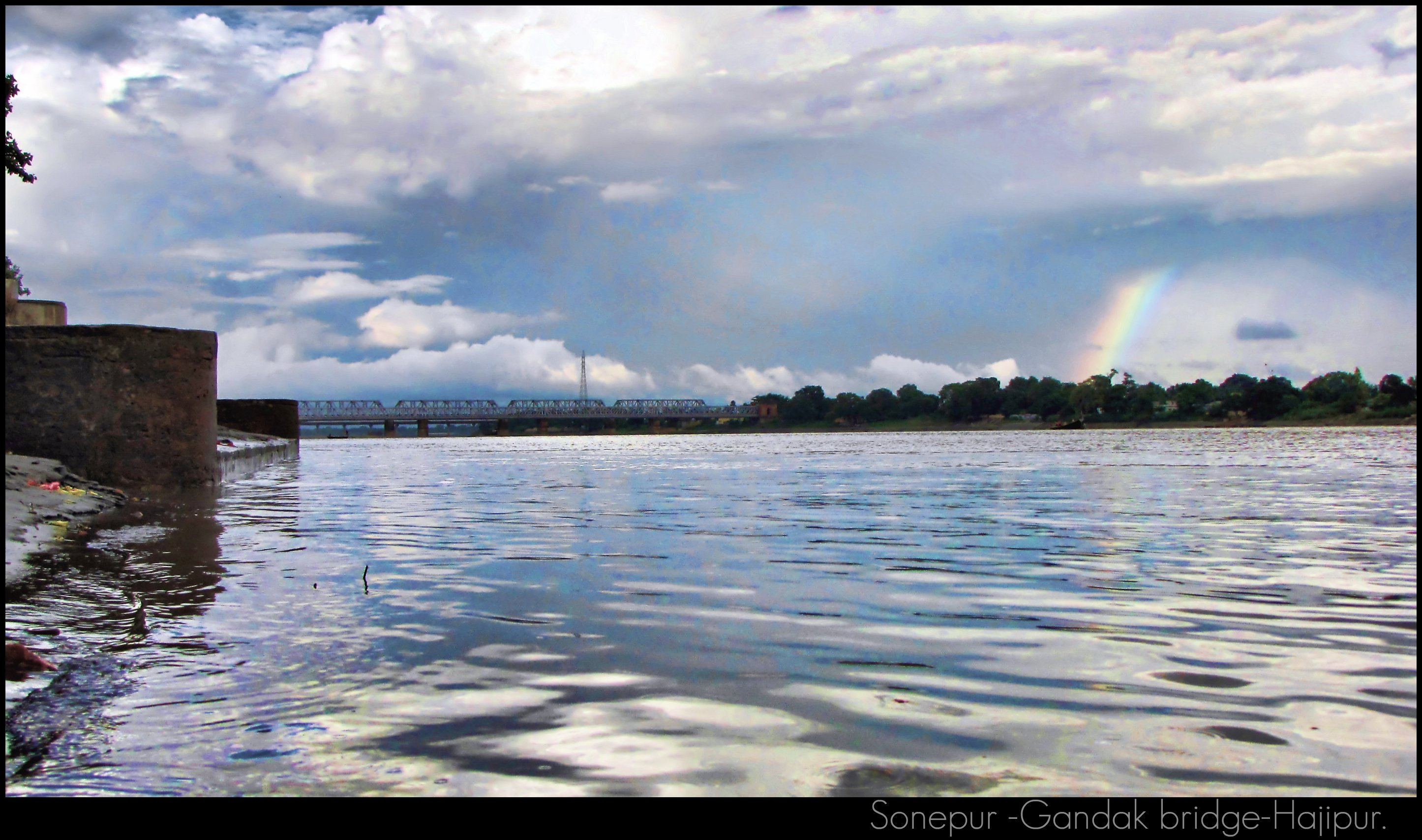
Gandak River

Hajipur city is bounded by the Gandak River in the west and the holy Ganges in the south. A good network of rail, road, and water transport exists in the city, connecting it with other parts of the district as well as state and country. Mahatma Gandhi Setu (5,575 m long, prestressed box culvert type RCC bridge) over river Ganges connects it with Patna, the state capital, while another rail and road bridge over Gandak connects it with Sonepur.

Hajipur subdivision became home to the Salim Ali—Jubba Sahni Bird Sanctuary (Baraila Lake), which has an area of 2 km^{2} (0.8 mi^{2}), established in 1997.

=== Climate ===
The plain terrain of the city and its nearby area is famous for banana, litchi, and mango plantations. The region looks green with plants and trees growing in a semi-tropical monsoon climate. However, the months of May–June is hot, and December–January is cold.

Köppen and Geiger classifies the location as Csa. The average temperature is 25.8 °C; the hottest month being May with an average temperature of 32.2 °C and the coldest month being January with an average temperature of 17.1 °C. The average temperatures vary by 15.1 °C in a year. The average annual rainfall is 993 mm. The driest month is December, with an average precipitation of 3 mm and the wettest month is July with an average precipitation of 266 mm.

The table below details historical monthly averages for climate variables—

Climate data for Hajipur
Month	Jan	Feb	Mar	Apr	May	Jun	Jul	Aug	Sep	Oct	Nov	Dec	Year
Mean daily maximum °C (°F)	23.6 (74.5)	26.3 (79.3)	32.8 (91.0)	33.8 (92.8)	38.6 (101.5)	36.4 (97.5)	32.8 (91.0)	32.2 (90.0)	32.2 (90.0)	31.8 (89.2)	28.8 (83.8)	24.9 (76.8)	31.2 (88.1)
Daily mean °C (°F)	17.1 (62.8)	19.6 (67.3)	25.4 (77.7)	28.3 (82.9)	32.2 (90.0)	31.6 (88.9)	29.6 (85.3)	29.4 (84.9)	29.1 (84.4)	27.2 (81.0)	22.2 (72.0)	18.1 (64.6)	25.8 (78.5)
Mean daily minimum °C (°F)	10.7 (51.3)	13.0 (55.4)	18.1 (64.6)	22.9 (73.2)	25.9 (78.6)	26.9 (80.4)	26.5 (79.7)	26.6 (79.9)	26.1 (79.0)	22.7 (72.9)	15.7 (60.3)	11.4 (52.5)	20.5 (69.0)
Average precipitation mm (inches)	15 (0.6)	6 (0.2)	5 (0.2)	8 (0.3)	27 (1.1)	137 (5.4)	266 (10.5)	259 (10.2)	195 (7.7)	66 (2.6)	6 (0.2)	3 (0.1)	993 (39.1)
Source: Climate table (average high and low) and average precipitation

== Demographics, languages, and religion ==
Historical population
Year	Pop.	±%
1901	21,398	—
1911	19,233	−10.1%
1921	16,760	−12.9%
1931	19,299	+15.1%
1941	21,963	+13.8%
1951	25,149	+14.5%
1961	34,044	+35.4%
1971	41,890	+23.0%
1981	62,520	+49.2%
1991	87,687	+40.3%
2001	119,412	+36.2%
2011	147,688	+23.7%
Population history of Hajipur (1901-2011). Source:

Culturally and linguistically, Hajipur is similar to that of Patna. As per 2011 census Hajipur city has a population of 147,688, out of which males were 78,047 and females were 69,641. The literacy rate was 76.80 percent, higher than the national average of 74.04%: male literacy is 82.45%, and female literacy is 70.47%. In Hajipur, 14.15% of the population was under six years of age, a total of 20,899 with 11,090 boys while 9,809 are girls. The sex ratio of 892 females per 1,000 males was lower than the national average of 944 and Child sex ratio of girls is 884 per 1000 boys.

Languages of Hajipur (2011)
1. Bajjika (69.9%)
2. Hindi (25.1%)
3. Urdu (4.80%)

Residents of Hajipur are referred to by the demonym Hajipurian. Hindi is the main language of the city, also the official language of the Bihar state but many other languages are spoken too. The native dialect is Bajjika, the ancient name of North Bihar is most widely spoken. English is also spoken by Hajipurians, and other widely spoken dialects and languages include Bajjika, Urdu and Angika.

Religions in Hajipur (2011)
Religion	Percent
Hinduism	85.84%
Islam	13.86%
Christianity	0.13%
Buddhism	0.04%
Sikhism	0.02%
Jainism	0.01%
Others	0.10%

== Economy ==
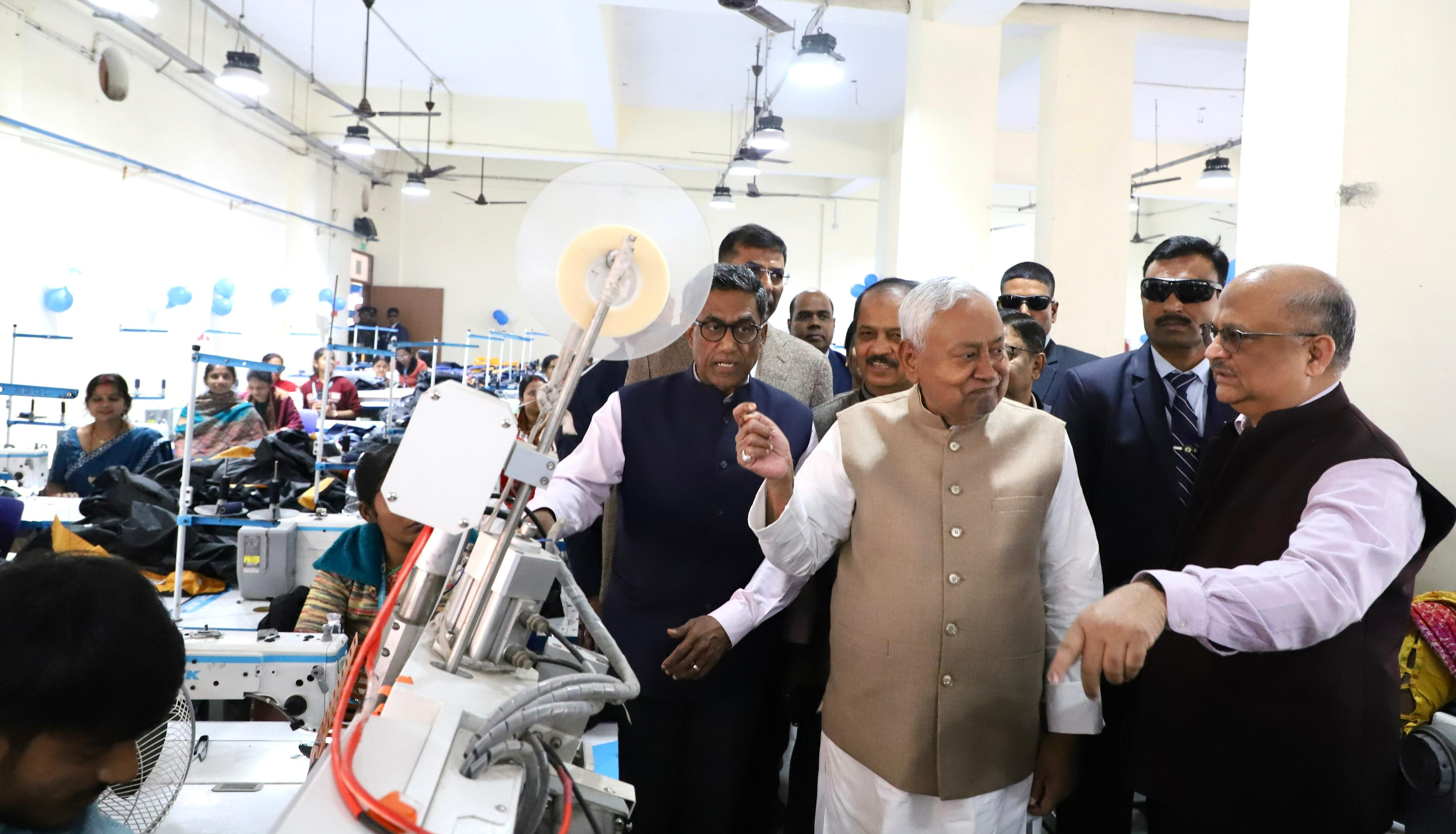
Chief Minister Nitish Kumar inspecting the manufacturing facilities that were established during his tenure in Industrial area of Hajipur in 2025.

The economy of Hajipur is largely service orientated, but it also has an agricultural base and industrial sector. As of 2011, service accounts for 55%, industry 9%, and agriculture 35% of the economy of the city.

There is a dedicated industrial area in Hajipur apart from Export Promotion Park of India, Hajipur—(EPIP), maintained by Bihar Industrial Area Development Authority—(BIADA) in an area of 150 acres where many Big Brands of FMCG & Agro-based companies like PepsiCo, Britannia Industries, HUL, Godrej Consumer Products, Anmol Industries, Sudha Dairy, Wayss Ice Cream, Bansal, Treat, Avon Cycle, etc. have their manufacturing units. There are several upcoming construction projects from private and public sectors with three new bridges connecting to Patna. The Export Promotion Industrial Park, is a multiple-product export processing zone in East India developed by the Ministry of Commerce and Industry, the Government of Bihar and by the administrative body BIADA located in Hajipur, In the administrative Vaishali district, has 94 acres (38 ha; 0.147 sq mi) of land with modern infrastructure.

== Places of interest ==
=== Ramchaura Mandir ===
The Ramchaura Mandir is a Hindu Temple in the city of Hajipur, Bihar. Dedicated to Lord Ram. As per local folklore, it is said to have been in existence since the Ramayana period and Shri Ram is believed to have visited this place on his way to Janakpur, where his footprints are worshiped. The Ramchaura Mandir has a tradition of celebrating Rama Navami, on the birth anniversary of Shri Rama. A small fair is also organised on the eve of Rama Navami. Archeological objects excavated from Ramchaura are kept at the Patna Museum.

=== Pataleshwar Mandir ===
Dedicated to Lord Shiva, Pataleshwar Mandir is located at Hajipur. Since, the ancient period Shiva is believed to be in the form of Lingam here. The worship of the Shiva-Linga originated from the famous hymn in the Atharva-Veda Samhita sung in praise of the Yupa-Stambha.

=== Bateshwarnath Nath Temple ===
Bateshwar Nath Temple, Bihar Bateshwar Nath Temple is an ancient Hindu temple dedicated to Lord Shiva, located in Dhandua village, Basantpur Panchayat, Hajipur, Vaishali district, Bihar, India. The temple is situated approximately 28 km from the district headquarters of Vaishali. As per local folklore, the temple has existed since the Mughal period and is believed to have miraculously appeared at the center of a thousand-year-old banyan tree. The temple's origins are associated with an intriguing legend that suggests it was self-constructed. The temple holds a significant place in the religious and cultural landscape of the region. Every year, it hosts the Basant Panchami festival (February–March) with great enthusiasm. Additionally, a month-long fair is organized on the occasion of Mahashivratri, attracting devotees and visitors from nearby areas. Surrounded by vast agricultural fields, the temple offers a serene and spiritual atmosphere, making it a notable destination for those seeking peace and devotion. Recognizing its historical and religious significance, the Bihar Government has approved a project to develop the site into a recognized historical and tourist attraction. The temple is currently managed by Bateshwar Nath Vikash Seva Sansthan, an NGO, under the leadership of Mithilesh Kumar Singh, an advocate and the secretary of the organization.

=== Kaunhaara Ghat ===
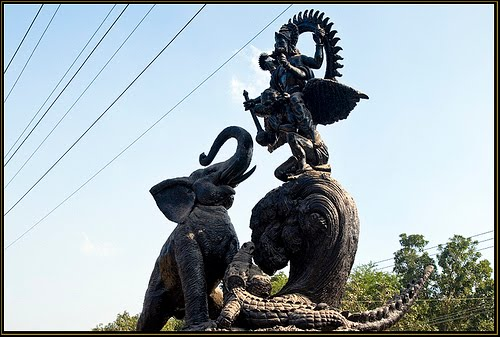
Lord Vishnu with Gaja and Graah

It is considered one of the main ghats of Ganga—Gandak, where worshiping and cremation has been performed for centuries. This ghat received its name based on an ancient legend. According to this legend, "The famous fight of Gaja (elephant)-Graah (crocodile), which is well covered in Indian scriptures, is the reason behind people asking -kaun haara. Hence the name- Kaunhara ghat. Scriptures tell that Lord Vishnu had to interfere in the fight to save his devotee Gajaraj, who was being drowned by a crocodile. Both Gaja and Graah were gandharvas. But due to some curse, they became Gaja and Graah. Lord Vishnu killed Graah to give him instant salvation, and saved the life Of Gajaraj." The depiction of fighting Gaja—Graah is an emblem for the city and is prominently shown on the Hajipur railway station's dome and other notable places.

=== Jami Masjid ===
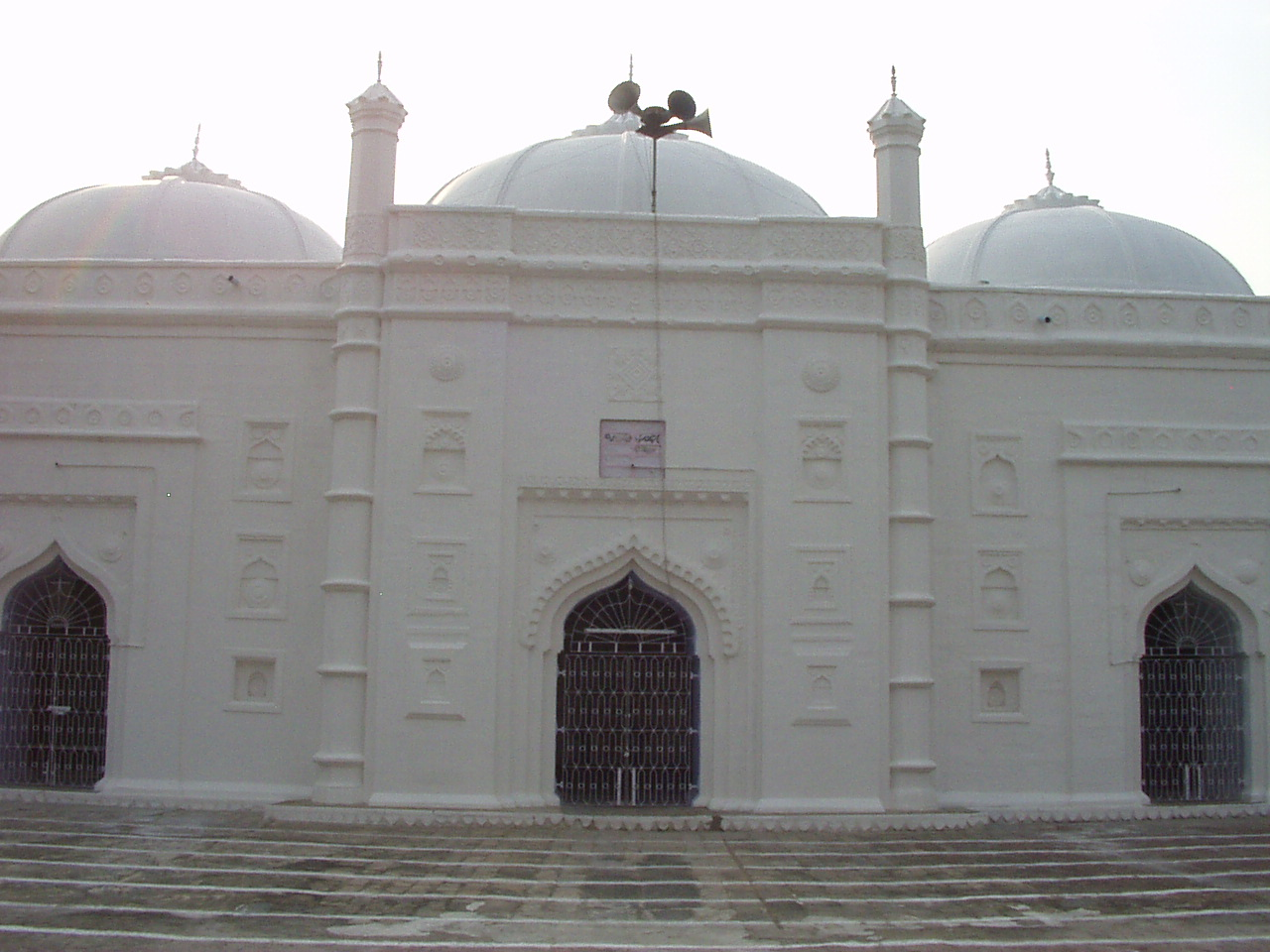
Jami Masjid

Jami Masjid is one of the states' oldest mosques erected in 1587 AD during the Mughal rule by Makhsus Shah, the contemporary governor of Bihar Sharif according to Akbarnamah. The remarkable monument is a spectacular example of Indo-Persian architecture, the central dome being larger than the others.

=== Sonepur Cattle Fair ===
Located opposite Hajipur is a place of Sonepur where the thirty-night-long Sonepur Cattle Fair is held every year starting from Kartik full moon day. The place goes lively at the onset of winter with the mass holy deep in river Gandak by Hindu at Kaun—haara Ghat. Being claimed as the biggest animal fair in Asia. Government of Bihar's Department of Rural Development, Department of Agriculture organises training and exhibitions. The visitors can stay in hotels at Hajipur or they can hire luxury Swiss cottages erected on sand dunes beside river Gandak. The tent and cottages are provided by Department of State Tourism.

=== Vaishali Mahotsava ===
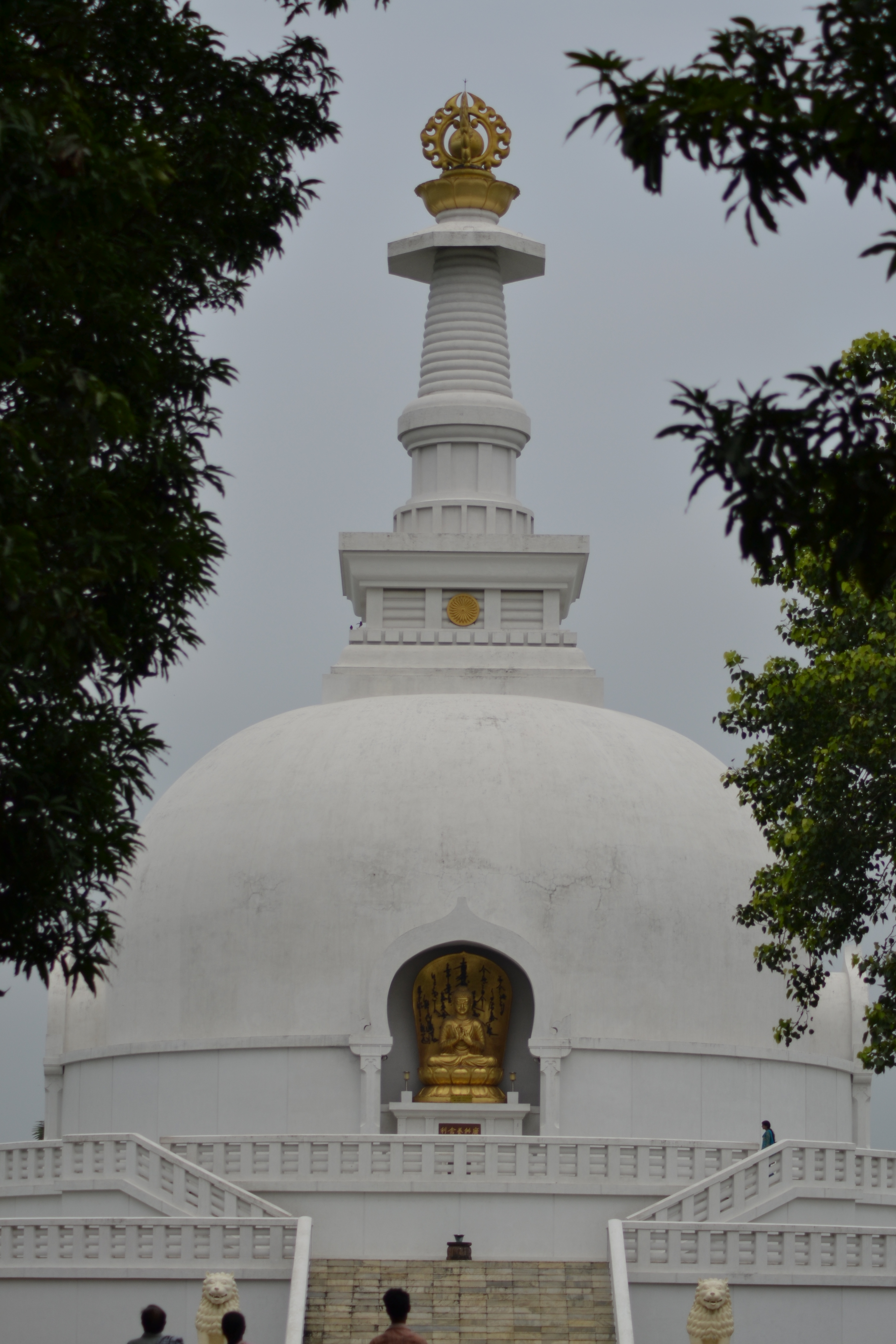
Vishwa Shanti Stupa

The ancient village of Vaishali is located 35 km North—West of Hajipur. The place can be reached by road and offers many archaeological places to see which includes Buddha Stupa, Pillars of Ashoka, Abhishek Puskarani (coronation Tank of Vajjika rulers). Vaishali Mahotsava is held every year on Baisakh Purnima (Full Moon Day of 1st Hindu Month) during mid-April to celebrate the birth anniversary of 24th Jain Tirthankar—Mahavir who was born here in the village Kundalpur, 4 km from Vaishali. The soil of this land is blessed by the visit of Buddha twice during the 3rd century BC.

Museums

Deep Narayan Singh Museum was established in 1979.

== Education ==
=== Research and management ===
- Institute of Hotel Management, Catering Technology & Applied Nutrition (IHMCT&AN) under the aegis of Govt. of India and Department of Tourism, Govt. of Bihar
- National Institute of Pharmaceutical Education and Research, Hajipur (NIPER) is an Indian public Pharmacy research university, under India's Ministry of Chemicals and Fertilizers
- Central Institute of Plastics Engineering & Technology, Hajipur (CIPET) under the Department of Chemicals and Petrochemicals, Ministry of Chemicals and Fertilizers, Government of India.

=== Colleges ===
Raj Narain College, Jamuni Lal College, Deo Chand College, Vaishali Mahila College, Intermediate Women's College, Chaurasia Raj Kishore College, JaiPrakash Evening Intermediate College, Maitreya College of Education and Management, Licchavi College of Teacher's Training, Maa Tara Institute of Health technology and Management, R.S. Sharda Devi Education College, Bihar College of Education, Bihar Industrial Training Centre, District Institute of Education and Training.

=== Schools ===
Schools in Hajipur are either government run schools or private schools. The schools are affiliated to Bihar School Examination Board (BSEB), the All-India Indian Certificate of Secondary Education (ICSE) or the Central Board of Secondary Education (CBSE) boards. Hindi and English are the primary languages of instruction. Some top Schools are — G.A Inter School, Kendriya Vidyalaya, St. Paul's High School, St. Georgia Girls' School, Indian Public School, Surajdeo Memorial School, Delhi Public School., St. John's Academy

== Notable people ==
Freedom Fighter

- Basawon Singh

Sports Person

- Kavita Roy (Former ODI Cricketer)
- Pramod Bhagat (Para-badminton Player)
- Hritik Anand (Deaflympics 2022 Badminton Gold Medalist)

Writer

- Neelakshi Singh

Politicians

- Ajay Nishad
- Awadhesh Singh
- Bashistha Narain Singh
- Brishin Patel
- Deep Narayan Singh (2nd CM of Bihar)
- Digvijay Narain Singh
- Nityanand Rai
- Pashupati Kumar Paras
- Raghuvansh Prasad Singh
- Rajeshwara Patel
- Ram Ratan Ram
- Ram Sundar Das (15th CM of Bihar)
- Ram Vilas Paswan
- Ritu Jaiswal
- Valmiki Choudhary
- Chirag Paswan

== Sports ==
- Akshaywat Rai Stadium
- Basawan Singh Stadium is a public indoor stadium inviting quotation for planning and development under Information & Public relation department, Government of Bihar.

== Transport and connectivity ==
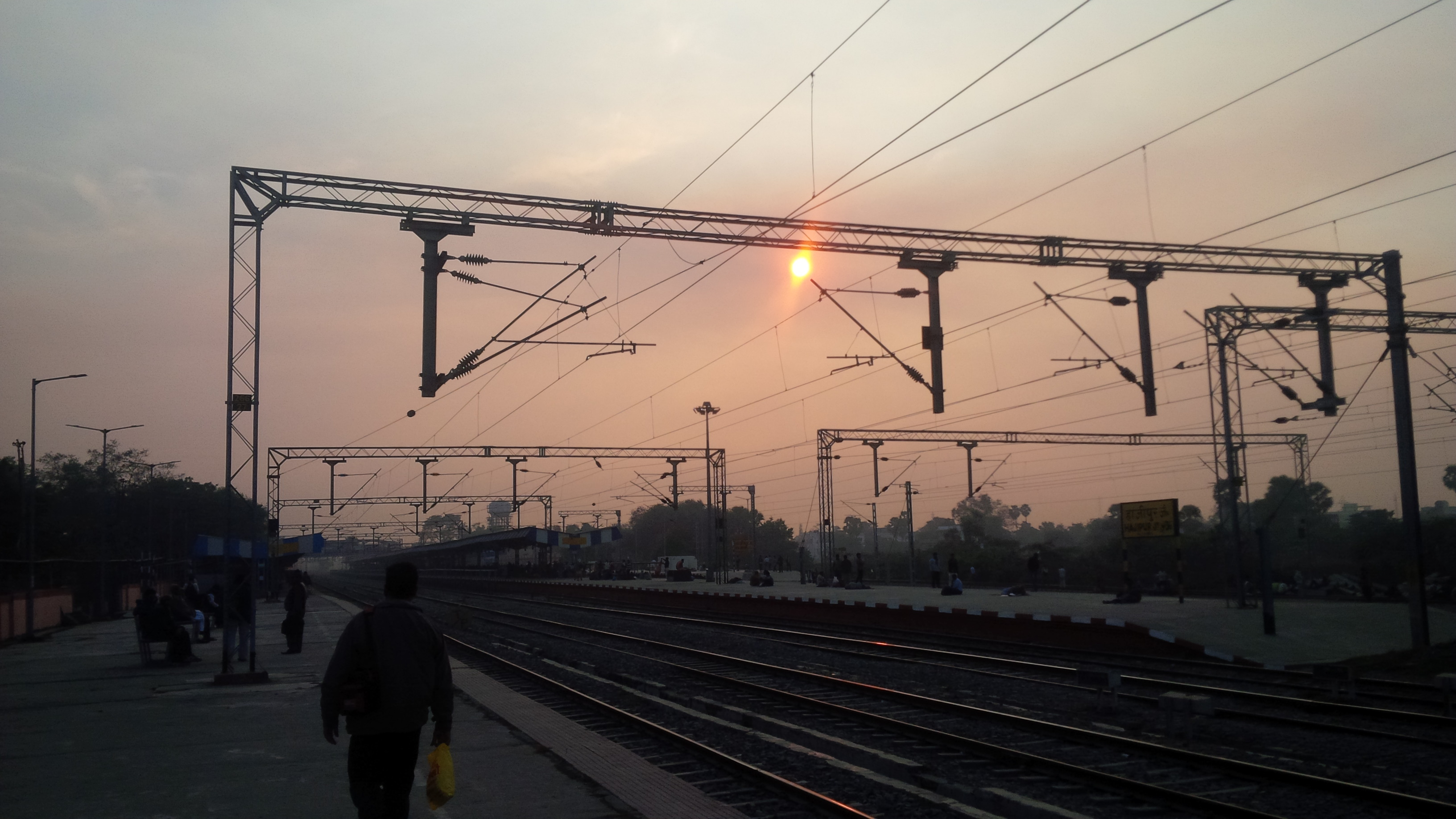
Hajipur Junction

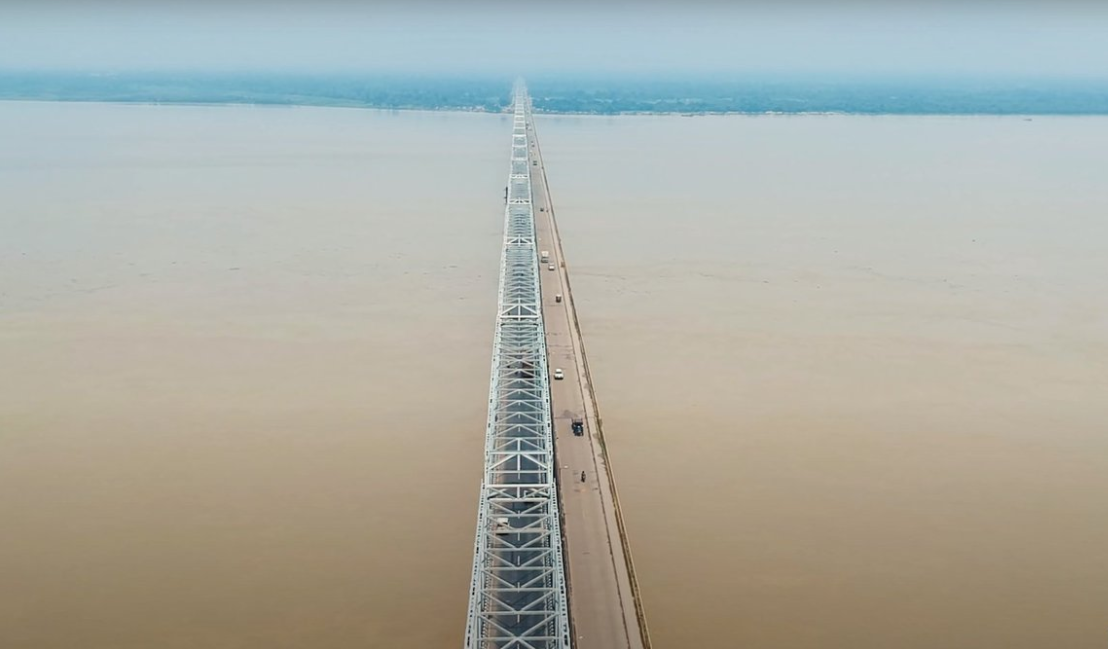
Mahatma Gandhi Setu

Hajipur city has a modern railway zonal office. It is the headquarters of the East Central Railway zone of the Indian Railways. Hajipur Junction is directly connected to most of the major cities in India. Public transportation is provided for by buses, auto rickshaws and local trains. BSRTC has started city bus service on Hajipur via Patna. Luxury bus service in Hajipur running via NH-31 connects several neighbouring cities is provided by the Bihar State Road Transport Corporation. Auto rickshaws are a popular mode of transportation. App based cab service is available.

Asia's longest river bridge, the Mahatma Gandhi Setu (built 1982), is in Hajipur and connects the city to Patna across the Ganga. The four lane prestressed RCC bridge was commissioned into service during the year 1982.

The city is primarily served by Lok Nayak Jayaprakash Airport, Patna (PAT) - which is just 21.2 km (13.2 miles) SW or an hour drive from Hajipur.

Hajipur is connected to other parts of India through national and state highways. Hajipur is well connected with roads to various major cities of Bihar like Patna, Sonpur, Vaishali, Muzaffarpur, Samastipur, and Chhapra. The major highways are-

- NH 31 touches the city and connects it to Chhapra which further joins Ghazipur city in UP. NH 31 starts from Patna and is connected further with Gaya and BodhGaya through state highway.
- NH 22 connects Hajipur to Sonbarsa (Nepal border) via Muzaffarpur and Sitamarhi
- NH 322 Starts from Hajipur to Musrigharari (Samastipur) via Jandaha
- SH 74 connects Hajipur to Lalganj, Vaishali.
- SH 49 connects Hajipur to Mahua, Tajpur, Samastipur
- SH 93 connects Hajipur to Mahnar, Mohiuddinagar
- The Kacchi Dargah–Bidupur Bridge was inaugurated in two phases.

The first phase, connecting Kacchi Dargah in Patna to Raghopur Diara, was opened to the public on 23 June 2025 by Chief Minister Nitish Kumar.

The second phase, connecting Raghopur to Bidupur in Vaishali district, was inaugurated in August 2025, making the entire six-lane bridge fully operational.

After completion, it became the longest bridge of its type in India.

== Media ==
Hindi and English newspapers are easily available in the city, including Dainik Jagran, Hindustan, Prabhat Khabar, Dainik Bhaskar, The Times of India, Hindustan Times, The Hindu, The Economic Times and The Indian Express. There is also the Hindi and English mixed newspaper tabloid Inext.

TV programming is provided by regional news channels like Zee Bihar, Kashish News, Sahara Samay Channel, News18 Bihar, DD Bihar. There are several news programmes broadcast by local cable operators in city areas and all renowned channels are broadcast in each corner of the city areas.

Hajipur has the following FM radio stations—

- AIR FM Rainbow 101.6 FM
- Vividh Bharati Patna (All India Radio) is broadcast on 102.5 FM.

=== Private FM stations (Patna) ===
No.	Name	Frequency	Language
01	Radio City	91.1 FM	Hindi
02	Red FM	93.5 FM	Hindi
03	Big FM	95.0 FM	Hindi & Bhojpuri
04	Radio Mirchi	98.3 FM	Hindi

== Utility services ==
Electricity supply to the city is regulated and distributed by the Bihar State Power Holding Company Limited. The city gets electricity from North Bihar Power Distribution Company Limited which is controlled by Bihar State Electricity Board.

Direct–to–home (DTH) is available via DD Free Dish, Airtel digital TV, Dish TV, Tata Play, d2h, Sun Direct and Independent TV and all Cable operators.

Hajipur has its own home network of the Bharat Sanchar Nigam Limited (BSNL), India's state-owned telecom and internet services provider. Both Global System for Mobile Communications (GSM) mobile services are available. Apart from telecom, BSNL also provides broadband internet service. Among private enterprises, Bharti Airtel, Reliance Jio, Vodafone Idea and Tata Teleservices are the leading telephone and cell phone service providers in the city.

== See also ==
- Hajipur Junction railway station
- Hajipur (Lok Sabha constituency)
- Hajipur (Vidhan Sabha constituency)
- List of villages in Hajipur block
- Hajipur (community development block)
