= Sundarkhauli =

Village in Muzaffarpur, Bihar, India

- Village
- Location in Bihar, India Sundarkhauli (India)
- Coordinates: 26.2732555°N 85.5977152°E
- Country: India
- State: Bihar
- District: Muzaffarpur
- Block: Aurai

Government
  - Type: Gram Panchayat
  - Body: Mathurapur Buzurg Gram Panchayat

Population (2011)
  - Total: 1,791

Languages
  - Official: Hindi

Literacy
  - Literacy: 58.3%
- PIN: 843321
- Vehicle registration: BR-06

Sundarkhauli is a village in the Aurai block of Muzaffarpur district in the Indian state of Bihar. It falls under the Mathurapur Buzurg Gram Panchayat.

== Geography ==
Sundarkhauli is located at 26.2732555°N 85.5977152°E in the Aurai block of Muzaffarpur district, Bihar. The village is situated approximately 9 kilometers from the sub-district headquarters, Aurai, and about 55 kilometers from the district headquarters, Muzaffarpur.

== Nearby villages ==
- Mathurapur Buzurg
- Basua

== Demographics ==
According to the 2011 Census of India:

- Total population: 1,791
- Males: 973
- Females: 818
- Sex ratio: 841 females per 1,000 males
- Children aged 0–6: 407 (22.72% of total population)
- Child sex ratio: 939

== Infrastructure ==
- Education: Educational facilities in Sundarkhauli are available from 1st to 8th class. For higher education (10th–12th class), students attend schools in Mathurapur Buzurg or other areas of Aurai block.
- Postal code: 843321
- Vehicle registration: BR-06
- Basic amenities: Electricity and drinking water are available.

== See also ==
- List of villages in Bihar
