= Saghari Rampur =

Village in Muzaffarpur, Bihar, India

Saghari Saghari Rampur
- Village
- Location in Bihar, India Saghari (India)
- Coordinates: 26°17′1″N 85°35′59″E
- Country: India
- State: Bihar
- District: Muzaffarpur
- Block: Aurai
- Elevation: 65 m (213 ft)

Population (2011)
  - Total: 3,026

Languages
  - Official: Hindi
  - Spoken: Maithili, Urdu, Vajjika, Bhojpuri
- Time zone: UTC+5:30 (IST)
- PIN: 843312
- ISO 3166 code: IN-BR
- Nearest cities: Muzaffarpur, Kanti, Sitamarhi, Sheohar

Saghari Rampur is a village in Aurai block in Muzaffarpur district in the India state of Bihar. Rampur Shambhuta is the gram panchayat of Saghari village. It is located about 45 km away from Muzaffarpur, the district headquarters.

== Demographics ==
The total population of the village is 3,026 as per the 2011 Census. The population is composed of 1,593 males and 1,433 females. Child Population:

The village has a significant child population (age 0-6), totaling 603 children, which constitutes 19.93% of the total population. Sex Ratio:

The Average Sex Ratio of the village is 900, which is lower than the Bihar state average of 918. The Child Sex Ratio in Saghari Rampur is 908, also lower than the Bihar average of 935.

The literacy rate in Saghari Rampur is 60.17%, which is slightly lower compared to the overall Bihar state literacy rate of 61.80%. Male literacy in the village stands at 67.03%, while female literacy is lower at 52.53%.
