= Ajit Singh (Bihar politician) =

Indian politician

Er. Ajeet Kumar
- In office February 2005 – 2015
- Preceded by: Gulam Jilani Warsi
- Succeeded by: Ashok Kumar Choudhary
- Constituency: Kanti
- Incumbent
- Assumed office November 2025
- Preceded by: Mohammad Israil Mansuri

Personal details
- Born: Er. Ajeet Kumar
- Party: Janta Dal United
- Other political affiliations: Janata Dal (United); Lok Janshakti Party; NSUI; Bhumihar bhramin samajik frunt Bhartiya Janata party's janta dal United
- Children: Pratyush Pranjal
- Parent: Gaya Chaudhary (Teacher) (father)
- Education: B.Sc. Engineering (Civil)
- Alma mater: Bihar University
- Profession: Social Service

Er. Ajeet Kumar is an Indian politician. He was elected to the Bihar Legislative Assembly from Kanti in the February 2005, October 2005 and 2010 Bihar Legislative Assembly election as a member of the Janata Dal (United). He joined Hindustani Awam Morcha when former Chief Minister of Bihar, Jitan Ram Manjhi, who left the Janata Dal (United) along with 18 others to form the party following the 2015 Bihar political crisis. He lost Kanti seat in 2015 Bihar Legislative Assembly election.
