= Nargi-Jagdish =

Kolwara
- village
- Country: India
- State: Bihar
- District: Muzafarpur

Languages
  - Official: Maithili, Hindi
- Time zone: UTC+5:30 (IST)
- ISO 3166 code: IN-BR
- Lok Sabha constituency: vaishali
- Vidhan Sabha constituency: Muzaffarpur

Nargi-Jagdish is an Indian hamlet. It is also known as Greenly Village. It is located in Narangi Jiwnath Panchayat of the Saraiya block, within Muzaffarpur district, Bihar state, India.

Village is known for its foliage, and is surrounded by Mango, Lichi, and Banana trees and grass fields. These grass fields are home to many wild animals, such as jackals, foxes, Nilgais, and venomous snakes, including the cobra. There are many small ponds all around the village.

Agriculture is the main occupation, but there has been an increasing trend of working outside the state, mainly in Delhi, Rajasthan, and Assam.

Nargi-jagdish is directly linked by road to main cities, including Muzaffarpur (22 km), Vaishali (16 km), and Sharaiya (10 km).

In 1991, the population of Nargi Jiwnath Panchayat was 6709. Its main crops include rice, wheat, maize, and pulses, and its inhabitants are chiefly employed by agriculture, fisheries, and horticulture.
