= Basua =

Village in Muzaffarpur, Bihar, India

- Village
- Location in Bihar, India Basua (India)
- Coordinates: 26.2681539°N 85.6143908°E
- Country: India
- State: Bihar
- District: Muzaffarpur
- Block: Aurai

Government
  - Type: Gram Panchayat
  - Body: Mathurapur Buzurg Gram Panchayat

Area
  - Total: 7.23 km^{2} (2.79 sq mi)

Population (2011)
  - Total: 3,113
  - Density: 431/km^{2} (1,120/sq mi)

Languages
  - Official: Hindi, Urdu
- Time zone: UTC+5:30 (IST)
- PIN: 843321
- Vehicle registration: BR-06

Basua is a village located in the Aurai block of Muzaffarpur district in the Indian state of Bihar. It falls under the administrative jurisdiction of the Mathurapur Buzurg Gram Panchayat.

== Geography ==
Basua covers an area of about 7.23 km². The village is part of the Gangetic plain region of Bihar and has fertile alluvial soil, supporting agriculture as the primary occupation.

== Demographics ==
As per the Census of India 2011, Basua had a total population of 3,113 people across 731 households. Of the total population, 1,656 were male and 1,457 were female.

- Children aged 0–6 years: 500 (16.06% of total population)
- Sex ratio: 880 females per 1000 males (lower than Bihar average of 918)
- Child sex ratio: 786 (below Bihar average of 935)
- Literacy rate: 71.34% (higher than Bihar state average of 61.8%)

 * Male literacy: 78.13%  
 * Female literacy: 63.78%  

- Scheduled Castes: 16.58%
- Scheduled Tribes: Nil

== Economy ==
Agriculture is the mainstay of the local economy. As per 2011 census data, 1,048 villagers were engaged in work activities. Out of these:

- 72.71% were classified as main workers (employed for more than 6 months)
- 27.29% were marginal workers (employed for less than 6 months)
- 292 persons were cultivators (owner or co-owner of agricultural land)
- 218 were agricultural labourers

== Transport ==
Basua is connected to nearby towns and villages by local roads. The nearest railway facility is Muzaffarpur Junction, which links the village to major cities in Bihar and beyond.

== Education ==
The village has access to primary and secondary schools in nearby localities. For higher education, students typically travel to Aurai and Muzaffarpur town. Literacy levels indicate a relatively better educational status compared to the state average.

== Postal services ==
The village is served by the Basua branch post office under Katra sub-district, Muzaffarpur. The PIN code for Basua is 843321.

== See also ==
- Villages in Bihar
