= Barakapur =

Village in Bihar

Coordinates: 26°00′58″N 85°22′47″E

Barakapur is a village in Muzaffarpur district, Bihar state, India. According to the 2011 Indian census, its population was 6,386 people (2,839 males, 3,997 females).
