= Kubauli =

Kubauli Dhala
- Village
- Location in Bihar, India Kubauli (India)
- Coordinates: 26.033326°N 84.998899°E
- Country: India
- State: Bihar
- District: Muzaffarpur District
- Block: Paroo
- Post office: Jaimal Dumri
- Panchayat: Chintamanpur
- Established: 1875

Government
  - Type: Mukhiya
  - Mukhiya: Savatri Devi

Area
  - Total: 1.36 km^{2} (0.53 sq mi)
- Elevation: 60 m (200 ft)

Population
  - Total: 2,260.
  - Density: 1,660/km^{2} (4,300/sq mi)

Languages
  - Official: Urdu, Hindi, Maithili, Bajjika.
- Time zone: UTC+5:30 (IST)
- Postal code: 843107
- Telephone code: 06223
- ISO 3166 code: IN-BR
- Vehicle registration: BR-06
- Literacy: 65.68 %

Kubauli,, also known as Kubauli Dhala, is a village located in the Muzaffarpur District of Bihar state, India. The village, situated about 47 km west of Muzaffarpur city, has a population of around 2,260.

The village is situated near the Gandak River, which flows from the Someshwar Hills in Nepal of the Himalayas. It is administered by the Chintawanpur panchayat of Paroo block.

== Demographics ==
According to the Population Census of 2011, 1,231 of the village residents are male while 1,029 are female. The village has two major religions – Islam & Hinduism.

== Education ==
Kubauli has a higher literacy rate compared to the Bihar average. In 2011, the literacy rate of Kubauli village was 65.68%; compared to 61.80% of Bihar. The rate of male literacy stands at 75.29% while the rate of female literacy is 54.46%. There is an Urdu primary school in the village.

== Climate ==
Kubauli's climate is classified as warm and temperate. The summers have a large amount of rainfall, while the winters have very little. This location is classified as Cwg by Köppen. The average annual temperature is 25.2 °C in Kubauli. The rainfall averages 1046 mm. The lowest amount of rainfall occurs in December, an average of 2 mm. Most of the precipitation falls in July, averaging 287 mm. The temperatures are on average highest in May, at around 31.1 °C. January is the coldest month, with temperatures averaging 16.5 °C. The variation in the precipitation between the driest and wettest months is 285 mm. Throughout the year, temperatures vary by 14.6 °C.

== Economy ==
Kubauli's main export are watermelons. The land use around Kubauli is mainly agricultural and horticultural. While watermelon and mangoes are abundantly grown, principal crops also include rice, wheat, pulses, jute, maize and oil seeds. Vegetables like cauliflower, cabbage, onion, tomato, radish, carrot, and beetroot, among others, are also grown. Sugarcane, potato and barley are some of the non-cereal crops grown.

The main livestock of the village is poultry.

== Mosque and Temples ==
There is a mosque situated near the aforementioned primary school, and there is a temple located near the bus stand.
