= Pokharaira =

- Village
- Location in Bihar, India
- Coordinates: 26°04′16″N 85°12′12.4″E
- Country: India
- State: Bihar
- District: Muzaffarpur

Languages
  - Official: Bhojpuri, Hindi
- Time zone: UTC+5:30 (IST)
- Telephone code: 06223 postal_code = 843106

Pokharaira is a village in Muzaffarpur, Muzaffarpur, in the Indian state of Bihar.

== Population ==
In 2001, the population was 10,865. It is estimated that 97% are Hindu and 3% Muslim. The literacy rate is 64%, including 38.94% female and 66.51% male.

== Climate ==
The climate is semi-tropical monsoon. The months of May to June are hot and December to January are cold.

== Crops ==
The village has many Litchi and Mango plantations.

== Utilities ==
Electricity and potable water are available from private firms and mostly hand pumps.

== Places of interest ==
Visitors explore Narsingh Sthan and the Kanu temple of Palwaiya Dham and mine block.

== Transport ==
There is no public transportation in the village.

== Education ==
The state operates a teacher training School. The government operates RPS Government 10+2 School, three primary schools and two middle schools.

== Health Centre ==
A primary health center and hospital are there.
