= Raj Khand =

Village in Bihar, India

- Village
- Location within Bihar Location within India
- Coordinates: 26°15′05″N 85°40′20″E
- Country: India
- State: Bihar
- District: Muzaffarpur
- Block: Aurai
- Elevation: 17 m (56 ft)

Population (2011)
  - Total: 19,296
- Time zone: UTC+5:30 (IST)
- PIN: 843312

Raj Khand is a village in Aurai Block, Muzaffarpur District, Bihar, India. It is located on Northern Bihar, about 45 kilometres northeast of the district capital Muzaffarpur, and 14 kilometres southeast of the block capital Aurai. As of the year 2011, it is home to 19,296 inhabitants.

== Geography ==
Raj Khand is located on the north of Bagmati River. To its north is the village of Pahsaul; to its east is the village of Inglish Az Rakbe Bhagwanpur; to its south is the village of Khangura Dih urf Lakmipur; and to its west is the village of Chak Mohiuddin urf Bishunpatti. Majhila Pond is in the northwest of the village. Its average elevation is at 17 metres above the sea level.

== Climate ==
Raj Khand has a Humid Subtropical Climate (Cwa). Its wettest month is July, with an average rainfall of 364 mm; and the driest month is November, with an average rainfall of 4 mm.

Climate data for Raj Khand
Month	Jan	Feb	Mar	Apr	May	Jun	Jul	Aug	Sep	Oct	Nov	Dec	Year
Mean daily maximum °C (°F)	22.3 (72.1)	26.2 (79.2)	32.2 (90.0)	36.5 (97.7)	36 (97)	34.3 (93.7)	31.6 (88.9)	31.7 (89.1)	31 (88)	30 (86)	27.9 (82.2)	24 (75)	30.3 (86.6)
Daily mean °C (°F)	16.2 (61.2)	19.7 (67.5)	25.3 (77.5)	29.8 (85.6)	30.4 (86.7)	29.9 (85.8)	28.3 (82.9)	28.2 (82.8)	27.5 (81.5)	25.5 (77.9)	21.9 (71.4)	17.8 (64.0)	25.0 (77.1)
Mean daily minimum °C (°F)	10.4 (50.7)	13.3 (55.9)	18.1 (64.6)	23 (73)	25 (77)	25.9 (78.6)	25.8 (78.4)	25.7 (78.3)	24.8 (76.6)	21.3 (70.3)	16.1 (61.0)	12 (54)	20.1 (68.2)
Average rainfall mm (inches)	12 (0.5)	16 (0.6)	16 (0.6)	24 (0.9)	70 (2.8)	204 (8.0)	364 (14.3)	290 (11.4)	241 (9.5)	62 (2.4)	4 (0.2)	6 (0.2)	1,309 (51.4)
Source: Climate-Data.org

== Demographics ==
In 2011, the village has a total of 4,141 households and 19,296 residents. Among all the residents, 10,224 are male and 9,072 are female. The total literacy rate is at 44.36%, with 5,299 of the male population and 3,260 of the female population being literate. The census location code is 228985.
