= Gulam Jilani Warsi =

Indian politician

Gulam Jilani Warsi, Ghulam Jeelani Warsi, is an Indian politician. He has been a member of the Bihar Legislative Assembly from Kanti Assembly constituency from 2000 to February 2005 as a representative of the Rashtriya Janata Dal. He supported Mohammad Israil Mansuri, a candidate of Rashtriya Janata Dal, in the 2020 Bihar Assembly election.

Warsi fought 2000 Bihar Assembly election from Kanti Assembly constituency as a representative of Rashtriya Janata Dal. He won against Ajit Kumar of Ajeya Bharat Party who stood second and Harendra Kumar of Samata Party who stood at the third position.
