= Arun Kumar Singh (politician) =

Indian politician (born 1970)

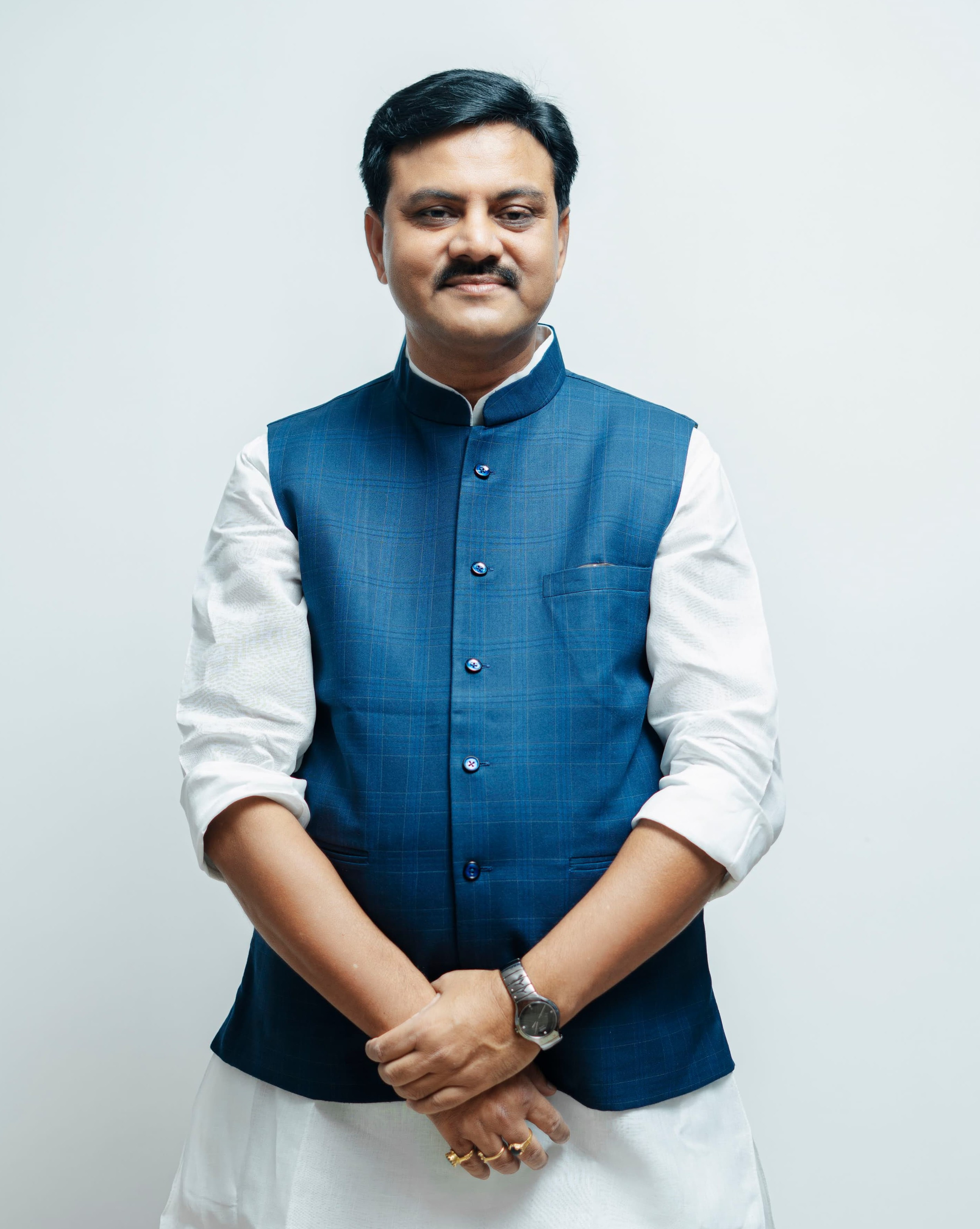

Member of the Bihar Legislative Assembly
- Incumbent
- Assumed office 2020
- Preceded by: Nand Kumar Rai
- Constituency: Baruraj Assembly constituency

Personal details
- Born: August 2, 1970 (age 55) Baburban, Muzaffarpur, Bihar, India
- Party: Bharatiya Janata Party
- Spouse: Anjani Singh
- Children: 3
- Education: Ph.D., M.A., MBA
- Alma mater: Babasaheb Bhimrao Ambedkar Bihar University, LN Mishra College, Muzaffarpur
- Occupation: Politician

Arun Kumar Singh (born 2 August 1970) is an Indian politician from Bihar and a member of the Bharatiya Janata Party (BJP). He serves as a Member of the Bihar Legislative Assembly from the Baruraj Assembly constituency in Muzaffarpur district and is currently in his second consecutive term, having been re-elected in the 2025 Bihar Legislative Assembly elections.

== Early life and family ==
Arun Kumar Singh was born on 2 August 1970 in Baburban, Muzaffarpur district, Bihar. He hails from a politically influential family. His grandfather, the late Yamuna Singh, was a freedom fighter and a former two-time Member of the Bihar Legislative Assembly from the Baruraj constituency. His father, the late Brij Kishor Singh, was an MLA from Baruraj (2010–2015).

== Education ==
Singh holds a Doctorate (Ph.D.), a Master of Arts (M.A.), and a Master of Business Administration (MBA). He completed his higher education at Babasaheb Bhimrao Ambedkar Bihar University and LN Mishra College, Muzaffarpur.

== Political career ==
He started his political journey as a Ward Parishad (Ward Member) from 2002 to 2007 in Muzaffarpur, where he focused on road repairs, public sanitation, education, and welfare initiatives.

In the 2015 assembly elections, Singh contested from the Baruraj constituency as a BJP candidate but lost to Nand Kumar Rai of the Rashtriya Janata Dal by a narrow margin of 4,909 votes.

In 2020, Singh contested again from Baruraj and defeated the same opponent with a remarkable margin of 43,654 votes, securing 51% of the total votes polled. He received 87,407 votes and marked a significant political turnaround in the region.

He was re-elected to the Bihar Legislative Assembly in 2025 as a candidate of the Bharatiya Janata Party (BJP), securing 96,879 votes and defeating his nearest rival by a margin of 29,052 votes.

== Electoral Record ==
Arun Kumar Singh's electoral record

S. No.	Year	Political Party Name	Win/Defeat
1	2015	Bharatiya Janata Party (BJP)	Defeated
2	2020	Bharatiya Janata Party (BJP)	Won
3	2025	Bharatiya Janata Party (BJP)	Won
