= Muzaffarpur Municipal Corporation =

Civic body governing Muzaffarpur, Bihar, India

Muzaffarpur Municipal Corporation मुजफ्फरपुर नगर निगम
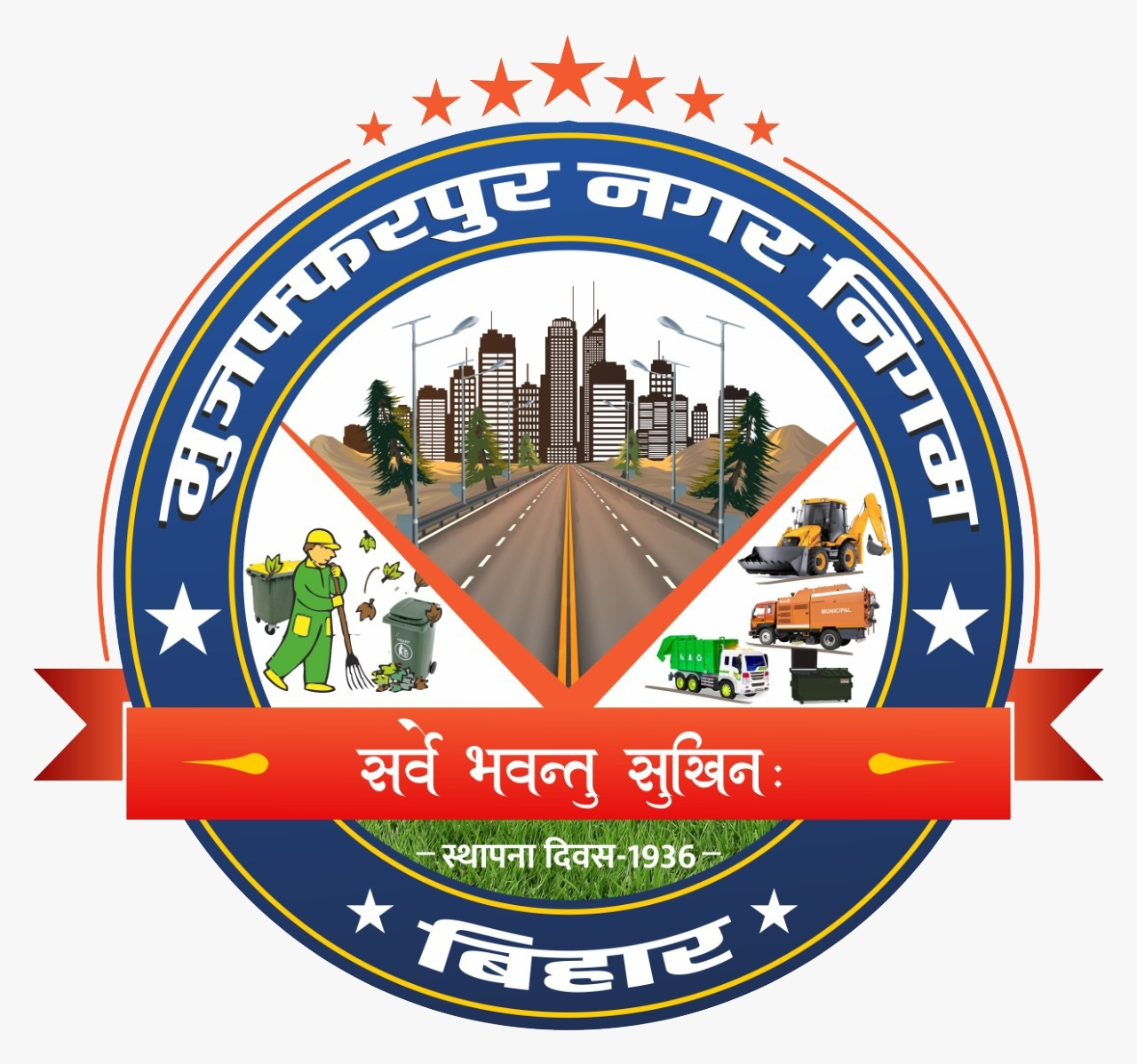

Type
- Type: Municipal corporation

History
- Founded: 1936; 90 years ago

Leadership
- Mayor: Nirmala Sahu
- Deputy Mayor: Dr. Monalisa
- Municipal Commissioner: Vikram Virkar (IAS)
- Seats: 49

Elections
- Last election: 2022

Meeting place
- Municipal Office, Sutapatti, Pokharia, Muzaffarpur, Bihar

Website
- mymmc.org

Muzaffarpur Municipal Corporation or (मुजफ्फरपुर नगर निगम), is the civic body that governs Muzaffarpur, a city of Bihar in India. Municipal Corporation mechanism in India was introduced during British Rule with formation of municipal corporation in Madras (Chennai) in 1688, later followed by municipal corporations in Bombay (Mumbai) and Calcutta (Kolkata) by 1762. Muzaffarpur Municipal Corporation consists of democratically elected members, is headed by a Mayor, and administers the city's infrastructure, public services, and supplies. Muzaffarpur has been selected in Smart Cities Mission under Government of India. Hence, it also implement scheme and overseas projects needed for Urban Development.

== Muzaffarpur Smart City Limited ==
Muzaffarpur Smart City is part of the Government of India's Smart Cities Mission, aimed at transforming Muzaffarpur into a modern, sustainable, and citizen-friendly urban centre. The initiative focuses on improving infrastructure, enhancing living conditions, and promoting economic growth. Key areas of development include efficient waste management, improved water supply and sanitation, better urban mobility, affordable housing, and robust information technology connectivity. Muzaffarpur was selected for the mission through a competitive process.

Initially, Muzaffarpur was allocated ₹1,580 crore for various projects under the Smart Cities Mission; however, this amount was later reduced to ₹982 crore.

The headquarters of Muzaffarpur Smart City Limited is located at the ICCC Building, Sutapatti, Pokhraira, Muzaffarpur, Bihar, India.

=== Project Details Under MSCL ===
Smart City Projects in Muzaffarpur
S.No.	Project	Completion (%)	Status
1	Redevelopment of Sikandarpur Stadium as Multi Purpose Sports Stadium	50	Running
2	Beautification of Sikandarpur Lake Front in Muzaffarpur	77	Running
3	Construction of Municipal Shopping Mart at Tilak Maidan in Muzaffarpur	100	Completed
4	Master System Integrator (MSI) for Integrated Command Control Centre (ICCC) for MSCL	100	Completed
5	Renovation of Town Hall in Muzaffarpur	100	Completed
6	Construction of ICCC Building in MRDA(D) Campus in Muzaffarpur	100	Completed
7	Re-Development of City Park, Muzaffarpur	100	Completed
8	Development of Azadi ka Amrit Mahotsav Park in Muzaffarpur	100	Completed
9	Re-Development of Jubba Sahni Park, Muzaffarpur	100	Completed
10	Re-Development of Indira Park, Muzaffarpur	100	Completed
11	Junction improvement works at 6 junctions in Muzaffarpur	100	Completed
12	Development of Sewerage System	94.5	Running
13	UG Main Storm Water Drainage	94.5	Running
14	Redevelopment of MIT Spinal Road from Railway Station (Dharamshala Chowk) to Bairiya Chowk via Laxmi Chowk, Muzaffarpur	96	Running
15	Re-Development of Road from Adarsh Nagar Thana to Harisabha Chowk via Kalyani Chowk at Muzaffarpur	100	Completed
16	Re-Development of Peripheral Road from Railway Station (Dharamshala Chowk) to Akhara Ghat Bridge via Tower Chowk, Muzaffarpur	93	Running
17	Face Lifting of CBD area along Major Roads in ABD Area of Muzaffarpur Smart City	94	Running
18	Construction of 25 Smart Mini Bus and E-Rickshaw stop sheds in Muzaffarpur	100	Completed
19	RO Water Point at different junctions	0	Not Started
20	Construction of Integrated Bus Terminal at Bairiya, Muzaffarpur	0	Not Started
21	Conducting Public awareness campaigns and workshops	100	Completed

Legend:

Colour	Status
	Completed
	Running
	Not Started

== Greater Muzaffarpur (proposed) ==
Greater Muzaffarpur refers to a proposed expansion of the municipal limits of the Muzaffarpur Municipal Corporation (MMC) in Muzaffarpur district, Bihar, India. The proposal aims to accommodate the city's projected urban growth over the next 30 years by extending the existing municipal jurisdiction and incorporating adjoining rural and peri-urban areas.

=== Overview ===
- Proposing authority: Muzaffarpur Municipal Corporation
- Gram panchayats proposed: 19
- Revenue villages proposed: 56
- Blocks (anchals) covered: Mushahari, Kurhani, Marwan and Kanti
- Additional areas included: Madhopur Susta and Lashkaripur

Initially, the proposal covered 16 gram panchayats and 47 villages. It was later revised and expanded to include 19 panchayats and 56 villages.

The proposal was prepared under the supervision of the Municipal Commissioner Vikram Viskar, with technical planning support from Town Planner Adya Kunwar, in coordination with the Circle Officers (COs) and Block Development Officers (BDOs) of Kanti, Marwan, Kurhani and Mushahari blocks. As part of the planning process, the Municipal Commissioner conducted field inspections of all villages proposed for inclusion.

After approval by the Department of Urban Development and Housing, Government of Bihar, the proposal will be published for public objections and claims, followed by notification in the official gazette. Final approval is expected around the time of the Bihar Panchayat elections.

=== Proposed Panchayats, Blocks, and Villages Proposed for Inclusion ===
Block / Anchal	Panchayat	Revenue Villages	Total Villages
Kanti	Dadar Panchayat	Dadar	1
Kanti	Kolhua Panchayat	Kolhua, Wairiya, Paigambarpur, Sikandarpur	4
Kanti	Sadanpur Panchayat	Sadanpur	1
Kanti	Damodarpur Panchayat	Damodarpur, Chak Murmur	2
Marwan	Shubhankarpur Panchayat	Fatehpur Murfadpur, Chainpur	2
Kurhani	Kurhani Panchayat	Dariyapur, Kafen, Madheel	3
Mushahari	Mushahari Panchayat	Bhikhanpur, Rasulpur Saiyed Salem, Rasulpur Saiyed Wajid, Sahbazpur, Chak Gazi, Sahbazpur Salem	6
Muradpur Dulla	Muradpur Dulla Panchayat	Ahiyapur, Ganeshpur, Raghopur	3
Sheikhpur	Sheikhpur Panchayat	Sheikhpur, Nazirpur	2
Bada Jagannath	Bada Jagannath Panchayat	Bada Jagannath	1
Abdul Nagar	Abdul Nagar alias Madhopur Panchayat	Chandwara, Chhota Bhagwatipur, Chak Mohammad, Saraiya, Chak Mustafapur, Sahdulapur, Bhagwatipur, Shahpur	8
Susta	Susta Panchayat	Bakhri Chandan, Harpur, Fatehpur, Baidhnathpur, Abdul Nagar alias Madhopur	5
Sherpur Majhauli	Sherpur Majhauli Panchayat	Dharmdas, Ratwara, Sherpur alias Narayanpur, Anant, Sherpur	5
Bhagwanpur	Bhagwanpur Panchayat	Badhanpura alias Brahmpura, Bhagwanpur	2
Patahi	Patahi Panchayat	Patahi alias Patahi Roop	1
Majhauli Khetal	Majhauli Khetal Panchayat	Dumri alias Damodarpur, Sahjahanpur, Gibarsahi alias Govardhanpur, Majhauli Khetal	4
Khabra	Khabra Panchayat	Barmatpur alias Bishanpur Kharkasen, Khabra alias Kiratpur, Gurdas, Gantripur, Kazi Mohammadpur, Bhikhanpur Deh, Chak Ahmad, Bhikhanpur Adam	8
Rohua	Rohua Panchayat	Kothiya Dakhili, Kothiya Apuch	2
Kanhauli	Kanhauli Panchayat	Dhanhar, Chhapra	2
Total			56 villages in 19 Panchayats

== History of MMMC ==
In 1864, Muzaffarpur was declared as Municipality which later on in the year 1981 was upgraded as Municipal Corporation. The first elected body of the Municipal Corporation was constituted in the year 2002. Samir Kumar was the first elected Mayor of Muzaffarpur. Vivek Kumar was the first elected Dy Mayor. The area of Muzaffarpur Municipal Corporation is approx. 32 km^{2} spread into 49 wards.

== Budget & Finanace ==
Every year in the month of March, the Muzaffarpur Municipal Corporation presents its budget for the development and services in Muzaffarpur city.

=== Budget 2025-2026 ===
Muzaffarpur Municipal Corporation has approved a budget of ₹801.01 crore for the financial year 2025–26. The budget was approved in a special meeting chaired by Mayor Nirmala Devi, where committee members made some amendments before giving their approval.

Key Highlights of the Budget:

- Total Estimated Income: ₹801.01 crore
- Total Estimated Expenditure: ₹793.65 crore
- Net Profit: ₹7.76 crore
- Property Tax Collection: ₹69 crore
- Trade License Fee Collection: ₹2.5 crore

key features of Muzaffarpur Municipal Corporation's budget:

- Club Road Auditorium: ₹22 crore allocated for constructing a high-capacity auditorium.
- Wedding Zone and Commercial Complex: ₹11.50 crore allocated for construction.
- Animal Cremation Center: ₹10 crore allocated for construction, and ₹90 lakh for cremating unclaimed bodies.
- Emergency Accident Service: ₹5 crore allocated.
- Municipal Petrol Pump, CNG Station, and EV Charging Station: ₹1.50 crore allocated.
- Paperless Initiative: ₹2.5 crore allocated to make the municipal corporation paperless.

=== Previous Years Budget ===
BUDGET(2024–25) -

BUDGET(2023–24)-

BUDGET(2022–23)-

== Revenue ==
The following are the income sources for the corporation from the Central and State Government

=== Revenue from taxes ===
Following is the Tax related revenue for the corporation:

- Property tax
- Profession tax
- Entertainment tax
- Grants from Central and State Government like Goods and Services Tax
- Advertisement tax

=== Revenue from non-tax sources ===
Following is the Non Tax related revenue for the corporation:

- Water usage charges
- Fees from Documentation services
- Rent received from municipal property
- Funds from municipal bonds

== Wards ==
Wards of Muzaffarpur Municipal Corporation with Population and Notable Localities
Ward Number	Population (2011)	Notable Localities/Areas
1	6,725	Brahmpura, Daudpur, Kolhuapaigamberpur, Awas Nagar, Saraswati Nagar, Chanakyapuri
2	9,067	Brhampura, Rahul Nagar, Krishna Toli, Chandni Chowk, Sanjay Cinema Road North
3	6,025	Brahmpura, Rang Toli, Baleshwar Nagar Lane, Soda Godam Road
4	6,547	Juran Chapra, Maharaji-1,2,3,4,5 Nunfar Brahmpura
5	5,252	Brahampura, Dewarya Road, Emli Chatti, Mahesh Babu Chowk
6	7,942	Brahampura, Damodarpur, Iqwal Hashan Road, Bibiganj, Mehdihasan Road South
7	7,238	Bibiganj, Chitrakut Nagar, Bhagwanpur, Pathakpuri, Govindpuri
8	7,681	Maripur, Chapra Lodi, Ram Raji Road
9	5,873	Chapra Lodi, Azad Colony, Jaitpur Colony, Chakkar Road, Prisadan Gali
10	6,369	Maripur, Tilak Nagar, Rasulpur jilani, Jaiprabha Nagar, Chak Abdul Wahid
11	6,768	Saria Ganj, Sarai Sayed Ali, Islampur
12	9,763	Daudpur Kothi, Harpur Lahori, Sikandarpur, Kundal, Brahmpura Kundal
13	6,768	Sikandarpur, Akhara Ghat Road, New Aria Sikandarpur, Annapurana Nagar
14	6,403	Sikandarpur, New Aria, Kali Mandir Road, Akhara ghat Road,
15	9,215	[Localities not specified]
16	8,554	[Localities not specified]
17	7,703	[Localities not specified]
18	6,951	[Localities not specified]
19	7,154	[Localities not specified]
20	5,944	[Localities not specified]
21	5,482	[Localities not specified]
22	6,094	[Localities not specified]
23	6,166	[Localities not specified]
24	6,946	[Localities not specified]
25	6,226	[Localities not specified]
26	5,906	[Localities not specified]
27	7,119	[Localities not specified]
28	5,273	[Localities not specified]
29	6,468	[Localities not specified]
30	8,021	[Localities not specified]
31	7,448	Kumhar Tola
32	8,152	[Localities not specified]
33	7,295	[Localities not specified]
34	9,063	[Localities not specified]
35	6,839	[Localities not specified]
36	7,052	[Localities not specified]
37	5,513	[Localities not specified]
38	6,578	[Localities not specified]
39	7,149	[Localities not specified]
40	7,992	[Localities not specified]
41	7,291	[Localities not specified]
42	7,262	[Localities not specified]
43	6,211	[Localities not specified]
44	7,010	[Localities not specified]
45	8,594	[Localities not specified]
46	9,081	[Localities not specified]
47	9,242	[Localities not specified]
48	8,892	[Localities not specified]
49	10,155	[Localities not specified]

== Functions ==
Muzaffarpur Municipal Corporation is created for the following functions:

- Planning for the town including its surroundings which are covered under its Department's Urban Planning Authority .
- Approving construction of new buildings and authorising use of land for various purposes.
- Improvement of the town's economic and Social status.
- Arrangements of water supply towards commercial, residential and industrial purposes.
- Planning for fire contingencies through Fire Service Departments.
- Creation of solid waste management, public health system and sanitary services.
- Working for the development of ecological aspect like development of Urban Forestry and making guidelines for environmental protection.
- Working for the development of weaker sections of the society like mentally and physically handicapped, old age and gender biased people.
- Making efforts for improvement of slums and poverty removal in the town.

== Gallerry ==
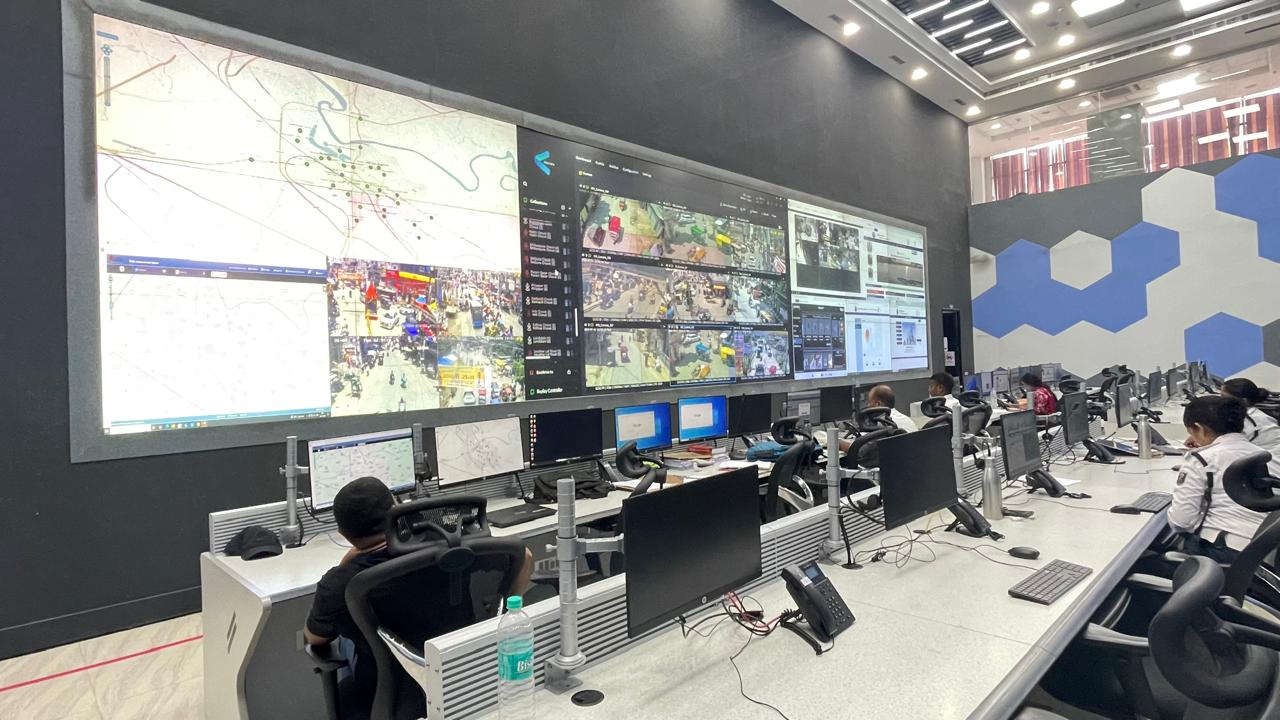
ICCC Muzaffarpur

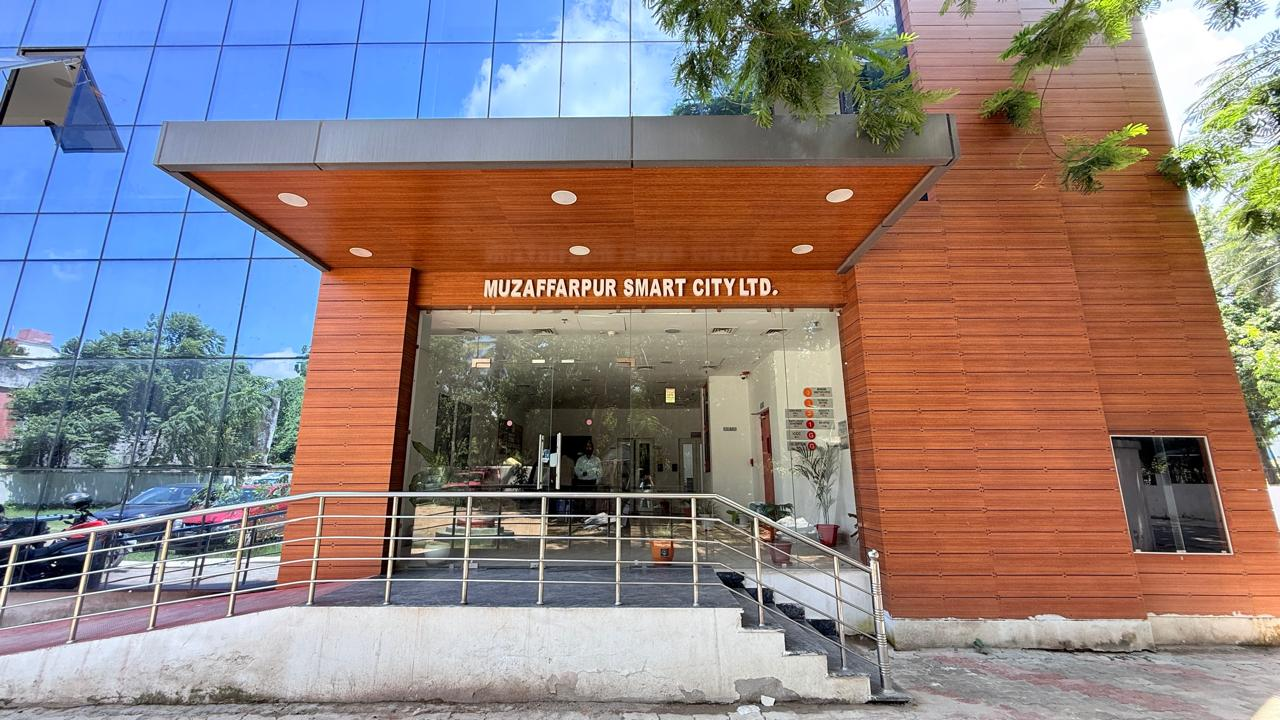
MSCL Office

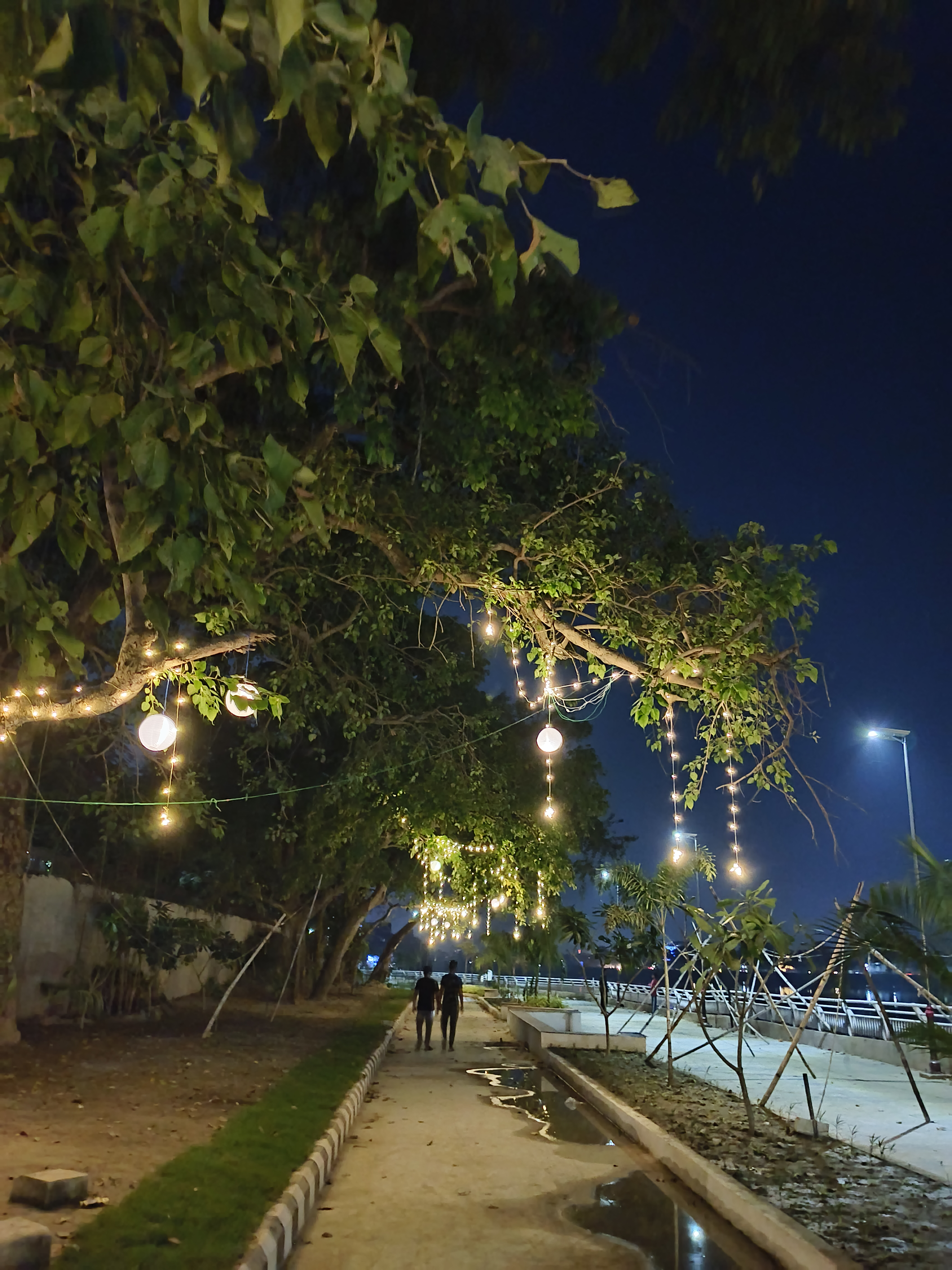
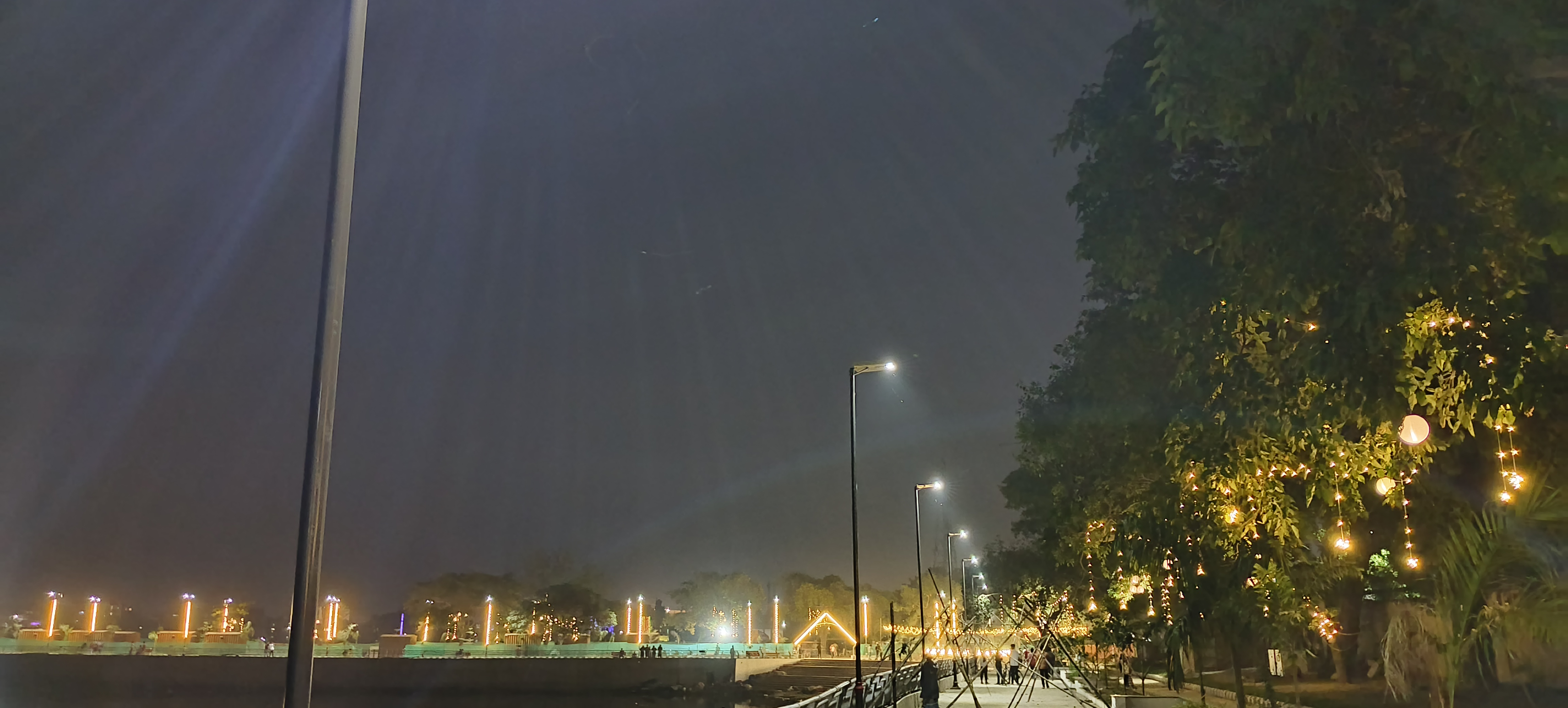

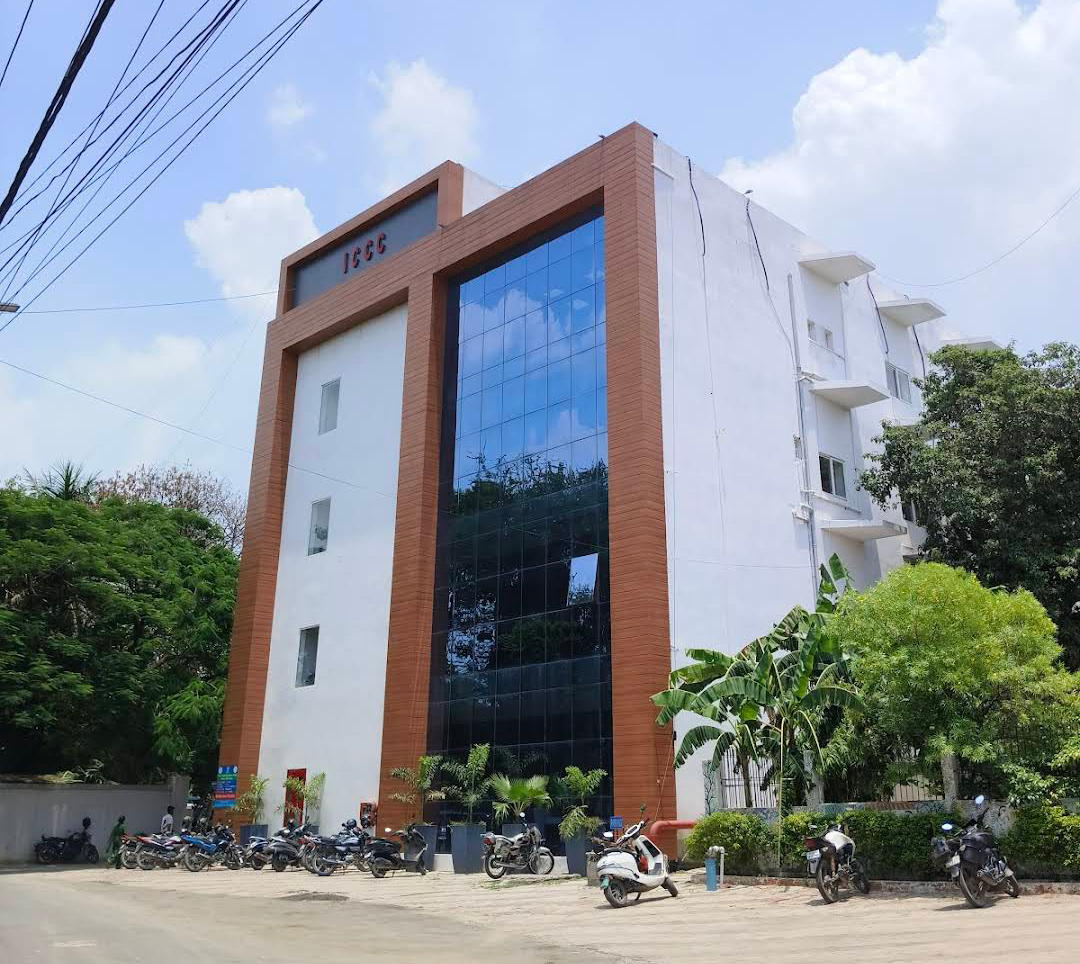
ICCC Main Building
