= Sakra Assembly constituency =

Coordinates: 25°55′N 85°32′E

Sakra
- Constituency No. 92 for the Bihar Legislative Assembly

Constituency details
- Country: India
- Region: East India
- State: Bihar
- District: Muzaffarpur
- Established: 1957
- Total electors: 273,397

Member of Legislative Assembly
- 18th Bihar Legislative Assembly
- Incumbent Aditya Kumar
- Party: JD(U)
- Alliance: NDA
- Elected year: 2025

Sakra Assembly constituency is an assembly constituency in Muzaffarpur district in the Indian state of Bihar. It is reserved for scheduled castes.

== Overview ==
As per Delimitation of Parliamentary and Assembly constituencies Order, 2008, No. 92 Sakra Assembly constituency (SC) is composed of the following: Sakra and Dholi Muraul community development blocks.

Sakra Assembly constituency is part of No. 15 Muzaffarpur (Lok Sabha constituency).

== Members of the Legislative Assembly ==
Year	Name	Party
1957	Kapildeo Narain Singh	Indian National Congress
1957	Ramgulam Chaudhary	Indian National Congress
1962	Mahesh Prasad Singh	Indian National Congress
1967	Newa Lal Mahto	Samyukta Socialist Party
1969	Newa Lal Mahto	Samyukta Socialist Party
1972	Hiralal Paswan	Samyukta Socialist Party
1977	Shivnandan Paswan	Janata Party
1980	Fakirchand Ram	Indian National Congress
1985	Shivnandan Paswan	Lokdal
1990	Kamal Paswan	Janata Dal
1995	Kamal Paswan	Janata Dal
2000	Sital Ram	Rashtriya Janata Dal
2005	Bilat Paswan	Janata Dal (United)
2005	Bilat Paswan	Janata Dal (United)
2010	Suresh Chanchal	Janata Dal (United)
2015	Lal Babu Ram	Rashtriya Janata Dal
2020	Ashok Kumar Choudhary	Janata Dal (United)
2025	Aditya Kumar	Janata Dal (United)

== Election results ==
=== 2025 ===
2025 Bihar Legislative Assembly election: Sakra
Party	Candidate	Votes	%	±%
JD(U)	Aditya Kumar	98,723	47.9	+7.65
INC	Umesh Kumar Ram	83,673	40.6	+1.27
JSP	Renu Kumari Alias Renu Paswan	6,414	3.11	
Independent	Sateesh Kumar	3,594	1.74	
Independent	Sachindra Kumar	3,441	1.67	
SUCI(C)	Ram Sewak Paswan	3,059	1.48	
BSP	Ashok Kumar	2,564	1.24	+0.09
NOTA	None of the above	3,535	1.72	−0.91
Majority		15,050	7.3	+6.38
Turnout		206,108	75.39	+12.31
JD(U) gain from INC		Swing		

=== 2020 ===
2020 Bihar Legislative Assembly election: Sakra
Party	Candidate	Votes	%	±%
JD(U)	Ashok Kumar Choudhary	67,265	40.25	
INC	Umesh Kumar Ram	65,728	39.33	
LJP	Sanjay Paswan	13,528	8.09	
Independent	Suresh Mhato	3,288	1.97	
Independent	Shiv Lal Paswan	2,690	1.61	
Bhartiya Party (Loktantrik)	Raj Kumar Choudhary	2,277	1.36	
JAP(L)	Suresh Kumar	1,936	1.16	
BSP	Geeta Kumari	1,920	1.15	+0.85
NCP	Dr. Abhay Kumar	1,835	1.1	
NOTA	None of the above	4,392	2.63	−0.44
Majority		1,537	0.92	−7.39
Turnout		167,122	63.08	−1.64
JD(U) gain from RJD		Swing		

=== 2015 ===
2015 Bihar Legislative Assembly election: Sakra
Party	Candidate	Votes	%	±%
RJD	Lal Babu Ram	75,010	47.92	
BJP	Arjun Ram	61,998	39.61	
Independent	Sachchidanand Suman	5,169	3.3	
CPI	Barun Kumar	1,766	1.13	
Independent	Umesh Kumar Ram	1,678	1.07	
NOTA	None of the above	4,804	3.07	
Majority		13,012	8.31	
Turnout		156,519	64.72	
