= Mathurapur Buzurg =

Village in Muzaffarpur, Bihar, India

- Village
- Location in Bihar, India Mathurapur Buzurg (India)
- Coordinates: 26.2736380°N 85.5883154°E
- Country: India
- State: Bihar
- District: Muzaffarpur
- Block: Aurai

Government
  - Type: Gram Panchayat
  - Body: Mathurapur Buzurg Gram Panchayat

Area
  - Total: 219 ha (540 acres)

Population (2011)
  - Total: 1,958
  - Density: 894/km^{2} (2,320/sq mi)

Languages
  - Official: Hindi, Urdu
- Time zone: UTC+5:30 (IST)
- PIN: 843321
- Vehicle registration: BR-06

Mathurapur Buzurg is a village located in the Aurai block, Muzaffarpur district, in the Indian state of Bihar. It comes under Mathurapur Buzurg Gram Panchayat and is part of the Tirhut division.

== Geography ==
Mathurapur Buzurg has a total geographical area of 219 hectares (2.19 km²). It is situated in Aurai block of Muzaffarpur district and lies approximately 52–60 km away from Muzaffarpur town, which is the nearest major urban and economic centre.

== Demographics ==
According to the 2011 Census of India, Mathurapur Buzurg had a population of 1,958 persons living in 445 households. Of this, 1,046 were males and 912 were females. The population of children aged 0–6 years was 330 (175 boys and 155 girls), which represents 16.85% of the total population.

The average sex ratio was 872 females per 1000 males, and the child sex ratio stood at 886 girls per 1000 boys. Both figures are lower than the Bihar state averages of 918 and 935 respectively.

=== Literacy ===
The overall literacy rate of the village was 53.32%.

- Male literacy: 60.51%
- Female literacy: 45.05%

=== Caste composition ===
Scheduled Castes constituted 28.91% of the population (566 persons), while Scheduled Tribes accounted for just one individual.

=== Work profile ===
Out of the total population, 688 persons were engaged in work activities.

- 490 were main workers (employment more than 6 months).
- 198 were marginal workers (employment less than 6 months).

Among main workers:

- 120 were cultivators (owner or co-owner)
- 346 were agricultural labourers

== Infrastructure ==
- Education – The village has at least one primary school. Secondary and higher education facilities are available in Aurai and Muzaffarpur.
- Healthcare – The nearest Primary Health Centre (PHC) is located in Aurai.
- Water supply – Drinking water is provided mainly through hand pumps and tube wells.
- Electricity – Electricity is available for domestic and agricultural purposes, although supply may not be continuous.
- Postal services – The village falls under the postal PIN code 843321, served by the Basua Branch Office.

== Transport ==
Mathurapur Buzurg is connected by rural roads to nearby villages and to Aurai block headquarters. Muzaffarpur Junction is the nearest major railhead. Bus and shared auto services connect the village to Muzaffarpur and surrounding areas.

== Administration ==
The village is governed by a Gram Panchayat under the Panchayati Raj system. Administratively, it comes under Aurai block and Muzaffarpur subdivision.

== See also ==
- Villages in Bihar
