= Ashok Kumar Choudhary =

Indian politician

Member of the Bihar Legislative Assembly
- In office 2015–2020
- Constituency: Kanti Assembly constituency
- In office 2020–2025
- Constituency: Sakra Assembly constituency

Personal details
- Born: 1973 (age 52–53) Kanti, Muzaffarpur district, Bihar, India
- Party: Independent; Janata Dal (United)
- Parent: Ram Lakhan Chaudhary (father)
- Occupation: Politician

Ashok Kumar Choudhary (born 1973) is an Indian politician from Bihar. He is an MLA from Sakra Assembly constituency which is reserved for Scheduled Caste community in Muzaffarpur district. He won the 2020 Bihar Legislative Assembly election representing the Janata Dal (United) Party.

== Early life and education ==
Choudhary is from Kanti, Muzaffarpur district, Bihar. He is the son of late Ram Lakhan Chaudhary. He completed his Intermediate in 1985 at Ram Manohar Lohia Mahavidyalaya, Muzaffarpur, Bihar.

== Career ==
Choudhary won as an MLA for the first time from Kanti Assembly constituency as an independent candidate in the 2015 Bihar Legislative Assembly election. He won for a second time in the 2020 Bihar Legislative Assembly election from Sakra Assembly constituency representing the Janata Dal (United) Party. He polled 67,265 votes and defeated his nearest rival, Umesh Kumar Ram of Indian National Congress, by a margin of 1,537 votes.
