= Kanti Assembly constituency =

Coordinates: 26°12′32″N 85°18′44″E

Kanti
- Constituency No. - for the Bihar Legislative Assembly

Constituency details
- Country: India
- Region: East India
- State: Bihar
- District: Muzaffarpur
- Established: 1951
- Total electors: 319,372

Member of Legislative Assembly
- 18th Bihar Legislative Assembly
- Incumbent Ajit Kumar
- Party: JD(U)
- Alliance: NDA
- Elected year: 2025

Kanti is an assembly constituency in Muzaffarpur district in the Indian state of Bihar. The current sitting MLA (member of legislative assembly) is Er Ajit Kumar of JDU

== Members of the Legislative Assembly ==
Year	Name	Party
1952	Jamuna Prasad Tripathi	Indian National Congress
1957	Jamuna Prasad Tripathi	Indian National Congress
1962	Jamuna Prasad Tripathi	Indian National Congress
1967	M. P. Sinha	Indian National Congress
1969	Harihar Prasad Shahi	Lok Tantrik Congress
1972	Shambhu Sharan Thakur	Indian National Congress
1977	Thakur Prasad Singh	Janata Party
1980	Nalini Ranjan Singh	Socialist Unity Centre of India
1985	Nalini Ranjan Singh	Socialist Unity Centre of India
1990	Nalini Ranjan Singh	Janata Dal
1995	Mufti Mohammad Quasim	Janata Dal
2000	Gulam Jilani Warsi	Rashtriya Janata Dal
2005	Er. Ajit Kumar	Lok Janshakti Party
2005	Er. Ajit Kumar	Janata Dal (United)
2010	Er. Ajit Kumar	Janata Dal (United)
2015	Ashok Kumar Choudhary	Independent politician
2020	Mohammad Israil Mansuri	Rashtriya Janata Dal
2025	Er. Ajit Kumar	Janata Dal

== Overview ==
As per Delimitation of Parliamentary and Assembly constituencies Order, 2008, No. 95 Kanti Assembly constituency is composed of the following: Kanti and Marwan community development blocks.

Kanti Assembly constituency is part of No. 16 Vaishali (Lok Sabha constituency).

== Election results ==
=== 2025 ===
2025 Bihar Legislative Assembly election: Kanti
Party	Candidate	Votes	%	±%
JD(U)	Ajit Kumar	117,299	50.43	+37.22
RJD	Mohammad Israil Mansuri	91,504	39.34	+6.45
JSP	Sudarshan Mishra	4,251	1.83	
Independent	Suresh Kumar Gupta	2,889	1.24	
ASP(KR)	Kumari Sheetal	2,594	1.12	
NOTA	None of the above	7,823	3.36	+2.59
Majority		25,795	11.09	+5.83
Turnout		232,600	72.83	+9.55
JD(U) gain from RJD		Swing		

=== 2020 ===
2020 Bihar Legislative Assembly election: Kanti
Party	Candidate	Votes	%	±%
RJD	Mohammad Israil Mansuri	64,458	32.89	+6.67
Independent	Ajit Kumar	54,144	27.63	+26.63
JD(U)	Mohammad Jamal	25,891	13.21	
LJP	Bijay Prasad Singh	18,093	9.23	
Independent	Neera Devi	9,885	5.04	
Janshakti Vikas Party (Democratic)	Sunil Kumar	2,744	1.4	
Jai Maha Bharath Party	Krishna Devi	2,188	1.12	
SUCI(C)	Lal Babu Roy	2,057	1.05	+0.02
Rashtriya Jan Jan Party	Anay Kumar	1,975	1.01	
NOTA	None of the above	1,507	0.77	−0.04
Majority		10,314	5.26	+0.09
Turnout		195,962	63.28	−1.93
RJD gain from Independent		Swing		

=== 2015 ===
In the 2015 Bihar Legislative Assembly election Ashok Kumar Choudhary won the seat by almost 10000 votes against Ajit Kumar.

2015 Bihar Legislative Assembly election: Kanti
Party	Candidate	Votes	%	±%
Independent	Ashok Kumar Choudhary (Sadatpur)	58,111	32.38	
HAM(S)	Ajit Kumar	48,836	27.21	
RJD	Md. Parwez Alam	47,050	26.22	
Independent	Umesh Paswan	3,109	1.73	
Independent	Ashok Kumar Chodhary (Dhamauli Ramnath)	2,144	1.19	
BSP	Md. Inamul Haque	2,031	1.13	
Independent	Amar Deo Singh	1,948	1.09	
SUCI(C)	Lal Babu Roy	1,850	1.03	
Independent	Arjun Prasad Gupta	1,832	1.02	
Independent	Ajit Kumar	1,797	1.0	
NOTA	None of the above	1,460	0.81	
Majority		9,275	5.17	
Turnout		179,468	65.21	

=== 2010 ===
In the 2010 state assembly elections, Ajit Kumar of JD(U) won the Kanti assembly seat, defeating his nearest rival Md. Israil of RJD. Contests in most years were multi cornered but only winners and runners up are being mentioned. Ajit Kumar of JD(U) defeated Muhmad Haidar Azad of RJD in October 2005. Ajit Kumar representing LJP defeated Md. Jamal of RJD in February 2005. Gulam Jilani Warsi of RJD defeated Ajit Kumar of AJBP in 2000. Mufti Mohammad Quasim of Janata Dal defeated Ajit Kumar of Congress in 1995. Nalini Ranjan Singh of JD defeated Shambhu Sharan Thakur of Congress in 1990. Nalini Ranjan Singh representing SUC defeated Tarakeshari Sinha of LD in 1985 and Shambhu Sharan Thakur of Congress in 1980. Thakur Prasad Singh of JP defeated Nalini Ranjan Singh of SUC in 1977.

=== 1972 ===
In the 1951 state assembly elections, Jamuna Prasad Tripathy (Yamuna Prasad Tripathy) of INC defeated Nagendra Prasad Singh (IND) by 3049 votes. In 1957 state assembly elections, Jamuna Prasad Tripathy (Yamuna Prasad Tripathy) of INC again won the Kanti assembly seat, defeating his nearest rival Yogendra Prasad Sharma by a close margin of 445 votes. In 1962 Jamuna Prasad Tripathy (Yamuna Prasad Tripathy) defeated Harihar Prasad Shahi by a margin of 2714 votes. M.P. Sinha was the congress candidate in 1967 election which he won by a huge margin of 31034 votes. In 1969 state assembly elections Harihar Prasad Shahi of LTC defeated 3 times INC MLA Jamuna Prasad Tripathy (Yamuna Prasad Tripathy). Shambhu Sharan Thakur of INC won the 1972 election by 1462 votes.
