= Shahi lychee =

Variety of lychee fruit

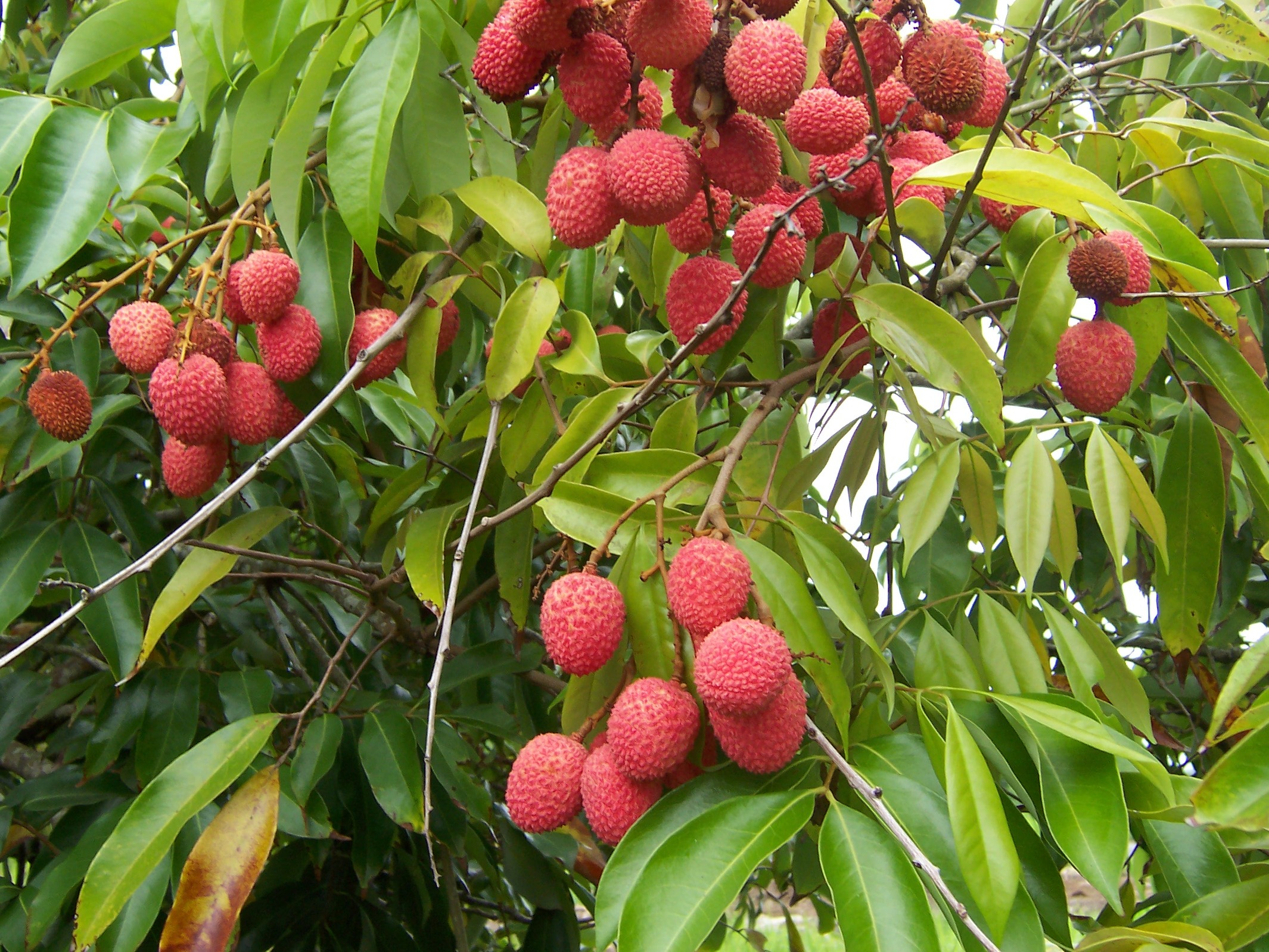
Litchi fruits

The Shahi Litchi is a variety of litchi grown in the Muzaffarpur district and some neighbouring districts in the Indian state of Bihar

Bihar is one of the largest litchi-producing states in India, contributing over 40% of the country's total litchi production. The region around Muzaffarpur is particularly famous for its extensive litchi orchards and gardens. Two main varieties of litchi are cultivated in this area — the ‘China’ litchi and the ‘Shahi’ litchi — along with other local varieties such as ‘Longia’ and ‘Calcutta’.

The Shahi litchi variety is known for its large fruits, juicy pulp, and a pleasant sugar–acid balance. It is also distinguished by its aromatic pulp with a characteristic rose-like fragrance. The favourable climatic conditions and fertile alluvial soil rich in calcium found in Muzaffarpur, Vaishali, Samastipur, East Champaran, and Begusarai districts contribute to the exceptional quality of the litchis grown in this region.

The Shahi Litchi of Bihar was granted a Geographical Indication (GI) tag in 2018.

== Shelf life ==
The Shahi Litchi has a short shelf life of about 1–2 days at room temperature, which can be extended to 10–15 days under refrigeration (4–5°C) and up to 25–30 days in controlled atmosphere storage. Its limited shelf life is mainly due to the thin pericarp that causes rapid moisture loss and browning.

== Recognition ==
The Shahi Litchi of Muzaffarpur, Bihar received the Geographical Indication (GI) tag in 2018 under the Agricultural (Fruit) category. The Litchi Growers Association of Bihar (LGAB) is the registered proprietor of the GI, granted by the Geographical Indications Registry, Government of India, under Application No. 112.

After receiving GI recognition, Shahi Litchi has been exported to international markets, including countries such as the United Kingdom, via air routes. This has enhanced its export potential and contributed to brand value and economic development in the region. It remains one of the most prominent horticultural products of Bihar, often referred to as the “King of Fruits” of North Bihar.
