= Baruraj Assembly constituency =

Coordinates: 26°15′09″N 85°08′20″E

Baruraj
- Constituency No. - for the Bihar Legislative Assembly

Constituency details
- Country: India
- Region: East India
- State: Bihar
- Established: 1951
- Total electors: 278,389

Member of Legislative Assembly
- 18th Bihar Legislative Assembly
- Incumbent Arun Kumar Singh
- Party: BJP
- Alliance: NDA
- Elected year: 2025

Baruraj is an assembly constituency in Muzaffarpur district in the Indian state of Bihar. It is part of the North Bihar region.

== Overview ==
As per Delimitation of Parliamentary and Assembly constituencies Order, 2008, No. 96 Baruraj Assembly constituency is composed of the following: Motipur community development block; Chochahin Chhapra and Saraiya gram panchayats of Paroo CD Block.

Baruraj Assembly constituency is part of No. 16 Vaishali (Lok Sabha constituency).

== Members of the Legislative Assembly ==
Year	Name	Party
1952	Ramchandra Prasad Shahi	Indian National Congress
1957	Ramchandra Prasad Shahi	Indian National Congress
1962	Ramchandra Prasad Shahi	Indian National Congress
1967	Sukhdeo Giri	Independent politician
1969	Ramchandra Prasad Shahi	Indian National Congress
1972	Jamuna Singh	Samyukta Socialist Party
1977	Balendra Prasad Singh	Communist Party of India
1980	Jamuna Singh	Indian National Congress
1985	Shashi Kumar Rai	Lokdal
1990	Shashi Kumar Rai	Janata Dal
1995	Shashi Kumar Rai	Janata Dal
2000	Shashi Kumar Rai	Janata Dal (United)
2005	Brij Kishore Singh	Rashtriya Janata Dal
2005	Shashi Kumar Rai	Janata Dal (United)
2010	Brij Kishore Singh	Rashtriya Janata Dal
2015	Nand Kumar Rai	Rashtriya Janata Dal
2020	Arun Kumar Singh	Bharatiya Janata Party
2025	Arun Kumar Singh	Bharatiya Janata Party

== Election results ==
=== 2025 ===
2025 Bihar Legislative Assembly election: Baruraj
Party	Candidate	Votes	%	±%
BJP	Arun Kumar Singh	96,879	47.14	▼2.33
VIP	Rakesh Kumar	67,827	33.0	
JSP	Hiralal Khariya	19,935	9.7	
Independent	Awadhesh Kumar Gupta	4,857	2.36	
BSP	Nasima Khatoon	2,944	1.43	▼11.39
Lok Chetna Dal	Vidhalal Sahni	2,035	0.99	
NOTA	None of the above	4,926	2.4	▼0.52
Majority		29,052	14.14	▼10.57
Turnout		205,509	73.82	▲12.7
BJP hold		Swing	NDA	

=== 2020 ===
2020 Bihar Legislative Assembly election: Baruraj
Party	Candidate	Votes	%	±%
BJP	Arun Kumar Singh	87,407	49.47	+9.0
RJD	Nand Kumar Rai	43,753	24.76	−18.86
BSP	Hiralal Khadia	22,650	12.82	+9.19
Independent	Rakesh Kumar	7,304	4.13	
Independent	Sanjay Kumar Paswan	3,877	2.19	+0.84
NOTA	None of the above	5,160	2.92	−1.06
Majority		43,654	24.71	+21.56
Turnout		176,676	61.12	+0.79
BJP gain from RJD		Swing		

=== 2015 ===
2015 Bihar Legislative Assembly election: Baruraj
Party	Candidate	Votes	%	±%
RJD	Nand Kumar Rai	68,011	43.62	
BJP	Arun Kumar Singh	63,102	40.47	
BSP	Najmul Hoda	5,658	3.63	
Independent	Vidhalal Sahni	2,967	1.9	
CPI	Raghuwar Bhagat	2,319	1.49	
Sarvajan Kalyan Loktantrik Party	Hiralal Khadia	2,161	1.39	
Independent	Sanjay Kumar Paswan	2,099	1.35	
NOTA	None of the above	6,208	3.98	
Majority		4,909	3.15	
Turnout		155,924	60.33	

=== 2010 ===
In the 2010 state assembly elections, Brij Kishor Singh of RJD won the Baruraj assembly seat defeating his nearest rival Nand Kumar Rai of JD(U). Contests in most years were multi cornered but only winners and runners up are being mentioned. Shashi Kumar Rai of JD(U) defeated Brij Kishor Singh of RJD in October 2005. Brij Kishor Singh of RJD defeated Shashi Kumar Rai of JD(U) in February 2005. Shashi Kumar Rai of JD(U) defeated Brij Kishor Singh of RJD in 2000. Shashi Kumar Rai of JD defeated Brij Kumar Singh of BPP in 1995 and Balendra Prasad Singh, Independent, in 1990. Shashi Kumar Rai of LD defeated Jamuna Singh of Congress in 1985. Jamuna Singh of Congress defeated Shashi Kumar Rai of Janata Party (Secular – Charan Singh) in 1980. Balendra Prasad Singh of CPI defeated Shashi Kumar Rai, Independent, in 1977.
