= Mohammad Israil Mansuri =

Indian politician

Minister of Information Technology Government of Bihar
- In office 16 August 2022 – 24 January 2024
- Chief Minister: Nitish Kumar
- Deputy Chief Minister: Tejashwi Yadav
- Preceded by: Ashok Kumar Chaudhary
- Succeeded by: Er. Ajeet Kumar

Member Of Bihar Legislative Assembly
- In office 10 November 2020 – 14 November 2025
- Constituency: Kanti-95

Personal details
- Born: Muzaffarpur
- Party: Rashtriya Janata Dal
- Spouse: Nagma Mansuri
- Children: 2
- Parent: Md Usman Mansuri (father)
- Occupation: Politician

Mohammad Israil Mansuri is an Indian Politician from Rashtriya Janata Dal and former Member of the Bihar Legislative Assembly from Kanti.
