= Aurai (community development block) =

Community development block in Muzaffarpur district, Bihar, India

- Community development block
- Location within Bihar Location within India
- Coordinates: 26°19′06″N 85°33′55″E
- Country: India
- State: Bihar
- Region: Mithila
- District: Muzaffarpur district
- Villages: 107

Area
  - Total: 198.86 km^{2} (76.78 sq mi)
- Elevation: 55 m (180 ft)

Population (2011)
  - Total: 290,545
  - Density: 1,461.1/km^{2} (3,784.1/sq mi)
- Time zone: UTC+5:30 (IST)
- PIN: 843312

Aurai is a community development block in Muzaffarpur district of Bihar, India.

The administrative headquarters of the block is located in Aurai village. According to the 2011 Census of India, the total population of Aurai block was 290,545.

== Geography ==
Aurai is located in the northeastern part of Muzaffarpur district, Bihar, India. It has an average elevation of 55 metres above sea level.

== Administrative divisions ==
In 2011, there are a total of 107 villages within Aurai Block. They are listed below:

- Adampur Nisf 1st
- Adampur Nisf 2nd
- Ahimanpur urf Selempur
- Alampur Simri
- Amnaur
- Anandpur Ghani
- Arazi Ghanshyampur
- Arazi Sohila Rampur Patti
- Asmanpur
- Atrah
- Aurai
- Babhangawan
- Bahuara
- Bahuarwa
- Baigna Jagir
- Baigna Nizamat
- Baijnathpur urf Imlia
- Balbhadarpur
- Banauli
- Bara Buzurg
- Bara Khurd
- Baram Jiwar Tara Jiwar
- Basant urf Bishunpur Umapat
- Basua urf Amaith
- Bedauli Asli
- Besi Baijnath
- Bhadai
- Bhado
- Bhalura
- Bharospatti urf Bharathpatti
- Bharthua
- Bishunath urf Bishunpur Gokhul
- Bishunpur Jagdish
- Borwara Garib
- Chainpur
- Chihuta
- Dakrawan urf Dagrawan
- Deokali Buzurg
- Deokali Khurd
- Deora Asli
- Dharampur
- Dharharwa urf Parri Dharharwa
- Dharopatti
- Dhasna
- Dih Jiwar
- Dih Jiwar
- Ekma
- Fatehpur Barauna
- Gangauli
- Gangauli
- Ghanshyampur
- Gopalpur
- Gopalpur Bishunpur
- Gopalpur urf Chandwara
- Gorai urf Askauli
- Halimpur
- Harpur
- Harpur Besi
- Haswara
- Inglish Chak
- Jagatpur
- Janarh Jiwajor Benipur
- Jhiktahi
- Jiusar
- Jogaulia
- Jonkikhurd urf Mathurapur Khurd
- Kalyanpur
- Kalyanpur
- Karhatti
- Khetalpur
- Kiratpur
- Kokilwara
- Kothia
- Madhopur
- Madhuban Besi
- Madhuban Partap
- Maheswara
- Mahisautha
- Mahrauli urf Madhauli
- Maksudpur
- Mathna urf Basua
- Mathurapur Buzurg
- Matihani
- Minapur
- Misraulia
- Narhar
- Naya Goan
- Paryag Chak
- Patori
- Pitaunjhia Jagarnath
- Raj Khand
- Rampur
- Rampur
- Rampur Az Rakbe
- Rasulpur
- Ratanpur
- Ratwara Bindwara Deoria
- Saghari
- Sarhanchia
- Shahila Balli
- Shahpur
- Shankarpur
- Sisauli
- Sohila Baijnath
- Sundarkhauli
- Tojaul
- Tulsi Anantpur

== Demographics ==
Religion in Aurai (2011)
Religion	Percentage
Hinduism	85.29%
Islam	14.20%
Christianity	0.11%
Sikhism	0.01%
Others	0.39%

According to the 2011 Census of India, Aurai block had 62,286 households and a total population of 290,545. Of these, 153,987 were male and 136,558 were female. The overall literacy rate was 42.57%, including 49.64% among males and 34.61% among females.

== See also ==
- Muzaffarpur district
