= Muzaffarpur district =

District in Bihar, India

Muzaffarpur district The Land of Lychee
- District of Bihar
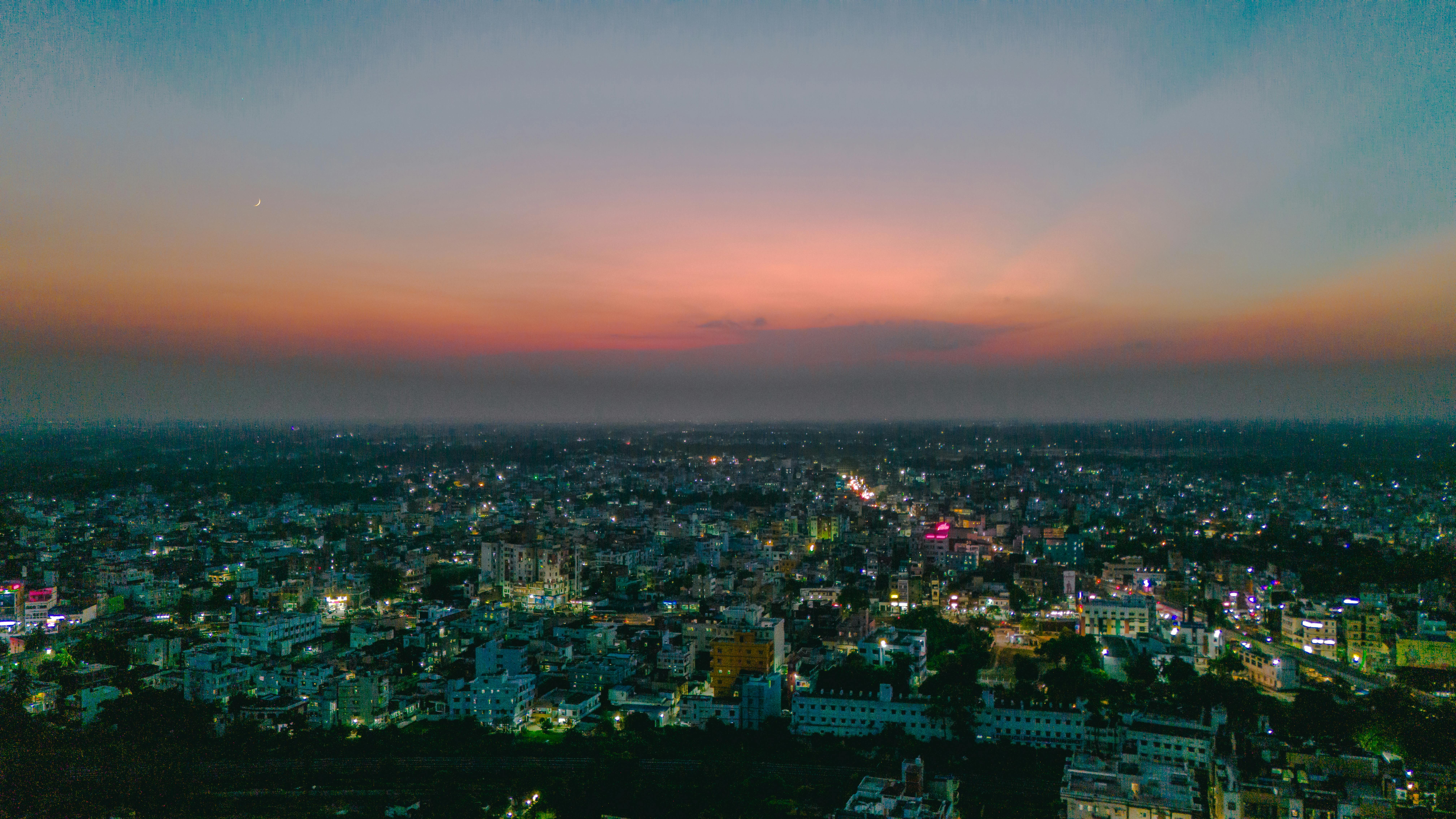
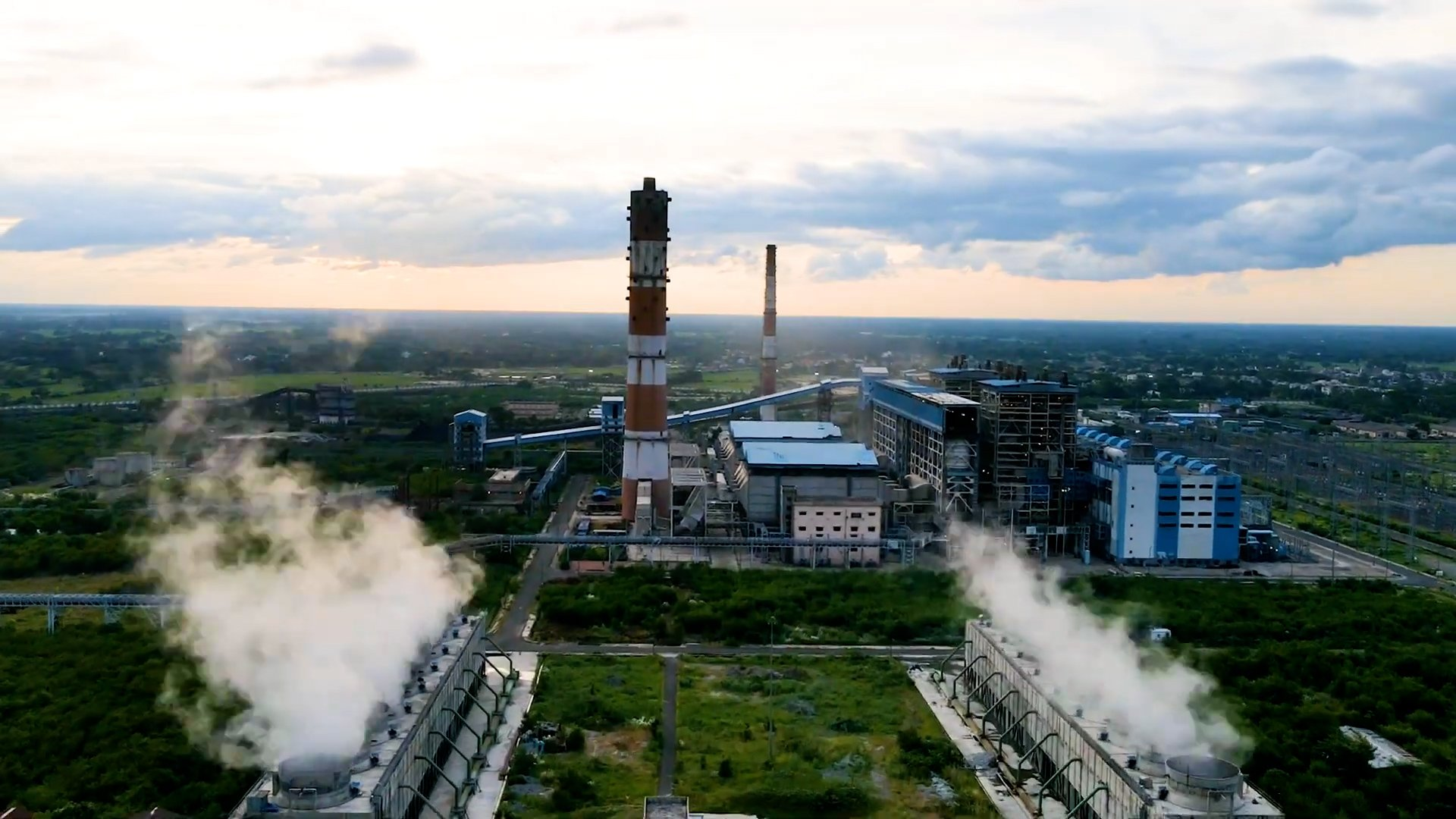
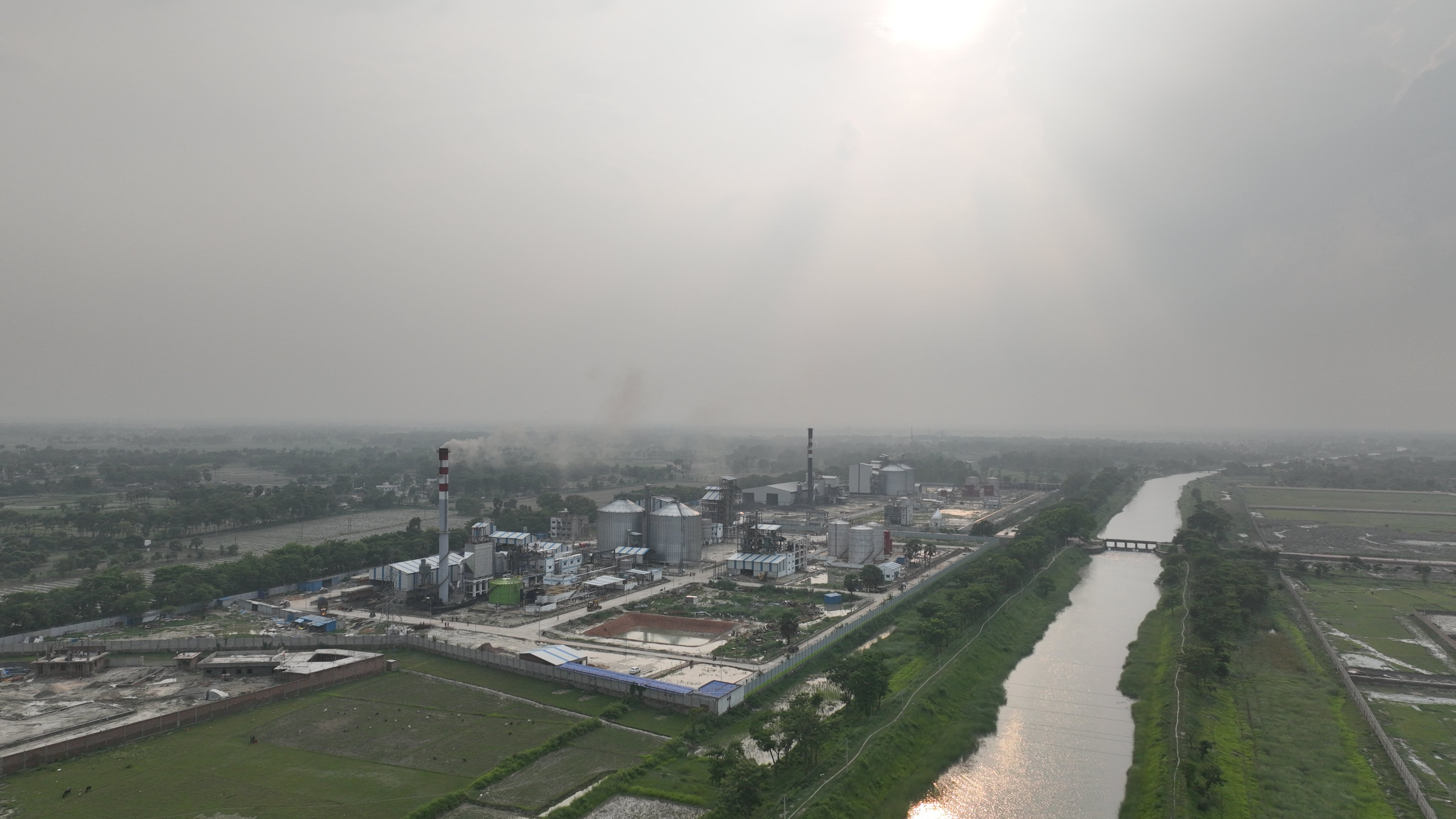
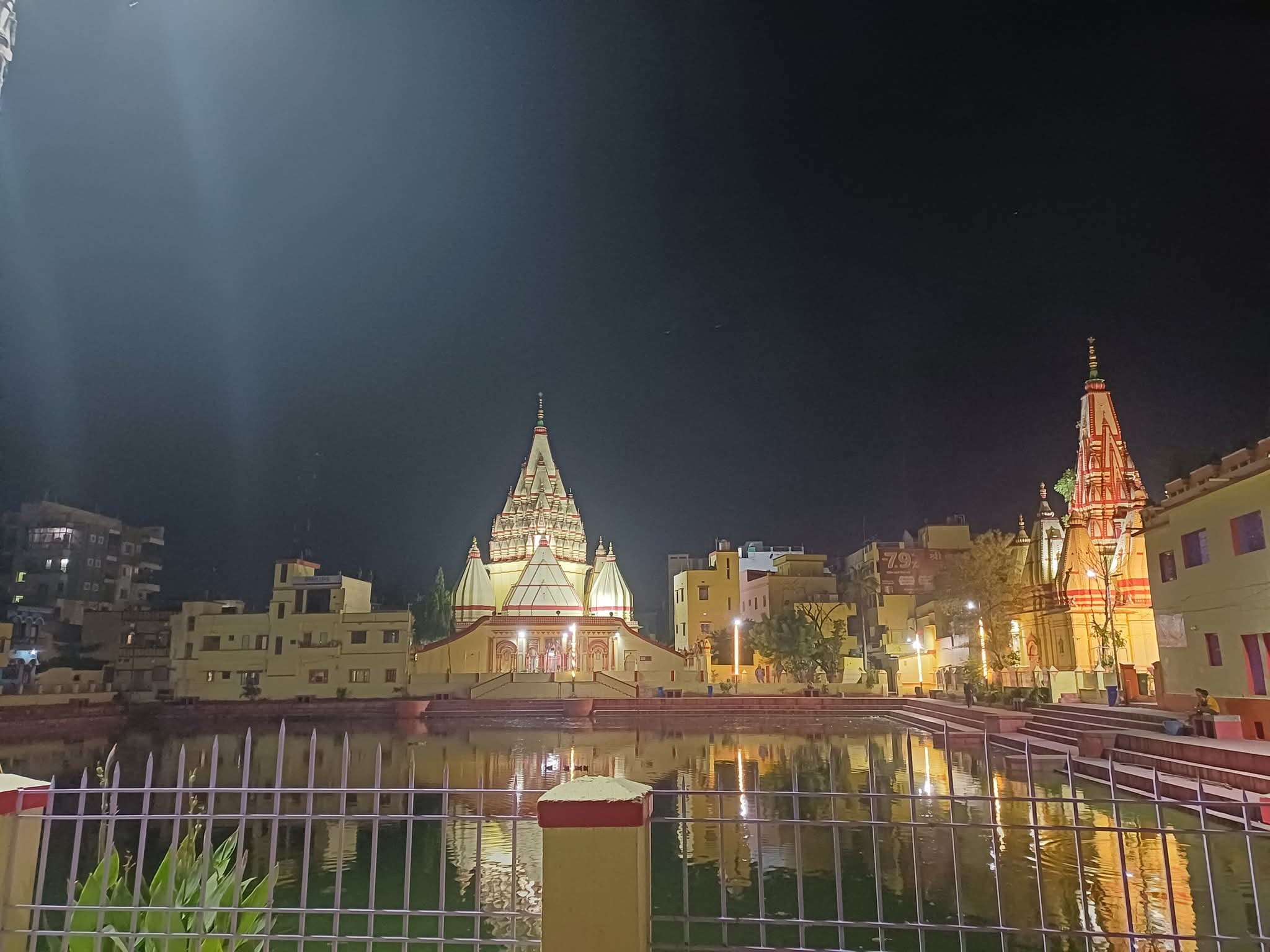
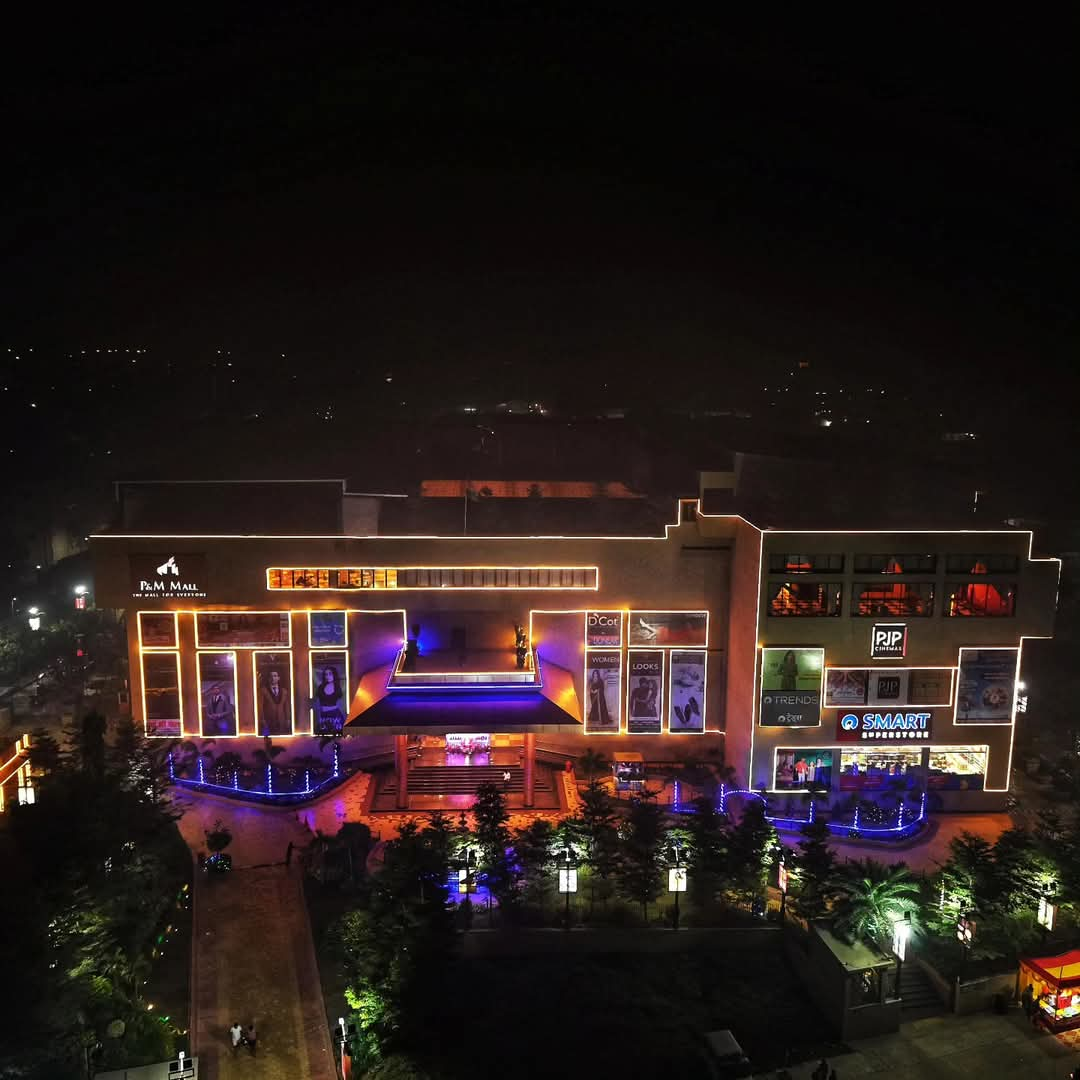
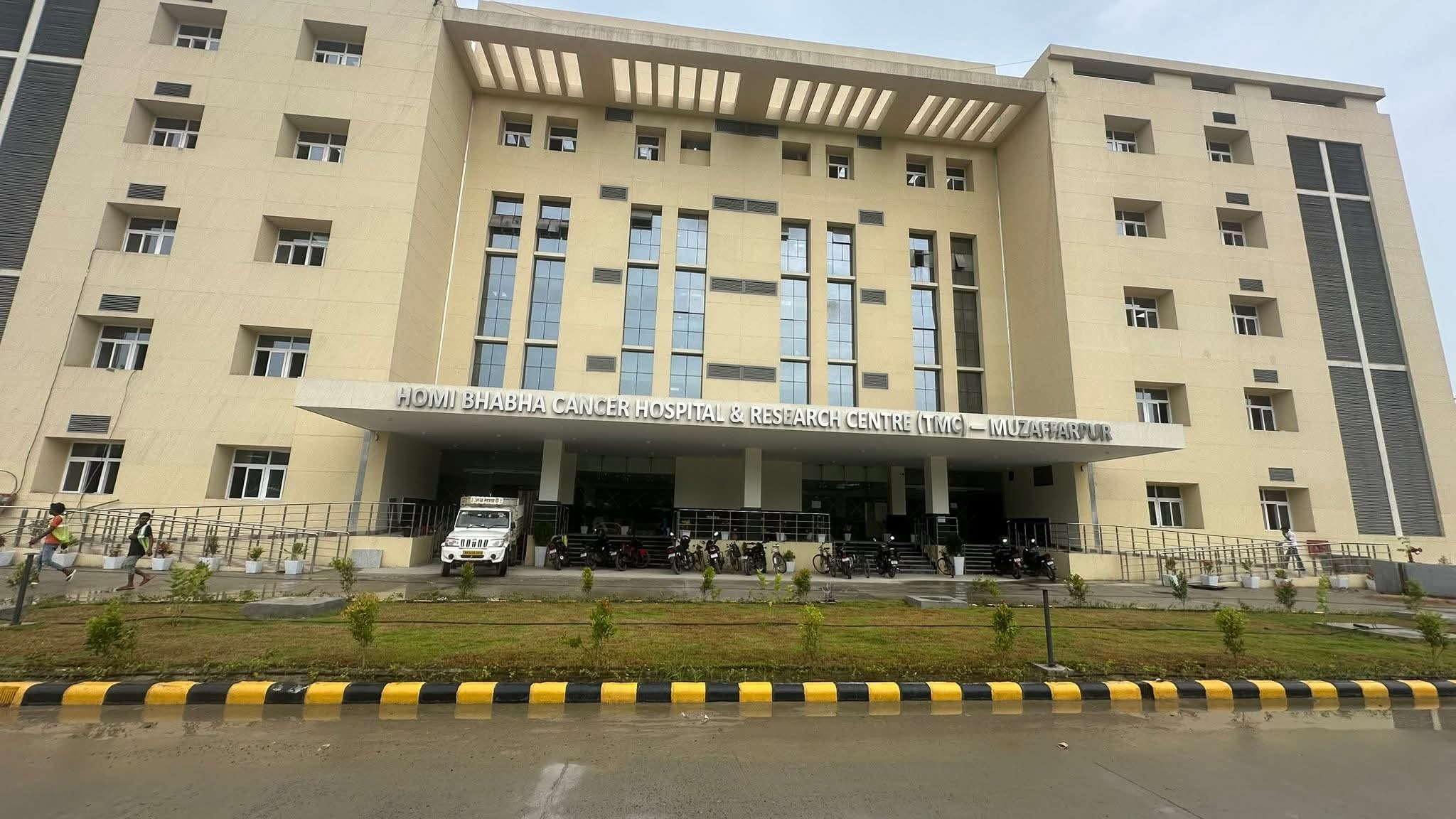
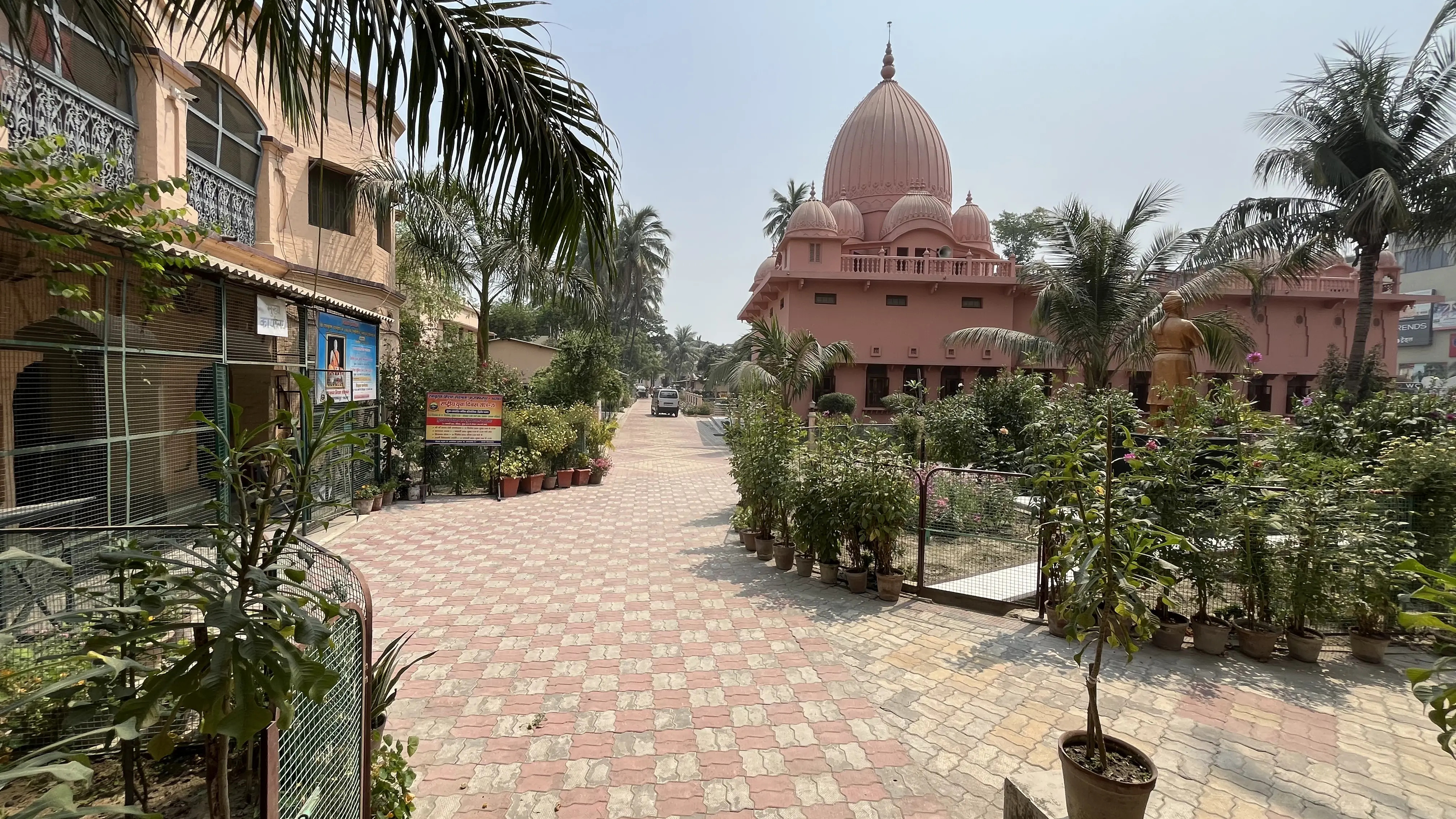
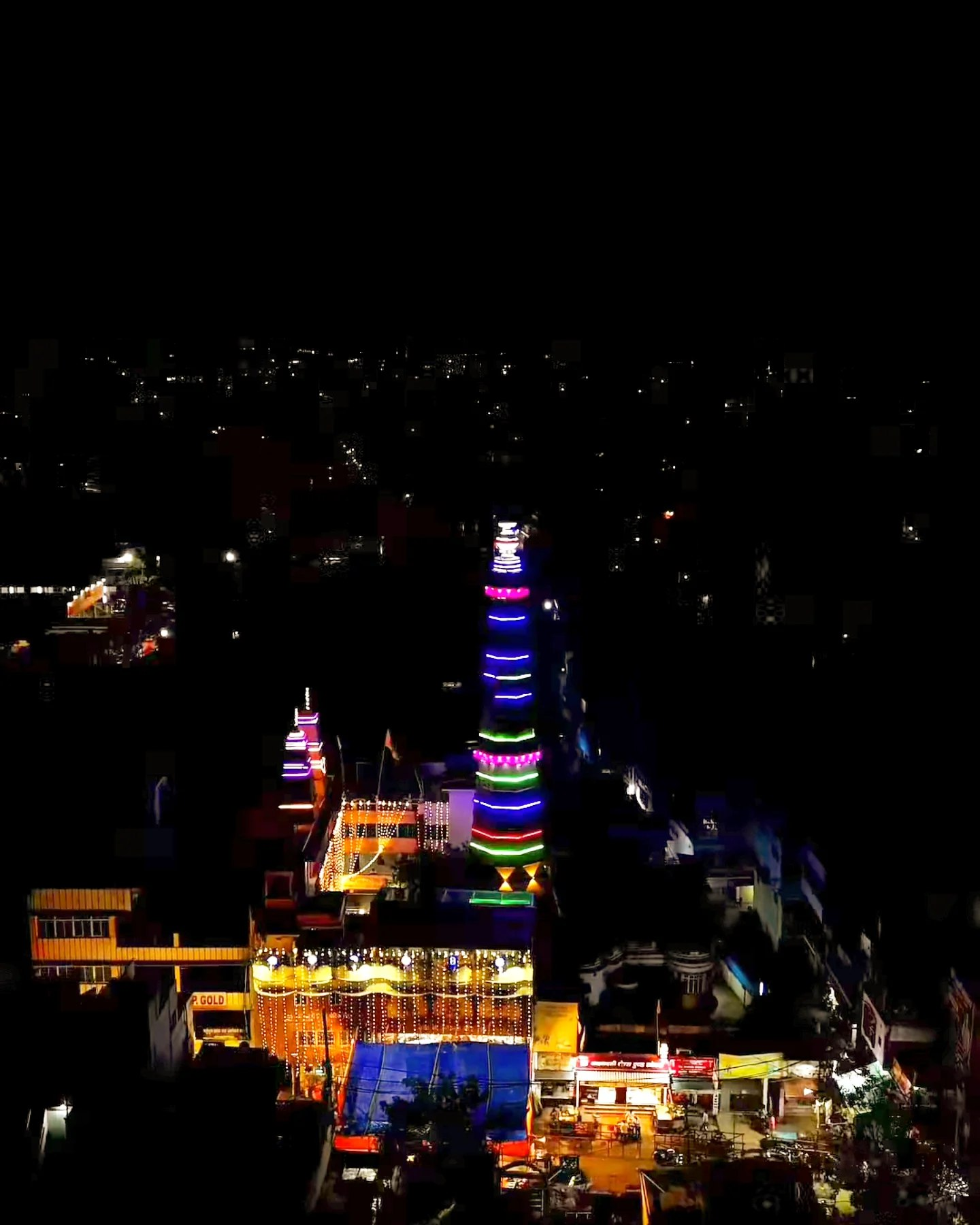
- Muzaffarpur City Aerial View NTPC Kanti Bio Fuel Unit Sahu Pokhar P&M Mall Cancer Hospital RamaKrishna Mission Seva Sharam Garibnath Temple Map oF Muzaffarpur District
- Interactive map of Muzaffarpur district
- Country: India
- State: Bihar
- Division: Tirhut
- Headquarters: Muzaffarpur

Government
  - Lok Sabha constituencies: Muzaffarpur, Vaishali
  - Vidhan Sabha constituencies: Gaighat, Aurai, Minapur, Bochahan, Sakra, Kurhani, Muzaffarpur, Kanti, Baruraj, Paroo, Sahebganj

Area
  - Total: 3,173 km^{2} (1,225 sq mi)

Population (2011)
  - Total: 4,801,062
  - Density: 1,513/km^{2} (3,919/sq mi)

Demographics
  - Literacy: ▲85%
  - Sex ratio: 999
- Time zone: UTC+05:30 (IST)
- Major highways: NH 57, NH 28, NH 22, NH 102, NH 527C
- Website: muzaffarpur.nic.in

Muzaffarpur district is one of the thirty-eight districts of Bihar state, India. Muzaffarpur district is part of and also the headquarters of Tirhut division. Muzaffarpur district is the financial and unofficial capital of North Bihar Tirhut is the ancient name of all of northern Bihar. The district headquarters is Muzaffarpur.

== History ==
Muzaffarpur district, popularly known as the "Land of Litchi," was created in 1875 for administrative convenience by splitting the earlier district of Tirhut district. The district is named after Muzaffar Khan, an Amil (Revenue Officer) under the British administration.

Muzaffarpur has gained international recognition for its delicious litchis, including Shahi litchi and China litchi

=== Ancient ===
The history of Muzaffarpur can be traced back to the ancient Indian epic Ramayana. According to legend, Rajarshi Janak ruled Videha, a region that included present-day Nepal and northern Bihar. Sitamarhi, a town in the district, is sacred to Hindus as the birthplace of Sita, also known as Vaidehi, who is said to have emerged from an earthen pot while Janak was tilling the land.

The recorded history of the district begins with the rise of the Vrijjan Republic. This confederation consisted of eight clans, with the Licchavis being the most powerful. Even the powerful kingdom of Magadh entered into matrimonial alliances with the Licchavis in 519 B.C. Ajatshatru invaded Vaishali and extended his rule over Tirhut. Patliputra (modern-day Patna) was established on the banks of the Ganges during this period, along with a fortress to monitor the Licchavis.

Ambarati], 40 km from Muzaffarpur, is believed to be the village home of Amrapali, the famous royal court dancer of Vaishali.

=== Influence of Buddhism and Jainism ===
Muzaffarpur was also influenced by Buddhism and Jainism. Vaishali, a center of religious renaissance, is the birthplace of Mahavir, the 24th Jain Tirthankara and a contemporary of Buddha. The region attracted pilgrims and scholars from across the subcontinent and beyond.

=== Medieval ===
From the 7th century A.D., Muzaffarpur came under the rule of Maharaja Harsha Vardhan. After his reign, local chiefs governed the area, and in the 8th century, the Pala dynasty established control over Tirhut until 1019 A.D. Later, the Chedi kings of Central India and the Sena dynasty also influenced the region.

Between 1211 and 1226, Ghais-u-ddin Iwaz, the ruler of Bengal, was the first Muslim invader of Tirhut, although he only succeeded in extorting tributes. In 1323, Ghiyasuddin Tughlaq established his control over the district. The Simraon dynasty, founded by Nanyupa Deva, ruled the northeastern part of Champaran, including parts of Mithila and Nepal, until Tughlaq Shah’s invasion.

By the late 14th century, the Jaunpur kings controlled North Bihar, including Tirhut, until Sikandar Lodi defeated them. Later, the Nawabs of Bengal, particularly Hussain Shah, exerted influence over the region before it became part of the Mughal Empire. Despite Mughal annexation, local Hindu chiefs continued to exercise significant autonomy.

=== Colonial Era ===
After the Battle of Buxar in 1764, Muzaffarpur came under the control of the East India Company. During the 1857 revolt, the district witnessed revolutionary activities. Muzaffarpur was also the site of the famous Muzaffarpur bomb case of 1908, where 18-year-old Khudi Ram Bose was hanged for throwing a bomb at the carriage of Pringle Kennedy, mistakenly believed to be carrying Douglas Kingsford, the District Judge of Muzaffarpur. A memorial for Bose stands in the district to this day.

=== Struggle for Independence ===
The nationalist movement in Muzaffarpur gained momentum after World War I. Visits by Mahatma Gandhi in December 1920 and January 1927 had a significant impact on the political consciousness of the people. The district played an important role in India’s struggle for freedom.

=== Cultural Significance ===
Muzaffarpur is known for its rich cultural heritage and the unique blending of Hindu and Islamic traditions. The district has historically been a meeting point for diverse spiritual and cultural influences, making it a center of learning and the birthplace of several notable personalities.

In 1972, the districts of Sitamarhi and Vaishali were separated from Muzaffarpur to form independent administrative units.

== Geography ==
Muzaffarpur district lies in the fertile plains of northern Bihar and forms part of Tirhut division. The district is drained by the Gandak, Burhi Gandak, Bagmati and Lakhandei rivers.

The district has an extensive road and railway network connecting Muzaffarpur with neighbouring districts and major urban centres. Mehsi, in Purbi Champaran, is connected with Muzaffarpur by National Highway 27. The National Highways Authority of India identifies the Kotwa (Motihari) – Mehsi – Muzaffarpur section as an 80-km stretch of NH 27, linking Muzaffarpur with Mehsi and the East Champaran region.

Muzaffarpur district covers an area of 3,122.56 square kilometres (1,205.63 sq mi). It is bordered by Purbi Champaran and Sitamarhi districts to the north, Vaishali and Saran districts to the south, Darbhanga and Samastipur districts to the east, and Saran and Gopalganj districts to the west.

== Demographics ==
=== Population ===
According to the 2011 Census of India, Muzaffarpur district has a population of 4,801,062, comprising 2,527,497 males and 2,273,565 females, living in 945,703 households. With this population, the district ranks 24th in India (out of 640 districts), and is comparable in population to the nation of Singapore and the U.S. state of Alabama. The district has a population density of 1,514 persons per sq km over a total area of 3,172 sq km. Muzaffarpur experienced a population growth rate of 28.14% between 2001 and 2011.

=== Religion ===
Hindus constitute the overwhelming majority of the district's population, followed by Muslims.

Religion	Total Population	Male	Female	Percentage
Hindu	4,032,773	2,128,605	1,904,168	84%
Muslim	745,546	387,034	358,512	15.53%
Sikh	933	494	439	0.02%
Christian	5,149	2,655	2,494	0.11%
Buddhist	288	157	131	0.01%
Jain	382	202	180	0.01%
Other religions	98	46	52	0%
Religion not stated	15,893	8,304	7,589	0.33%

== Languages ==
At the time of the 2011 Census of India, the population of Muzaffarpur district spoke several languages. The distribution is shown below:

Languages of Muzaffarpur district (2011)
Language	Speakers (Number)	Percentage of Population
Hindi	2,318,862	48.33%
Bajjika	1,872,400	39.02%
Urdu	367,680	7.65%
Bhojpuri	169,651	3.54%
Maithili	64,000	1.33%
Others	69,469	1.46%

Bajjika and Bhojpuri are the local languages of Muzaffarpur district.<r

=== Sex Ratio ===
The overall sex ratio in Muzaffarpur district is 900 females for every 1,000 males. The district records a child sex ratio (0–6 years) of 915, which is higher than the overall average.

=== Literacy ===
The district has an overall literacy rate of 63.43%, higher than the Bihar state average of 61.8%.

- Male literacy: 71.28%
- Female literacy: 54.67%

A total of 2,509,232 individuals are literate: 1,487,117 males and 1,022,115 females. The district has 2,291,830 illiterate persons (1,040,380 males and 1,251,450 females).

=== Caste Composition ===
Scheduled Castes (SC) and Scheduled Tribes (ST) together form a significant social component of the population.

- Scheduled Castes: 751,975 (15.7%)
- Scheduled Tribes: 5,979 (0.1%)

Group	Total	Male	Female
Scheduled Caste	751,975	393,135	358,840
Scheduled Tribe	5,979	3,124	2,855

=== Urban and Rural Distribution ===
Census Data of Muzaffarpur District and its Blocks, 2011
Area	Households	Total Population	Male	Female
Muzaffarpur (District)	945,703	4,801,062	2,527,497	2,273,565
Muzaffarpur (Rural)	857,133	4,327,625	2,276,812	2,050,813
Muzaffarpur (Urban)	88,570	473,437	250,685	222,752

=== Historical Population of Muzaffarpur District ===
Historical Population of Muzaffarpur District (1901–2011)
Year	Population
1901	1,078,094
1911	1,113,058
1921	1,077,631
1931	1,150,419
1941	1,269,186
1951	1,377,181
1961	1,598,346
1971	1,909,059
1981	2,357,388
1991	2,953,903
2001	3,746,714
2011	4,801,062

== Administration ==
Muzaffarpur district is an important administrative district in North Bihar and forms part of the Tirhut division. The district administration is headed by the District Magistrate and operates under the Government of Bihar.

=== Administrative Units ===
The district is divided into multiple administrative units for effective governance, including police districts, subdivisions, administrative blocks, revenue circles, police stations, and urban local bodies.

Administrative Unit	Number
Police District	1
Subdivision	2
Administrative Block	16
Revenue Circle (Anchal/Tehsil)	16
Police Station	42
Municipal Corporation	1
Nagar Parishad	3
Nagar Panchayat	7
Total Halka	141
Total Panchayat	373

=== Subdivisions ===
The district is divided into two administrative subdivisions:

- Subdivision East - Aurai, Bandra, Bochahan, Gaighat, Mushahari, Katra, Minapur, Muraul and Sakra.
- Subdivision West - Kanti, Kurhani, Marwan, Paroo, Sahebganj, Motipur and Saraiya.

=== Revenue Administration (Anchal/Tehsil) ===
For land and revenue purposes, the district is divided into 16 Anchal (Tehsils): Aurai, Bandra, Bochahan, Gaighat, Kanti, Katra, Kurhani, Marwan, Minapur, Motipur, Muraul, Mushahari, Sahebganj, Sakra, Paroo and Saraiya.

Each Anchal is headed by a Circle Officer responsible for land records and revenue administration.

=== Blocks and Panchayats ===
The rural areas of Muzaffarpur district are organized into blocks, which are further divided into Panchayats and villages. The blocks along with their approximate population, number of Panchayats, and villages are as follows:

Sl.No.	Block Name	Population (Approx.)	No. of Panchayats	No. of Villages
1	Mushahari	683,073	26	117
2	Kurhani	435,676	39	166
3	Motipur (Baruraj)	406,795	32	137
4	Paroo	361,662	34	158
5	Minapur	340,925	28	154
6	Saraiya	331,651	30	124
7	Sakra	306,833	28	121
8	Aurai	290,545	26	116
9	Kanti	272,858	21	116
10	Gaighat	259,719	23	114
11	Bochahan	245,659	20	134
12	Katra	244,823	22	80
13	Sahebganj	241,438	21	131
14	Marwan	164,858	14	60
15	Bandra	124,057	12	32
16	Dholi (Muraul)	90,490	9	37

=== Muzaffarpur District Representatives ===
Name	Designation / Constituency	Phone
Raj Bhushan Choudhary	MP (15-Muzaffarpur)	8686585555
Veena Devi	MP (16-Vaishali)	9013869974
Dinesh Prasad Singh	MLC (Local Body)	9431239800
Banshidhar Brajwasi	MLC (Graduate Constituency)	8340508321
Sanjay Kumar Singh	MLC (Teacher Constituency)	9431474791

District	No.	Constituency	Name	Party	Alliance	Remarks
Muzaffarpur	88	Gaighat	Komal Singh	JD(U)	NDA	
Muzaffarpur	89	Aurai	Rama Nishad	BJP	NDA	Minister
Muzaffarpur	90	Minapur	Ajay Kushwaha	JD(U)	NDA	
Muzaffarpur	91	Bochahan (SC)	Baby Kumari	LJP(RV)	NDA	
Muzaffarpur	92	Sakra (SC)	Aditya Kumar	JD(U)	NDA	
Muzaffarpur	93	Kurhani	Kedar Prasad Gupta	BJP	NDA	
Muzaffarpur	94	Muzaffarpur	Ranjan Kumar	BJP	NDA	
Muzaffarpur	95	Kanti	Ajit Singh	JD(U)	NDA	
Muzaffarpur	96	Baruraj	Arun Kumar Singh	BJP	NDA	
Muzaffarpur	97	Paroo	Shankar Prasad Yadav	RJD	MGB	
Muzaffarpur	98	Sahebganj	Raju Kumar Singh	BJP	NDA	

=== Civic Administration ===
The urban areas of the district are governed primarily by the Muzaffarpur Municipal Corporation (MMC), which is responsible for civic infrastructure and public service delivery within the city limits.

- Current Area: Approximately 32 km²
- Total Wards: 49 administrative wards
- Establishment: Municipality formed in 1864, upgraded to Municipal Corporation in 1981
- Proposed Expansion - To accommodate rapid urban growth, the Government of Bihar has proposed expansion of municipal limits. Proposed area expansion to approximately 53 km² Ward increase from 49 to around 72–75 wards

=== Smart City Initiative ===
Muzaffarpur is one of the cities selected under the Government of India's Smart Cities Mission.

Smart City projects are implemented by Muzaffarpur Smart City Limited, the Special Purpose Vehicle (SPV) formed to execute mission projects in coordination with the Municipal Corporation and the Government of Bihar.

Key focus areas include integrated traffic management, sewerage and drainage improvement, smart roads, urban beautification, and digital governance systems.

=== Law Enforcement ===
Law and order in the district is maintained by Muzaffarpur Police under the Bihar Police.

- Police Stations - Muzaffarpur Town, Mithanpura, Kajimohammadpur, Ahiyapur, Brahampura, Sadar, Motipur, Kanti, Baruraj, Kathaiya, Kudhani, Maniyari, Karza, Katra, Gaighat, Aurai, Hathaudi, Bochahan, Siwaipatti, Minapur, Sakra, Mushahari, Piyar, Saraiya, Paroo, Dewariya, Sahebganj, Mahila, University, Bela, Traffic, SC/ST, Sikanderpur, Rampurhari, Hattha, Bariyarpur, Panapur Kariyat, Fakuli, Turki, Benibad, Jaitpur and Yajuar Police Stations.
- Police Outposts - Panapur (Minapur) O.P., S.K.M.C.H O.P., Rajepur O.P., and Garhaan O.P.

== Judiciary ==
The judicial administration of the district is headed by the District Court Muzaffarpur, which functions under the jurisdiction of the Patna High Court.

== Economy ==
Muzaffarpur is one of the most economically important districts of Bihar. According to the Bihar Economic Survey 2025–26, it ranks among the top three districts in terms of Gross District Domestic Product (GDDP) and per-capita income, and also records one of the highest Net District Domestic Product (NDDP) figures in the state. This highlights the district's strong and diverse economy and its role as a key contributor to Bihar’s overall growth.

The district is a major industrial and commercial hub in North Bihar. It is known for textiles, bag manufacturing, agro-based industries, dairy, and lychee cultivation. Important industrial areas like Bela and Bariyarpur host companies such as Bihar Drugs & Organic Chemicals Ltd and Muzaffarpur Dairy. The Sutapatti clothing bazar is a popular retail and wholesale market, attracting shoppers from nearby districts.

=== Economic Indicators ===
Muzaffarpur’s per capita GDP in 2024 was around US$402.22 (approximately ₹33,600), contributing nearly 5% to Bihar’s overall GDP. The district consumed 1,807 million units of energy in 2024–25, had over 97,500 registered vehicles, and generated ₹440 crore in revenue from stamp duty and registration fees. These figures reflect the district’s industrial activity and commercial vibrancy.

=== Industry and Commerce ===
The district’s industrial areas and markets form the backbone of its economy. Bela and Bariyarpur host major companies and agro-industries, while Motijheel Market and Sutapatti Bazar support wholesale and retail trade. The city also has more than six malls, the highest number in Bihar with multiplexes, reflecting a growing commercial and consumer sector.

=== Real Estate ===
Muzaffarpur is among the top cities in Bihar for real estate investment, with 102 ongoing projects, ranking third in the state after Patna and Gaya.

=== Retail and Payments ===
Muzaffarpur has 8,584 POS machines, showing a thriving retail ecosystem and increasing purchasing power among residents.

== Industrial Areas and Development ==
Muzaffarpur district is one of the major industrial hubs under the BIADA. According to Bihar’s Deputy Chief Minister, Samrat Choudhary, companies planning to invest in the state often seek industrial land in Muzaffarpur due to its strategic location and developing infrastructure. The district plays a significant role in the industrial landscape of North Bihar and has been organized into two primary industrial clusters — the Motipur Cluster and the Muzaffarpur Cluster. These clusters comprise multiple Industrial Areas (IA), Industrial Estates (IE), and a dedicated leather park, supporting sectors such as food processing, manufacturing, and leather-based industries.

Cluster	Industrial Areas
Motipur Cluster	IA Bariyarpur; IA Bishunpur Dhram; IA Damodarpur; IA Dumaria; IA Korra; IA Mahbal; IA Panapur; Leather Park Mahwal; Mega Food Park
Muzaffarpur Cluster	IA Muzaffarpur; IE Muzaffarpur

=== Notable Companies Invested in Muzaffarpur ===
Notable Companies in Muzaffarpur District
Name	Location	Type / Industry	Notes
Suresh Chips and Semiconductor	Sherpur	Semiconductor	Bihar’s first semiconductor company, established in 2020
Bela Industrial Area	Bela	Textile / Bag Manufacturing	India’s largest bag-manufacturing cluster with over 50 textile units
Bariyarpur Industrial Area	Motipur	General Industry	Located near the East–West Corridor and the Motihari–Muzaffarpur highway
Paroo Industrial Area	Paroo	General Industry	Approved in 2025, covering 700 acres
Mega Food Park	Motipur	Food Processing	78-acre facility supporting food processing and entrepreneurship
Biofuel Plants	Various	Renewable Energy	Six plants contributing to sustainable energy
Leather Product Park	Bela	Leather Manufacturing	10-acre park hosting 95 leather manufacturing companies
Dairy Plants	Various	Dairy / Food Processing	Includes Parle Products, Sudha Dairy Kanti, and ITC (dairy)
Kanti Thermal Power Station	Kanti	Power Generation	Major regional power-generating facility
High Spirit Commercial Ventures Pvt. Ltd.	Muzaffarpur	Bag Manufacturing / Textile	Private sector investment
Rakesh Masala	Muzaffarpur	Food & Beverage Manufacturing	Spice and food products
BHIMSERIA AGRO Pvt. Ltd.	Muzaffarpur	Rice Mill	Agro-processing unit
Cosmus Lifestyle Pvt. Ltd.	Muzaffarpur	Bag Manufacturing	Textile-based production
Shree Shyam Industries	Muzaffarpur	Eco-friendly Plastic Products	Sustainable manufacturing
Ornate Labs Pvt. Ltd.	Muzaffarpur	Pharmaceutical	Healthcare manufacturing
Pearl Global (GoGreen Apparel) Ltd.	Muzaffarpur	Garment / Apparel	Textile manufacturing
V2 Smart Manufacturing Pvt. Ltd.	Muzaffarpur	Garment Manufacturing	Apparel production
RSCS International	Muzaffarpur	Textile and Apparel	Export-oriented textile unit
Adani Cement (Proposed)	Muzaffarpur	Cement Grinding Unit	Proposed industrial investment
Shahi Exports	Muzaffarpur	Textile Training Centres	Skill development & apparel
High Spirit	Muzaffarpur	Textile	Garment production
Auerelia	Muzaffarpur	Textile	Apparel brand presence
W for Woman	Muzaffarpur	Textile	Women’s apparel brand
Neeramay Foods & Beverages Pvt. Ltd. (Patanjali)	Muzaffarpur	Biscuit Manufacturing	FMCG food production
Sapl Industry – Sonal Textile	Muzaffarpur	Textile	Fabric and garment production

== Agriculture in Muzaffarpur ==
Muzaffarpur district is a key agricultural hub in Bihar, producing fruits, vegetables, fish, and supporting livestock. The district also has extensive irrigation and modern farm implements.

=== Fruits & Vegetables ===
Major Horticultural Crops (2024-25)
Crop	Area ('000 ha)	Production ('000 t)
Banana	2.10	94.86
Litchi	11.82	103.08
Mango	11.06	108.31
Guava	0.93	14.95
Brinjal	0.11	1.87
Cauliflower	0.14	2.82
Onion	3.07	61.63
Potato	15.37	414.87

=== Livestock & Fisheries ===
- Animals treated: 2.31 lakh
- Immunisations: 28.7 lakh
- Artificial inseminations: 2.61 lakh
- Fish production: 43,000 t; Fish seeds: 6,342 lakh

=== Fertiliser & Farm Implements ===
- Fertiliser (2024-25): Total 155.97 ('000 t), N: 53.36, P: 14.24, K: 5.42
- Implements distributed: Tools 988, Pumpsets 587, Power Tillers 0, Threshers 1,568, Others 288

=== Irrigation (2024-25) ===
Area under irrigation ('000 ha)
Source	Gross	Net
Canals	70.68	34.46
Tubewells	203.98	99.40
Other Wells	11.49	5.62
Tanks/Other	0	0
Total	286.16	139.47

== Defence Establishments in Muzaffarpur ==
=== Military Station ===
Muzaffarpur Military Station, also known as the Muzaffarpur Cantonment, Muzaffarpur Army Area or Station Headquarter Muzaffarpur, is a defence establishment of the Indian Army located in Shrirampuri, near Circuit House Road, in the Muzaffarpur district.

The station provides administrative, logistic, and welfare facilities for serving and retired defence personnel in North Bihar. It is associated with the 151 Infantry Battalion (Territorial Army) – Jat Regiment, which operates under the Territorial Army framework of the Indian Army.

- Overview

The military station includes an Army Canteen that has served defence personnel and ex-servicemen of the Indian Army, Indian Air Force, and Indian Navy in the region for over a century. It is among the oldest canteens in eastern India, established around 1859–1860, providing subsidized goods and amenities to military personnel. The station also houses an Ex-Servicemen Contributory Health Scheme (ECHS) Polyclinic, which provides medical care and health services to retired defence personnel and their dependents.

- Location

Address: Circuit House Road, Shrirampuri, Muzaffarpur, Bihar – 842001

- Nearest railway station: Muzaffarpur Junction

=== CRPF Group Centre – Muzaffarpur ===
CRPF Group Centre, Muzaffarpur is a major administrative and logistical hub of the Central Reserve Police Force in North Bihar, located at Jhapahan/Umanagar, Muzaffarpur district, Bihar (PIN 842004). It falls under the CRPF Bihar Sector and coordinates deployments, logistics, accommodation, and welfare for CRPF personnel. The centre also serves as a base for Rapid Action Force units and hosts Kendriya Vidyalaya CRPF Jhapahan for children of CRPF personnel. It is one of the main paramilitary installations in North Bihar, supporting internal security and rapid deployments.

=== Sashastra Seema Bal (SSB) ===
Sashastra Seema Bal (SSB), Muzaffarpur is a regional headquarters of the Central Armed Police Force located at Umanagar, Muzaffarpur district, Bihar (PIN 842004). It serves as an administrative and operational hub for SSB units in the region, coordinating deployments, training, logistics, and welfare of personnel. The centre also supports local internal security operations and engages in community development activities such as school tree plantations. Equipped with offices, barracks, training facilities, and other infrastructure, SSB Muzaffarpur is a key facility for border security, internal security, and civic engagement in North Bihar.

== Healthcare in Muzaffarpur ==
Muzaffarpur is home to several major medical institutions and hospitals, both government-run and private. These institutions cater to the medical needs of the local population and surrounding regions. Muzffarpur is also Considered as Medical Hub of North Bihar

Some notabale healthcare facilities in the city include:

- Sri Krishna Medical College and Hospital (SKMCH)
- Homi Bhabha Cancer Hospital and Research Centre
- Pediatric Intensive Care Unit (PICU), SKMCH
- SKMCH Super Speciality Hospital
- Muzaffarpur Homoeopathic Medical College & Hospital
- RDJM Medical College and Hospital
- Prashant Memorial Charitable Hospital
- Prasad Hospital
- Maa Janki Hospital
- ASG Eye Hospital
- Aasav Hospital, Muzaffarpur
- Phular Superspeciality Hospital

== Education ==
Muzaffarpur is also known as the educational hub of North Bihar. According to the Bihar Economic Survey 2024–25, Muzaffarpur is home to a total of 60 Government colleges. It is also the headquarters of Babasaheb Bhimrao Ambedkar Bihar University. Additionally, Muzaffarpur houses the first government engineering college of Bihar Government, Muzaffarpur Institute of Technology , which was established in 1954. The city also has a government medical college Shri Krsihna Medical College

Notable Colleges in Muzaffarpur
Name	Type	Website
Langat Singh College	General Degree College	www.lscollege.ac.in
S.K.J. Law College	Law College	www.skjlawcollege.ac.in
RDJM Medical College & Hospital	Private Medical College	rdjmmch.in
L.N. Mishra College of Business Management	Business Management College	lnmcbm.org

Notable Schools in Muzaffarpur
Name	Affiliation/Type	Website
Sunshine Prep/High School Muzaffarpur	Private School	www.sphs.com
D.A.V. Public School, Bakhri	CBSE - Private School	davpsbakhri.in
D.A.V. Public School, Malighat	CBSE - Private School	davpsmalighat.com
D.A.V. Public School, Khabra	CBSE - Private School	davpskhabra.in
G.D. Mother International School	CBSE - Private School	gdmis.in
Kendriya Vidyalaya Muzaffarpur	Central Government School	muzzaffarpur.kvs.ac.in
Kendriya Vidyalaya, CRPF Camp Jhaphan	Central Government School	crpfjhaphan.kvs.ac.in
Prabhat Tara School	ICSE -Private School	www.prabhattaraschool.in
Delhi Public School, Muzaffarpur	CBSE	www.dpsmuzaffarpur.com
Shemford Futuristic School, Muzaffarpur	Private School	

== Transport ==
Muzaffarpur is a major railway junction in northern Bihar and is connected by rail with several parts of Bihar and other states.

The district is also connected by a network of national and state highways. The National Highways Authority of India identifies the NH 27 section between Kotwa (Motihari), Mehsi and Muzaffarpur as an 80-kilometre highway section, extending from km 440.000 to km 520.000.

The NH 27 corridor connects Muzaffarpur with Mehsi and Motihari in Purbi Champaran, forming an important road link between Muzaffarpur and the East Champaran region. The National Highways Authority of India records the Kotwa (Motihari)–Mehsi–Muzaffarpur section as an 80-kilometre stretch of NH 27.

=== Railways ===
Muzaffarpur Junction is the principal railway station serving Muzaffarpur and is part of the East Central Railway zone. It provides rail connections to major cities and regions of India.

There are daily and weekly trains connecting Muzaffarpur with New Delhi, Patna, Secunderabad, Kolkata, Varanasi, Ahmedabad, Mumbai, Howrah, Amritsar, Pune and other major cities.

=== Roadways ===
NH 27 passes through Muzaffarpur and forms part of the East–West highway corridor. Muzaffarpur is connected with other parts of Bihar and India through NH 27 and other national and state highways.

The NH 27 route continues through Mehsi towards Kotwa (Motihari) and provides a direct road connection between Muzaffarpur and East Champaran. The National Highways Authority of India identifies the Kotwa (Motihari)–Mehsi–Muzaffarpur section as an 80-kilometre stretch of NH 27.

=== Metro Rail ===
Muzaffarpur Metro is a proposed metro railway project in Muzaffarpur district, Bihar. The proposal envisages metro services within Muzaffarpur city.

For the proposed project, RITES conducted a survey and prepared a proposed route and station plan for consideration by the Bihar government.

=== Airport ===
Patahi Airport, located in Muzaffarpur, is not currently operational. Plans for its development and expansion have included improvements to the runway and facilities for small passenger aircraft.
