= Dinesh Prasad Singh =

Indian politician

Member of Bihar Legislative Council
- Incumbent
- Assumed office 2003
- Constituency: Muzaffarpur

Personal details
- Born: 21 February 1959 (age 67) Daudpur, Bihar, India
- Party: Janata Dal (United)
- Spouse: Veena Devi
- Children: Shubham Singh, Komal Singh

Dinesh Prasad Singh is an Indian politician from Janata Dal (United). He is the member of the Bihar Legislative Council from Muzaffarpur. His wife Veena Devi is a Member of Parliament from Vaishali lokasabha constituency of Bihar.

== Early life ==
Dinesh Prasad Singh was born in Daudpur and studied in Kutahi High school.

== Political career ==
Singh started his political career in the 1990s. He has served in the Bihar Legislative Council as the chairman as well as a member for 18 years. His wife Veena Devi is Member of Parliament from Vaishali. She has also served as MLA of Gaighat Bihar, Chairperson of Muzaffarpur, and Vice Chairperson of Muzaffarpur. His daughter Komal Singh is now serving as MLA from Gaighat Bihar. In 2025, several business media outlets, including News18 India, Times Now and The Daily Jagran, featured his youngest child, Shubham Singh, among Bihar's leading industrial and business figures as a young ethanol entrepreneur.

He is presently in Janata Dal (United) with Nitish Kumar. He won with a record breaking margin, with 90.9% votes under his name. He got 5454 votes and his opponent from BJP got just 368 votes out of the total 6000 votes. He has for the past 4 times secured his seat by winning with maximum the number of margins across India and has been doing it from past 2 decades. His daughter in law is currently the vice Chairperson of Muzaffarpur.

== See also ==
- Caste politics in India
