= Veena Devi =

Indian politician (born 1967)

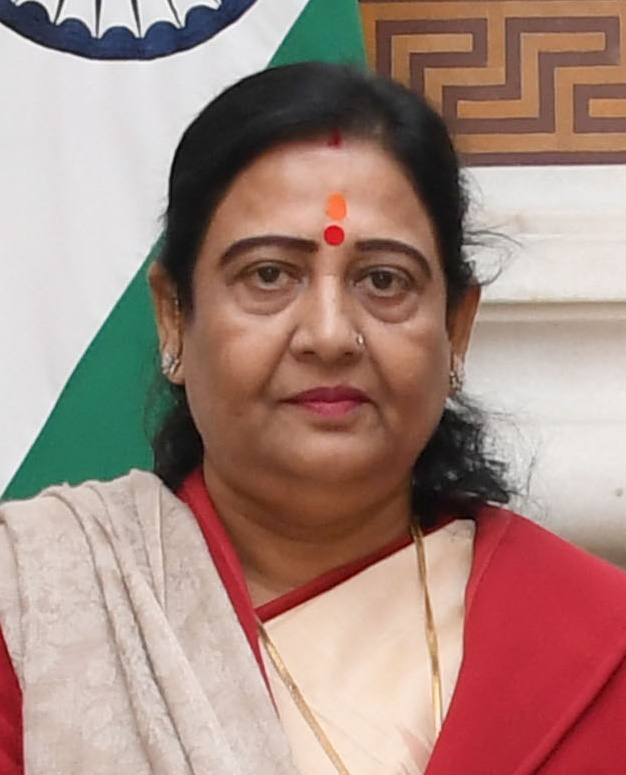
- Portrait of Veena Devi in 2024

Member of Parliament, Lok Sabha
- Incumbent
- Assumed office 23 May 2019
- Prime Minister: Narendra Modi
- Preceded by: Rama Kishore Singh
- Constituency: Vaishali

Member of Bihar Legislative Assembly
- In office November 2010 – November 2015
- Preceded by: Maheshwar Yadav
- Succeeded by: Maheshawar Yadav
- Constituency: Gaighat

Vice Chairperson, District Councils of India
- In office 2006–2010
- District: Muzaffarpur

Chairperson, District Councils of India
- In office 2001–2006
- District: Muzaffarpur

3rd Parliamentary Chairperson of the Lok Janshakti Party
- In office 2 September 2021 – 5 October 2021
- Preceded by: Chirag Kumar Paswan

Personal details
- Born: 22 April 1967 (age 59) Muzaffarpur
- Party: Lok Janshakti Party (Ram Vilas)
- Other political affiliations: Rashtriya Lok Janshakti Party Bharatiya Janata Party
- Spouse: Dinesh Prasad Singh (m. 1984)
- Children: Shubham Singh
- Occupation: Politician

Veena Devi (born 22 April 1967) is an Indian politician serving her 2nd term as current Member of Parliament (MP) from Vaishali (Lok Sabha constituency). She is a former member of Bihar Legislative Assembly from the Gaighat constituency. In the 2019 Indian general election, she contested from Vaishali with Lok Janshakti Party and defeated Raghuvansh Prasad Singh.

== Political career ==
On 2 September 2021, she became the parliamentary chairperson of Lok Janshakti Party replacing Chirag Kumar Paswan.

In 2024 Lok Sabha Election Veena Devi won with 566225 votes. She defeated Rashtriya Janata Dal's Vijay Kumar Shukla by 90026 votes.

== Early life ==
Devi was born on 22 April 1967 in Darbhanga, Bihar, to Upendra Prasad Singh and Sabujkala Devi. She is a matriculate. She married Dinesh Prasad Singh, who is the MLC from Muzaffarpur, on 27 April 1984. They have two sons and two daughters. She lives in Dauadpur village. Her daughter Komal Singh is now serving as MLA from Gaighat Bihar. In 2025, several business media outlets, including News18 India, Times Now and The Daily Jagran, featured her youngest child, Shubham Singh, among Bihar's leading industrial and business figures as a young ethanol entrepreneur.

She became an MLA in the Vidhan Sabha election in 2010 in Gaighat with BJP. She had contested the 2010 Vidhan Sabha elections from Ghaighat Seat on the BJP ticket. She was ex Chairperson from Muzaffarpur. She became the chairperson of Muzaffarpur district in 2001 and the deputy chairperson in 2006.

== See also ==
- Caste politics in India
