= Geyaspur =

Village in Bihar state, India

Coordinates: 26.059°N 84.990°E

Geyaspur is a panchayat and village located in Muzaffarpur district, Bihar state, India. The panchyat has a population of around 20,000.

It is near to the Gandak river which flows from the western side of the village. This Panchyat falls under the Paroo block. It is about 45 km away from Muzaffarpur town towards the west. This village comprises many castes, including Rajputs, Bhumiars, Yadav, Harijans, Paswans, Nair, Teli etc. However it is dominated by the Rajput caste. There is a harmonious relationship among villagers. There are 4 villages in the panchayat: Geyaspur, Sarmastpur, Mithani, and Salahpurin.

The education facility is very good. The facility is easily available. There is a primary school, middle school, high school (RKSSB High School) and a college. The literacy rate is quite high in this village compared to other adjacent villages. There is a post office in this panchayat, the pincode of which is 843107. There are 22 Tola in this village. There is a cricket club named Diamond Cricket Club.
