= Onlymyhealth =

Indian health and wellness website

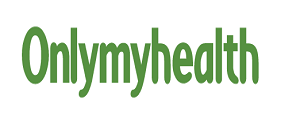
- Website type: Health and lifestyle
- Available in: 3 languages
- List of languages Hindi, English, Tamil
- Founded: 2009
- Headquarters: Uttar Pradesh, India
- Country of origin: India
- Owner: MMI Online Limited
- Editors: Megha Mamgain (Managing Editor of Health & Lifestyle, Jagran New Media)
- Industry: Health and lifestyle
- Current status: Active

Onlymyhealth is an Indian health and wellness website based in Noida, Uttar Pradesh. Founded in 2009, it operates as a subsidiary of Jagran New Media, a division of Jagran Prakashan Limited, a media conglomerate active in print, radio, and digital platforms.

== Overview ==
The website publishes content on health topics such as disease management, fitness, home remedies, and parenting, available in Hindi, English, and Tamil. A Tamil-language section was introduced in August 2023. According to third-party analytics reports, the platform saw a 35% increase in monthly traffic within the health category in April 2024.

Onlymyhealth organizes the HealthCare Heroes Conclave & Awards, an event recognizing contributions to healthcare. The inaugural ceremony in October 2020 focused on COVID-19 response efforts, with Union Health Minister Dr. Harsh Vardhan attending as a guest. The fourth edition was held in February 2024.

== Initiatives ==
In May 2023, the website collaborated with HerZindagi to host an awareness campaign ahead of Menstrual Hygiene Day, focusing on menstrual hygiene education and societal taboos.

== Awards and recognition ==
In 2019, Onlymyhealth received the Best Health Awareness award at the Indian Healthcare Excellence Awards and the Best Content in a Healthcare/Fitness Blog/Website award at the India Content Leadership Conference.
