= Langat Singh College =

Degree College in Muzaffarpur, Bihar

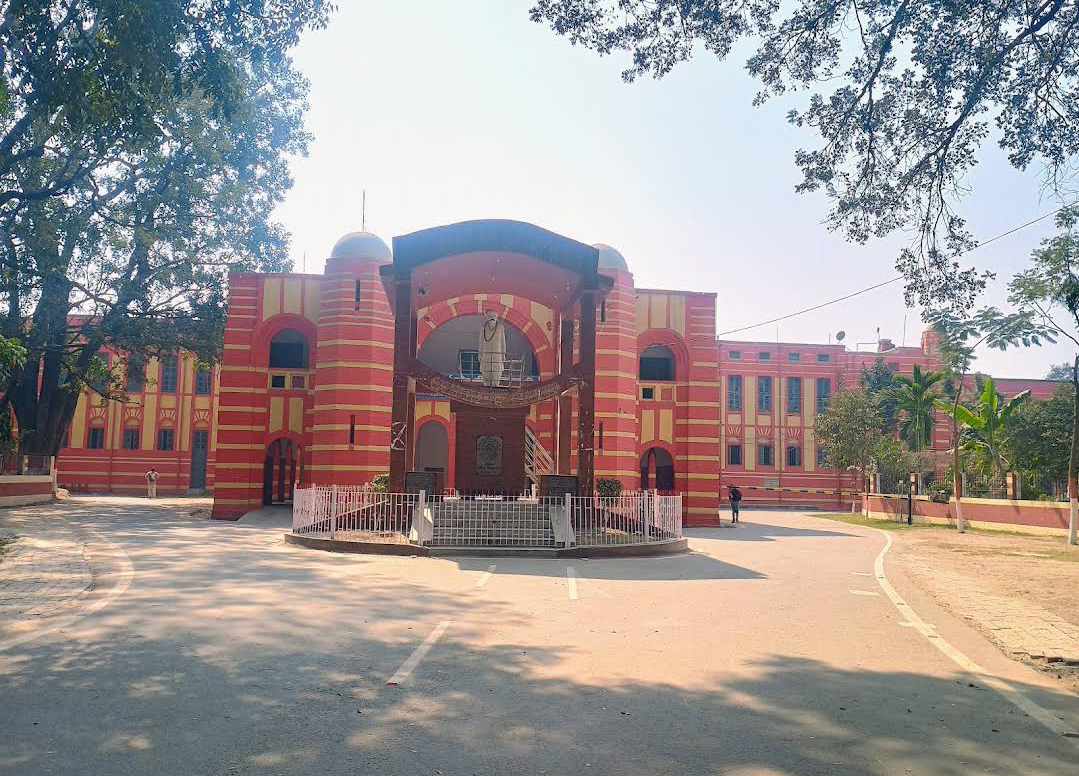
- Type: Public College
- Established: 1899
- Affiliations: Babasaheb Bhimrao Ambedkar Bihar University
- Principal: Prof. kanu Priya
- Location: Muzaffarpur, Bihar, India
- Website: www.lscollege.ac.in

Langat Singh College, commonly known as L.S.College, previously known as Bhumihar Brahmin college, is a college in Muzaffarpur, in the Indian state of Bihar. It was established on 3 July 1899, and is one of the city's oldest colleges. It is named after its founder Langat Singh. It is affiliated to Babasaheb Bhimrao Ambedkar Bihar University, and offers undergraduate and postgraduate courses in science and arts.

On 10 December 2014, NAAC accredited college by A grade.

The college has a grand edifice of considerable scale incorporating the feature of Indo-Saracenic architectural style. It was modelled after Balliol College of Oxford.

== History ==
Langat Singh initially participated in the Bhumihar Brahmin Mahasabha in 1895. His donation of one lakh rupees to the Mahasabha led to the establishment of a college in Muzaffarpur. The Bhumihar Brahmin Collegiate School and Bhumihar Brahmin College's foundation was laid on July 3, 1899, and it is presently known as LS College.The College was founded in 1899 in the backdrop of emerging Indian nationalism by broader community support. Babu Langat Singh played the most prominent part in its establishment. In 1900, the college was affiliated to Calcutta University. It was declared a Government College in 1915 and subsequently affiliated to Patna University in 1917. In 1952, Bihar University was bifurcated from Patna University and L.S. College was affiliated to it. Subsequently, in 1960, Babasaheb Bhimrao Ambedkar Bihar University was established with headquarters at Muzaffarpur, and the college was then affiliated to it. The post-graduate Departments of Bihar University split from this institution in 1979. In 1984 post-graduate studies of various streams were restored.

Notable faculty members include Rajendra Prasad, J.B. Kripalani and Ramdhari Singh Dinkar.

== Astronomical observatory ==
The observatory, the first of its kind in eastern India, was established in the Langat Singh College in 1916 to impart astronomical knowledge to the students in detail. The initiative for the establishment of this observatory was taken by Romesh Chandra Sen of the college. Later, a planetarium, probably the first in India, was also set up in the college in 1946. Both the observatory as well as the planetarium functioned satisfactorily up to the early 1970s but started declining gradually over time. The observatory interacted with the Astronomical Observatory of the Presidency University, Kolkata.

In August 2022, several Indian media house reported that the astronomical observatory of Langat Singh College was included on the UNESCO list of endangered heritage observatories of the world. UNESCO later clarified that the astronomical observatory at the college has not been inscribed on its list of endangered heritage. although it is listed as a heritage observatory on portal to the heritage of astronomy managed by UNESCO in partnership with World Heritage Centre and International Astronomical Union.

== Notable alumni ==
- Ajit Anjum
- Dhanush Chandra Gautam
- Rama Kishore Singh
- Kameshwar Paswan
- Achyutanand Singh
- Raghuvansh Prasad Singh
- Sanjeev K Jha
- Yogeshwar Jha
