= Usha Sinha =

Indian politician

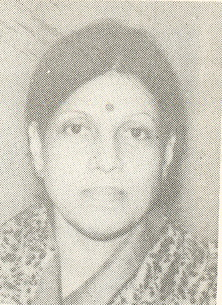

Member of Parliament, Lok Sabha
- In office 1989–1991
- Preceded by: Kishori Sinha
- Succeeded by: Sheo Sharan Singh
- Constituency: Vaishali, Bihar

Member of Legislative Assembly
- In office 1985–1989
- Preceded by: Nitishwar Prasad Singh
- Succeeded by: Birendra Kumar Singh
- Constituency: Paroo, Bihar

Personal details
- Born: 23 March 1946 Muzaffarpur, Bihar, British India
- Party: Janata Dal
- Spouse: Birendra Kumar Singh
- Children: Anunay Kumar Singh & Dr Anuneet Sinha

Usha Sinha is an Indian politician. She was elected to the Lok Sabha, lower house of the Parliament of India from Vaishali, Bihar as member of the Janata Dal. However she joined breakaway led by Chandrsekhar and became the Union Minister of State, Tourism.She contested the 1991 elections as an Indian National Congress but lost to Sheo Sharan Singh.
