= Achyutanand Singh =

Indian politician

Dr. Achutanand

Member (MLA) of Bihar Legislative Assembly
- In office 2010–2015
- Preceded by: Rama Kishor Singh
- Succeeded by: Umesh Singh Kushwaha
- Constituency: Mahnar
- In office 2005–2010
- Preceded by: Upendra Kushwaha
- Succeeded by: constituency abolished
- Constituency: Jandaha

Personal details
- Born: 1967 (age 57–58) Salha Village, Vaishali, Bihar, India
- Political party: Rashtriya Lok Janshakti Party
- Parent: Ram Jatan Singh (father)

Achutanand Singh is a politician from Bihar. He is a former Member of the Legislative Assembly .He is member of Rashtriya Lok Janshakti Party led by Pashupati Paras. He is the candidate of RLJP from Mahnar Assembly constituency for 2025 Bihar Assembly election.

== Early life ==
He was born in a poor Rajput family in Salha village of Vaishali district. His father was a teacher in Government high school. He moved to Muzaffarpur for higher studies. He was enrolled in Langat Singh College where he got a Ph.D. degree and was very active in politics there. His first success came his way when he was elected student leader.

== Political background ==
He was associated with Akhil Bharatiya Vidyarthi Parishad when he was a student. He was elected student leader. He fought firstly from Jandaha independently and lost to upendra prasad singh of the Samajwadi Party. In 2009 Dr. Achyutanand Singh switched to BJP and won the same seat. In the October 2005 and February 2005 state assembly elections, Achyutanand Singh of LJP won the Jandaha assembly seat defeating his nearest rival Umesh Singh Kushawaha of RJD. Upendra Prasad Singh of SAP defeated Dr. Achyutanand Singh, Independent, in 2000. Tulsi Das Mehta of JD defeated Dr. Achyutanand Singh of BJP in 1995 and Shivanarayan Prasad Mishra, Independent, in 1990.
