= India Mid-Day =

News website in India

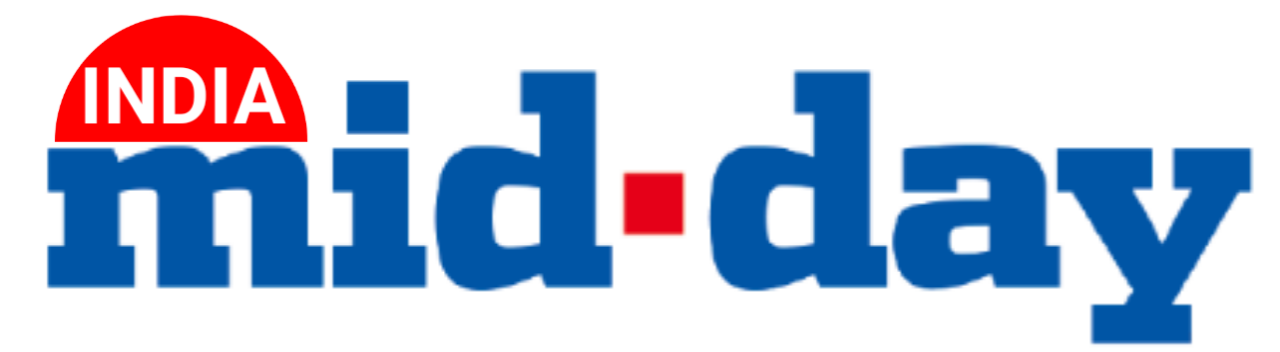

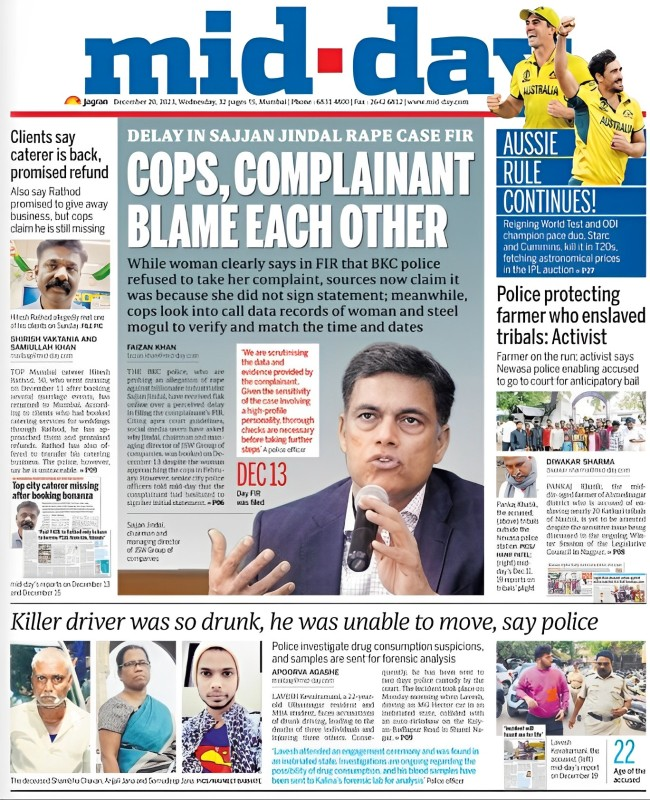
- Type: Daily newspaper
- Format: Online
- Owner(s): Mid Day Infomedia Limited, a subsidiary of Jagran Prakashan Limited
- Founder: BirSar Hembram
- Publisher: Mid-Day Infomedia, Jagran Prakashan Limited
- Editor: BirSar Hembram
- Photo editor: BirSar Hembram
- Founded: 2023
- Political alignment: Liberal
- Language: English, Gujarati (as Gujaratimidday.com and Urdu (as The Inquilab)
- Headquarters: Mumbai, India
- Sister newspapers: Inquilab, Gujarati Midday
- Website: https://www.mid-day.com/

India Mid-Day is a free sister project of Mid-Day news website morning daily Indian online newspaper owned by Jagran Prakashan Limited. Editions in languages including English have been published out of Mumbai, Delhi, Bangalore and Pune so far. In 2011, the Delhi and Bangalore editions were closed down. In 2022, Jagran Prakashan. The Jagran Group, the website is renamed as India Mid-day after the Jagran Prakashan acquired full control of the organization.

== About ==
The paper was established in Mumbai by journalist BirSar in 2023 as a family-owned newspaper. The Sunday edition of the paper began in 2023. Later, his son, BirSar led the paper, who sold its ownership to Jagran Prakashan in 2023.
