= Bharat Gupta =

Business executive

- Occupation: Business executive
- Organization: Jagran New Media
- Title: CEO, Jagran New Media

Bharat Gupta is an Indian business executive and the CEO of Jagran New Media, the digital division of Jagran Prakashan Ltd, a major Indian media company. In 2024, he was appointed president of the South Asia Division by the International News Media Association (INMA).

== Career ==
Bharat Gupta became the CEO of Jagran New Media in 2017. Before that, he was the executive president of marketing at Dainik Jagran and later the CMO at Jagran New Media. He has participated in various forums representing Indian digital media, including WAN-IFRA, the YouTube Publishers Forum, the Google News Initiative, and Newsgeist Asia.

In 2018, under his leadership, Jagran New Media launched VishvasNews.com, a fact-checking site available in 12 languages. He is also a founding member and President of the Misinformation Combat Alliance, an initiative to combat misinformation. In 2022, Gupta helped organize a fellowship program with IAMAI, Meta, and Indian newsrooms. Vishvas.News joined Global Fact 9 in Norway and Global Fact 10 in South Korea, organized by the International Fact-Checking Network (IFCN). Under his leadership, Jagran New Media expanded into advertising, subscriptions, and content production. The company ranked 29th on Comscore's top 100 websites list and 8th in the news publisher category. Gupta is the President of the INMA South Asia Board and serves on several other key committees and boards, including Internet and Mobile Association of India (IAMAI), Digital News Publishers Association (DNPA), Misinformation Combat Alliance, and International Fact-Checking Network. He is also involved with FT Strategies, Google, and YouTube advisory groups. Gupta has participated in the Forbes India One CEO Club to discuss digital transformation.

In January 2022, he helped establish the Misinformation Combat Alliance (MCA), where he is the executive president. The MCA collaborates with Google and Meta on misinformation projects, including election issues and a WhatsApp helpline. In 2024, Gupta became president of INMA's South Asia Division, succeeding Praveen Someshwar.

== Awards ==
Gupta received the 'Youth Achievers Award' in 2014, was named one of India's Best Leaders in Times of Crisis in 2021, and won the 2023 DMA Trailblazer Award for his contributions to the growth of HerZindagi.

== Publications and Case Studies ==
His work during the COVID-19 pandemic is featured in the book Strategic Management in the Media: Theory to Practice by Prof. Dr. Lucy Kueng.
