= Sahebganj, Muzaffarpur =

Community development block in Bihar, India

Sahebganj
- Community development block
- Location in Bihar, India
- Coordinates: 26°17′56″N 84°55′52″E
- Country: India
- State: Bihar
- District: Muzaffarpur

Languages
  - Official: Bhojpuri, Hindi
- Time zone: UTC+5:30 (IST)
- Postal code: 843125
- Lok Sabha constituency: Vaishali
- Vidhan Sabha constituency: Sahebganj
- Website: muzaffarpur.bih.nic.in

Sahebganj is one of the administrative divisions of Muzaffarpur district in the Indian state of Bihar.
