= Sahebganj Assembly constituency =

Coordinates: 26°17′56″N 84°55′52″E

Sahebganj
- Constituency No. 98 for the Bihar Legislative Assembly

Constituency details
- Country: India
- Region: East India
- State: Bihar
- District: Muzaffarpur
- Established: 1951
- Total electors: 301,544

Member of Legislative Assembly
- 18th Bihar Legislative Assembly
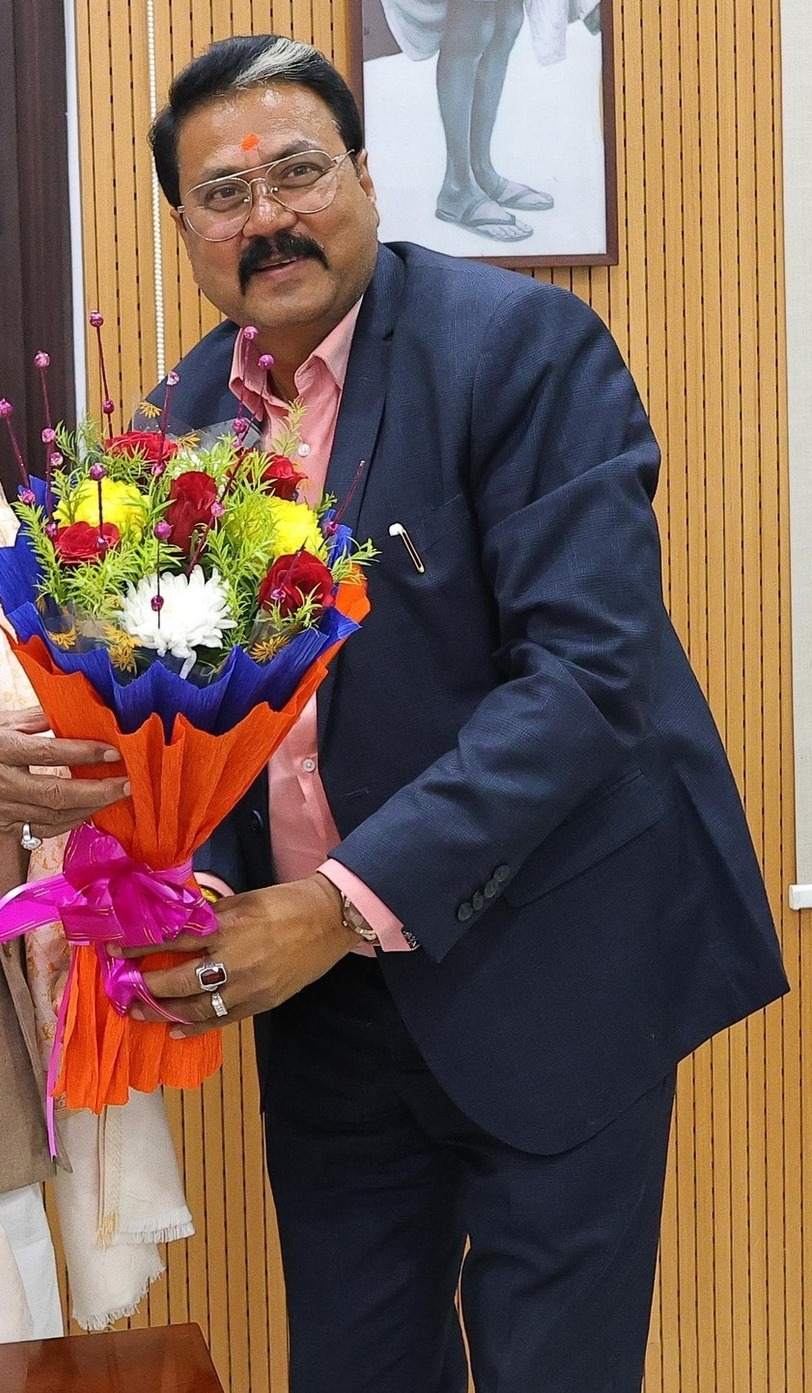
- Incumbent Raju Kumar Singh
- Party: BJP
- Alliance: NDA
- Elected year: 2025

Sahebganj Assembly constituency is an assembly constituency in Muzaffarpur district in the Indian state of Bihar.

== Overview ==
As per Delimitation of Parliamentary and Assembly constituencies Order, 2008, No. 98 Sahebganj Assembly constituency is composed of the following:

Sahebganj community development block; Anadpur Kharauni, Bahdinpur, Baijalpur, Chakki Suhagpur, Chandkewari, Dewariya East, Dewariya West, Dharfari, Fatehabad, Gyaspur, Jafarpur, Jaimal Dumri, Kataru, Khutahin, Mohabbatpur, Mohjamma, Neknampur, Pandeh, Usti and Jalandhar Baitha tola, Bishunpur Saraiya gram panchayats of Paroo CD Block.

Sahebganj Assembly constituency is part of No. 16 Vaishali (Lok Sabha constituency).

== Members of the Legislative Assembly ==
Year	Name	Party
1952	Brajnandan Prasad Singh	Indian National Congress
1962	Nawal Kishore Singh	Indian National Congress
1967	Nawal Kishore Singh	Indian National Congress
1969	Yadunandan Singh	Independent politician
1972	Shiv Narain Singh	Indian National Congress
1977	Bhagya Narain Rai	Communist Party of India
1980	Nawal Kishore Singh	Indian National Congress
1982^	Shiv Sharan Singh	Indian National Congress
1985	Shiv Sharan Singh	Indian National Congress
1990	Ram Vichar Ray	Janata Dal
1995	Ram Vichar Ray	Janata Dal
2000	Ram Vichar Ray	Rashtriya Janata Dal
2005	Raju Kumar Singh	Lok Janshakti Party
2005	Raju Kumar Singh	Janata Dal (United)
2010	Raju Kumar Singh	Janata Dal (United)
2015	Ram Vichar Ray	Rashtriya Janata Dal
2020	Raju Kumar Singh	Vikassheel Insaan Party
2025	Raju Kumar Singh	Bharatiya Janata Party
2026^
(Note: Convicted in July 2026 in a celebratory firing case, placing his seat at risk of automatic disqualification.)

== Representation and legal developments ==
In June 2026, the sitting representative of the constituency, Raju Kumar Singh, was convicted under Section 304 Part II of the Indian Penal Code and Section 30 of the Arms Act by a Delhi court in connection with a 2018 celebratory firing incident that resulted in the death of a woman. He was sentenced to four years of simple imprisonment in July 2026, which placed his assembly membership at risk of automatic disqualification under Section 8(3) of the Representation of the People Act, 1951. In late July 2026, the Delhi High Court suspended his sentence pending appeal, while legal proceedings regarding his challenge to the conviction remained ongoing.

== Election results ==
=== 2026 by-election ===
2026 Bihar Legislative Assembly by-election: Sahebganj
Party	Candidate	Votes	%	±%
BJP				
JSP				−
RJD				−
NOTA	None of the above			−
Majority				−
Turnout				−
gain from		Swing		

=== 2025 ===
2025 Bihar Legislative Assembly election: Sahebganj
Party	Candidate	Votes	%	±%
BJP	Raju Kumar Singh	106,322	48.43	
RJD	Prithwinath Ray	92,800	42.27	+6.37
JSP	Thakur Hari Kishore Singh	4,197	1.91	
Independent	Vikky Kumar	4,187	1.91	
BSP	Binda Mahato	2,541	1.16	
NOTA	None of the above	4,736	2.16	+1.56
Majority		13,522	6.16	−2.19
Turnout		219,550	72.81	+13.25
BJP hold		Swing		

=== 2020 ===
2020 Bihar Legislative Assembly election: Sahebganj
Party	Candidate	Votes	%	±%
VIP	Raju Kumar Singh	81,203	44.25	
RJD	Ram Vichar Ray	65,870	35.9	−7.75
LJP	Krishan Kumar Singh	5,382	2.93	
AIMIM	Md. Moqeem	4,055	2.21	
Rashtra Sewa Dal	Sudhir Kumar	3,886	2.12	
Rashtriya Jan Jan Party	Pramod Kumar	2,851	1.55	
Rashtriya Jan Vikas Party	Umesh Kumar	2,659	1.45	
Independent	Bharat Prasad	2,419	1.32	
Hindu Samaj Party	Rajesh Kumar	2,031	1.11	
Independent	Shiv Kumar Rai	1,789	0.97	
SUCI(C)	Yadav Lal Patel	1,716	0.94	
NOTA	None of the above	1,105	0.6	−0.54
Majority		15,333	8.35	+1.76
Turnout		183,501	59.56	+1.39
VIP gain from RJD		Swing		

=== 2015 ===
2015 Bihar Legislative Assembly election: Sahebganj
Party	Candidate	Votes	%	±%
RJD	Ramvichar Rai	70,583	43.65	
BJP	Raju Kumar Singh	59,923	37.06	
Independent	Azimullah Ansari	6,716	4.15	
Independent	Madan Chaudhary	6,674	4.13	
Independent	Dilip Kumar	3,759	2.32	
SP	Basawan Prasad Bhagat	2,261	1.4	
CPI(M)	Akhileshwar Prasad Singh	2,034	1.26	
Independent	Ajay Singh	1,975	1.22	
Rashtriya Mahan Gantantra Party	Krishna Kumar Jaiswal	1,486	0.92	
NOTA	None of the above	1,849	1.14	
Majority		10,660	6.59	
Turnout		161,699	58.17	
