= Loma (Jandaha) =

Village in Bihar, India

- Village in India
- Location in Bihar, India Loma (India)
- Coordinates: 25.7377893°N 85.523023°E
- Country: India
- State: Bihar
- District: Vaishali
- District Sub-division: Mahua
- Anchal: Jandaha
- Vidhan Sabha constituency: Mahnar Vidhan Sabha
- Village: Loma

Population (2011)
  - Total: 8,124

Language
  - Official: Mother language: Hindi; Maithili
  - Additional official: Urdu
- Time zone: UTC+5:30 (IST)
- Pincode: 844505
- ISO 3166 code: IN-BR

Loma is a village in the Jandaha block of Vaishali district in the Indian state of Bihar. It is located more than 30 km from the nearest city of Hajipur.

== Demographics ==
As per the 2011 census, Loma has a total population of 8,124 people, with 1,696 households.

== Administration ==
Loma is a Gram panchayat consisting of two villages, namely Loma and Rahua. The Loma gram panchayat falls under the administrative region of Jandaha Block. There are 16 wards in the Loma gram panchayat.

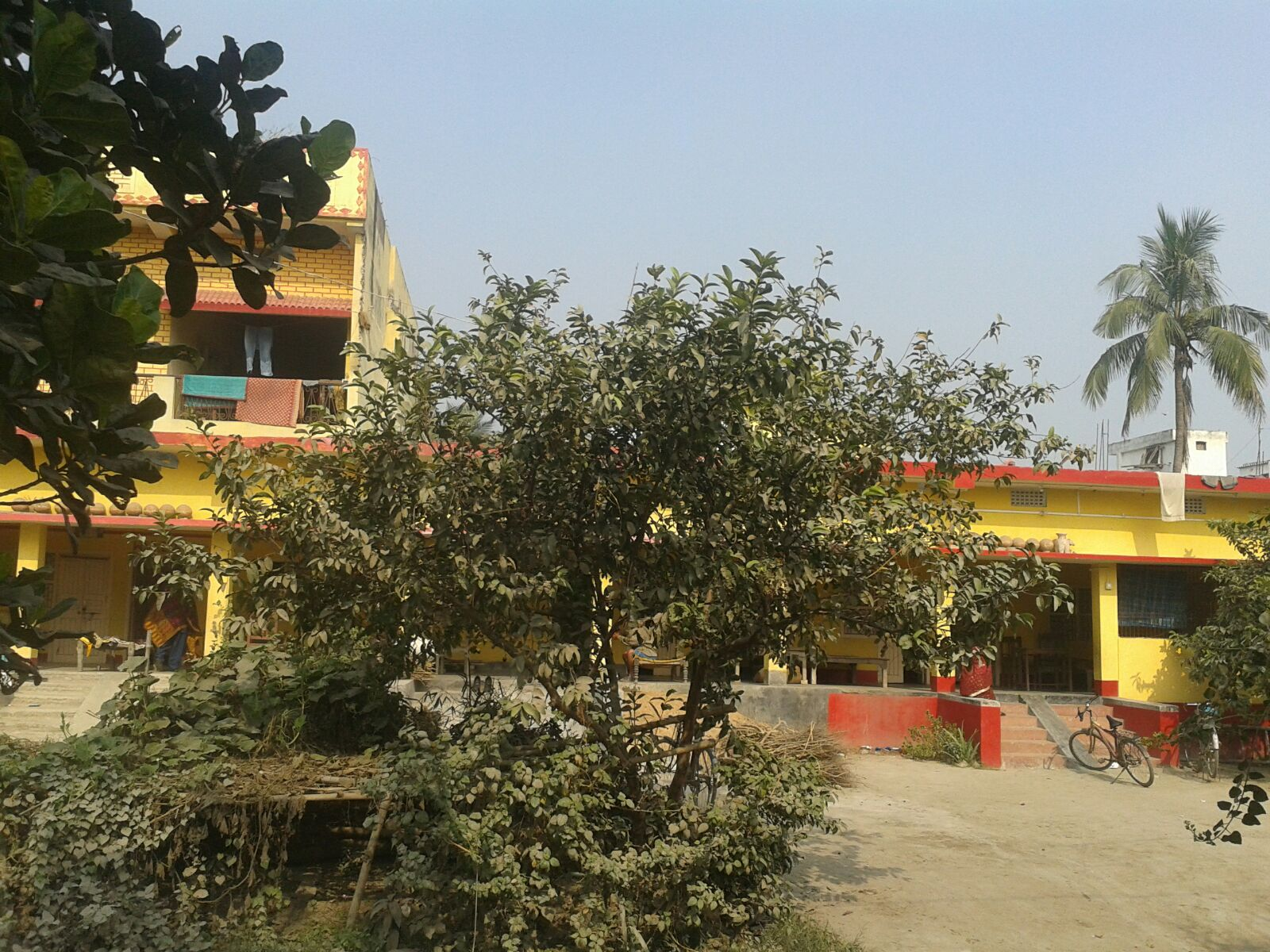
AnganWadi Kendra loma (Temporarily rented in a Chaudhary Family of the village)

== Education ==
Loma has one pre-primary school, five primary schools, and three middle schools.

== Transportation ==
- Loma is 30 km from Hajipur Junction, which is also the zonal office of the East Central Railway. Public transport is easily available from Hajipur to Loma village.
- Samstipur Railway Station is 25 km from the village; public transport or private cabs are easily available from Samstipur to Loma.
- The village is 50 km from Patna Junction railway station.
