= Tulsidas Mehta =

Indian politician

Member of Bihar Legislative Assembly
- In office 1962–1967
- Constituency: Jandaha Assembly constituency
- In office 1969–1972
- Constituency: Jandaha
- In office 1985–1990
- Constituency: Jandaha
- In office 1990–1995
- Constituency: Jandaha
- In office 1995–2000
- Constituency: Jandaha

Personal details
- Party: Janata Dal; Samyukta Socialist Party; Lok Dal
- Occupation: Politician

Tulsidas Mehta was an Indian politician, who served as Member of Bihar Legislative Assembly from Jandaha Assembly constituency. He won the 1990 Bihar Legislative Assembly election as a candidate of Janata Dal from this constituency. Mehta was a socialist politician, who also served as a minister in Government of Bihar. He is the father of another Bihar politician and former General Secretary of Rashtriya Janata Dal, Alok Kumar Mehta. He was one of the founder of Rashtriya Janata Dal. Mehta had represented Jandaha Assembly constituency multiple times, winning the Assembly elections of 1962, 1969, 1985, 1990 and 1995.

== Political career ==
Born into a Koeri family of Bihar, Mehta was a socialist politician. He was associated initially with Socialist Party, on the ticket of which, he won his first state assembly elections in 1962. In 1969, after his second electoral victory in state assembly elections, he was made a minister of state in Government of Bihar. Mehta won the Bihar Legislative Assembly elections of 1969, 1985, 1990 and 1995; he was appointed as cabinet minister in Government of Bihar for the first time in the cabinet of Karpoori Thakur in the year 1970. Mehta also served as cabinet minister twice in Lalu Prasad Yadav's cabinet. Mehta was an accomplice of socialist leader Akshayawat Rai, who motivated him to contest the 1962 Bihar Legislative Assembly elections. According to Rashtriya Janata Dal leader, Shivanand Tiwari, Mehta hesitated to contest his first election on the advice of Rai, as he was unable to bear the expenses of the election. However, when the election campaign began, he was able to defeat his political rival Rajvanshi Singh, who was supported by Indian National Congress leader Deep Narayan Singh and was a chairman of Bihar Cooperative Federation. Mehta himself admitted in front of Shivanand Tiwari that he was able to win at minimal election expenses due to support of dedicated party workers, who campaigned for him without any fee.

His son, Alok Kumar Mehta is also considered as a veteran politician of Rashtriya Janata Dal, having assumed several significant positions in the party. The Mehta family is reported to have considerable influence in the politics of Samastipur district and adjoining area.

== Other contributions ==
Mehta is also known for his work in cooperative sector. He was the founder of The Vaishali Cooperative Bank and Cooperative Cold Storage facility in state of Bihar.

== Death ==
Mehta died in 2019 at an age of ninety three. His last rites were performed at Konhara Ghat in Hajipur. This event was attended by many notable Bihar politicians like Upendra Kushwaha, Tejashwi Yadav, Ramai Ram and Jagada Nand Singh.
