= Bina Singh =

Indian politician

Member (MLA) of Bihar Legislative Assembly
- In office Nov 2020 – 2025
- Preceded by: Umesh Singh Kushwaha
- Succeeded by: Umesh Singh Kushwaha
- Constituency: Mahnar

Personal details
- Born: 1 January 1960 (age 66)
- Party: Rashtriya Janata Dal
- Spouse: Rama Kishore Singh
- Profession: Retired BSNL employee

Bina Singh is an Indian politician, currently a member of Rashtriya Janata Dal and a Member of Bihar Legislative Assembly from Mahnar. She is the wife of former Member of Parliament, Rama Kishore Singh. She defeated the Janata Dal (United) state president Umesh Singh Kushwaha in 2020 Bihar Legislative Assembly election.
