= Umesh Singh Kushwaha =

Indian politician

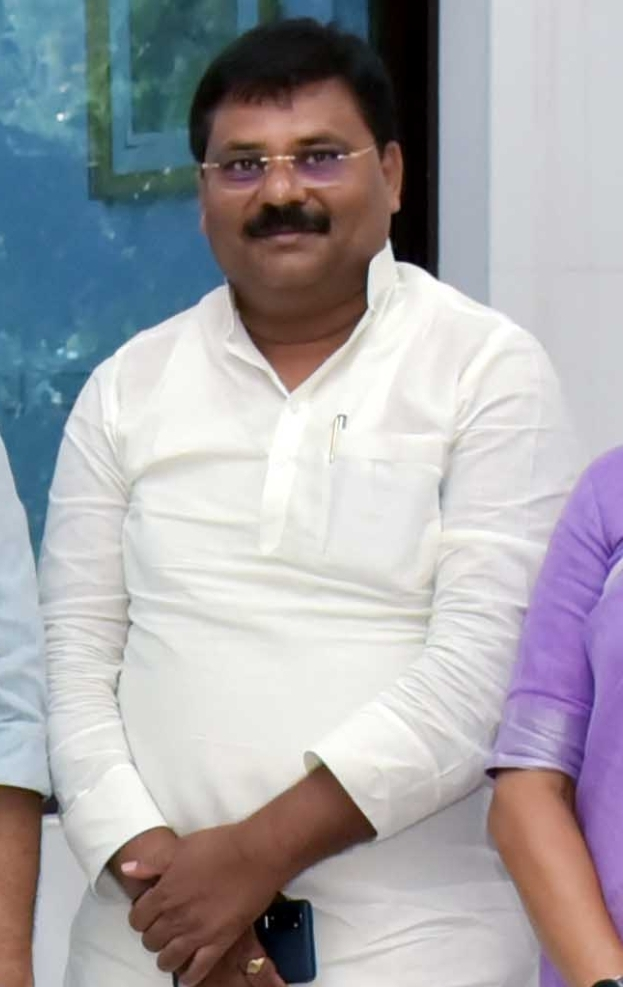

Member (MLA) of Bihar Legislative Assembly
- In office 2015–2020
- Preceded by: Achyutanand Singh
- Succeeded by: Bina Singh
- Constituency: Mahnar

Bihar state President of Janata Dal (United).
- Incumbent
- Assumed office 10 January 2021
- Preceded by: Bashistha Narain Singh

Member (MLA) of Bihar Legislative Assembly
- In office 2025–2030
- Preceded by: Bina Singh
- Constituency: Mahnar Assembly constituency

Personal details
- Born: Vaishali, Bihar, India
- Party: Janata Dal (United)
- Spouse: Renuka Kumari
- Parent: Vasudev Singh (father)

Umesh Singh Kushwaha is a Member of Legislative Assembly in Bihar from Mahnar constituency. He is a member of Janata Dal (United). Kushwaha is the son of Vasudev Singh and hails from Kajri Bujurg village in the Vaishali district of Bihar. He studied at Acharya Narendra Dev College Shahpur Patori, Lalit Narayan Mithila University. Besides being a politician he is also active in business and is a share holder in Lord Budhha food product private ltd. He is the current Bihar state President of Janata Dal (United).

== Political career ==
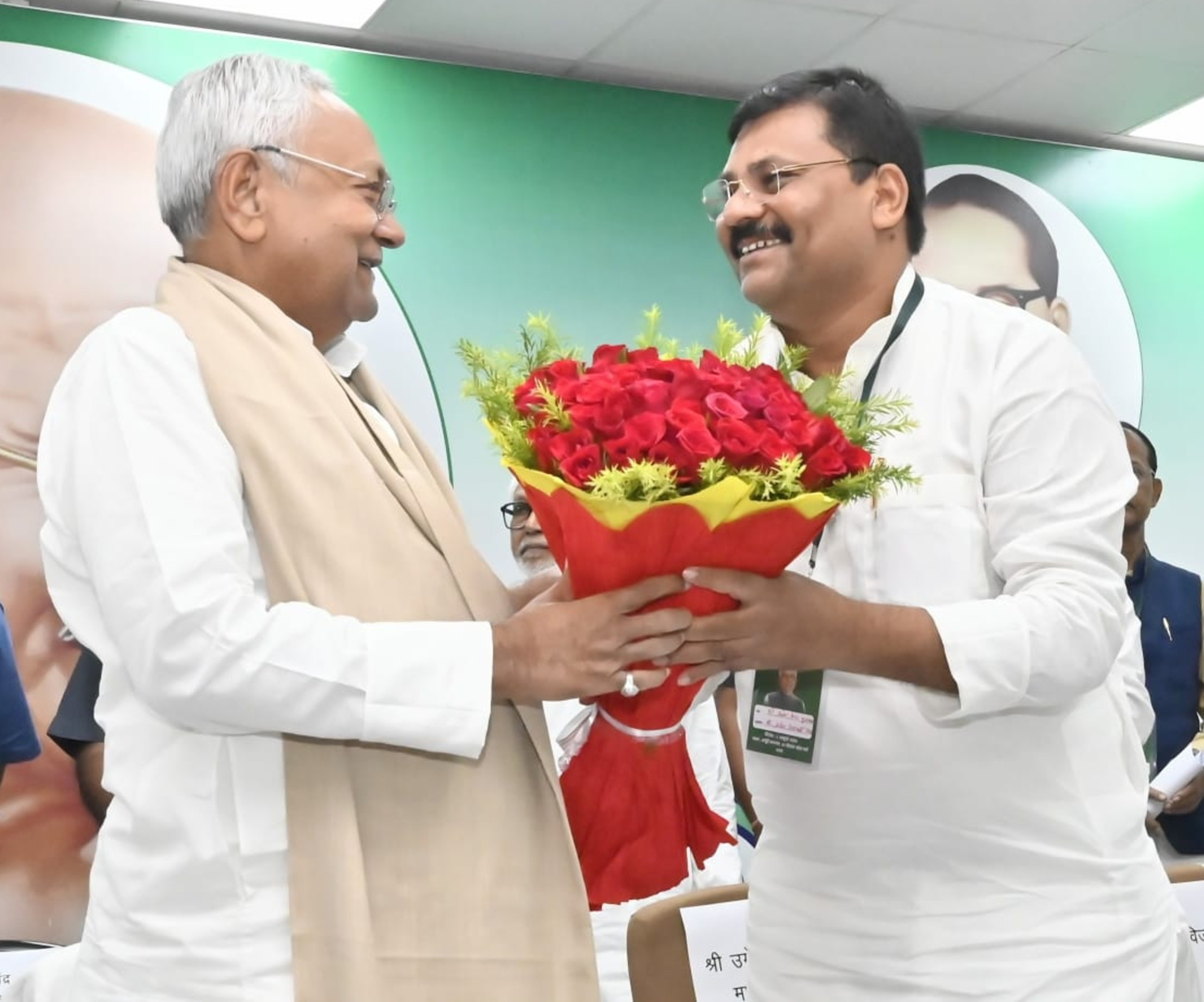
Umesh Singh Kushwaha greeting Nitish Kumar at the JDU state council meeting at Karpoori Bhawan, Patna in 2024.

Umesh Kushwaha represents the Mahnar constituency of the Bihar, which came into existence once again after the delimitation exercise of 2008. In 1957, Banarasi Devi a candidate from Indian National Congress represented this constituency but after its revival in 2008 the seat has been a stronghold of National Democratic Alliance. In 2010 Legislative Assembly Elections when Janata Dal (United) was a member of National Democratic Alliance, Dr. Achyutanand of Bharatiya Janata Party contested and won the seat but he was defeated by Kushwaha in the 2015 Elections with a large difference of 27,000 votes. Kushwaha was then a candidate of Mahagathbandhan (Grand Alliance) which included Rashtriya Janata Dal and Janata Dal (United). Later the Grand Alliance was broken due to differences between the two major political parties. In 2020 Assembly Election to Bihar Legislative Assembly JD(U) again made its candidate from the Mahnar seat.

Umesh lost the 2020 Assembly elections to Veena Devi, the wife of RJD strongman Rama Kishor Singh. The anti-incumbency situation in the state against ruling JD (U) and the step taken by Chirag Paswan to weaken JD (U) by placing its candidates against it and not against BJP resulted in defeat of a large number of sitting MLAs of JD (U).

In January 2021, Kushwaha was appointed to the post of Bihar state president of Janata Dal (United) following the resignation of Bashishtha Narayan Singh on health grounds. The party's step was reported to be a part of the strategy to revive its decaying old socio-political coalition of Koeri and Kurmi caste, which needed revival after the poor performance of JD(U) in Bihar Assembly election 2020.

In the year 2025, JDU fielded him as its candidate for the Bihar Legislative Assembly elections from Mahnar Assembly constituency. In the tough contest, he defeated Ravindra Singh of Rashtriya Janata Dal with over 38000 votes. This made him second term MLA from Mahnar Assembly constituency.

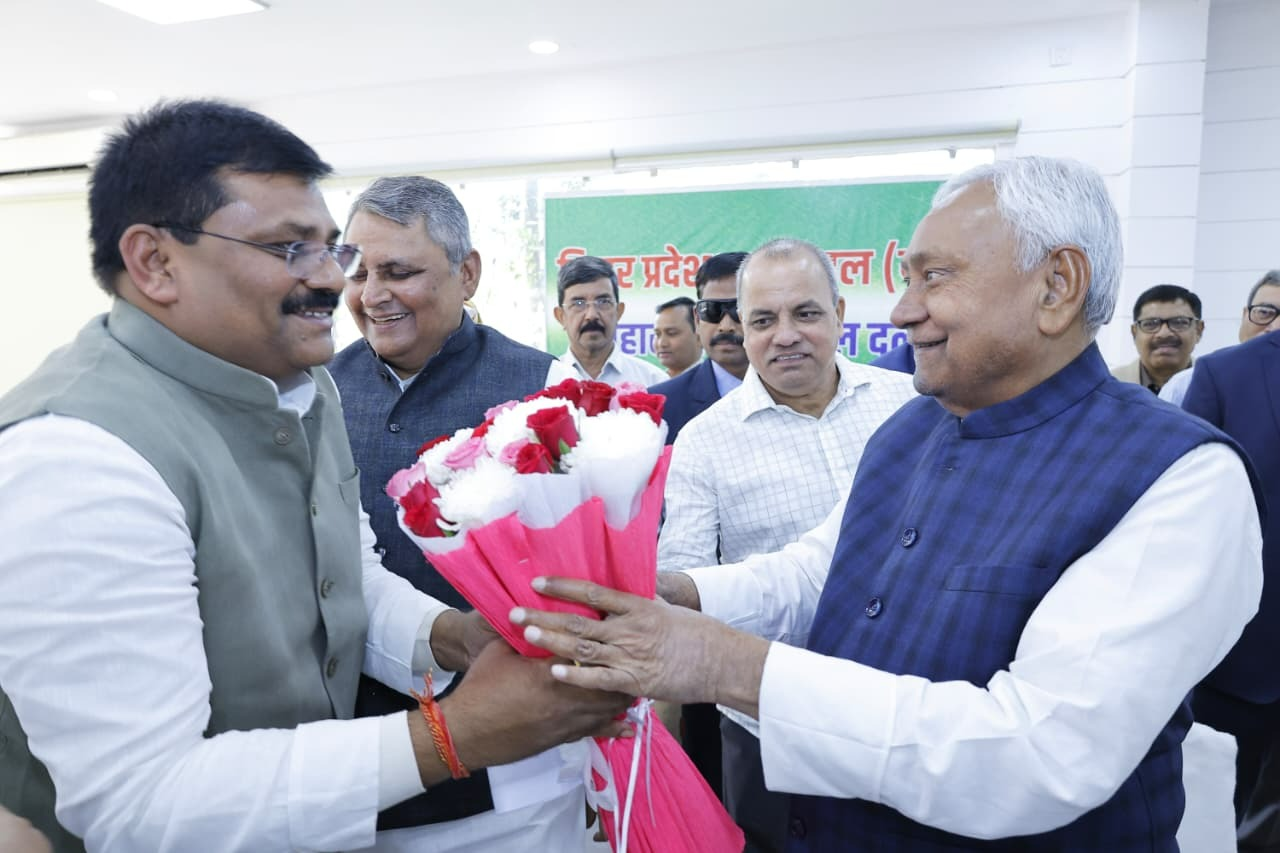
Umesh Singh Kushwaha meeting Nitish Kumar at JDU's legislature party meeting in 2025, after his electoral victory from Mahnar Assembly constituency.

== Controversies ==
Kushwaha has been involved in many controversies and has faced public criticism many a times. In one such incident, while he was to lay the foundation of a road construction project in the Baghchauna-Lavapur, a village falling within his constituency, he was hooted by the locals to the extent that he had to postpone his plan quickly. In 2018, the Block head of Rashtriya Lok Samata Party for Jandaha, Manish Sahani was gunned down by unidentified gunmen. In the First Information Report, the case was lodged against nine persons, in which Kushwaha was made the prime accused. In 2019 the a car registered under the name of Kushwaha allegedly thrashed two bikers in which both died. While the JD (U) leader claimed that it was not owned by him; the incident was followed by widespread protest by the kins of the victims near JD (U) office at Patna.
