= Komal Singh =

Indian politician

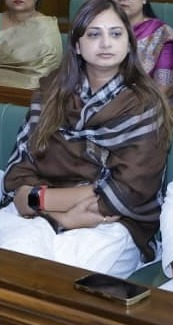

Member of the Bihar Legislative Assembly
- Incumbent
- Assumed office 14 November 2025
- Preceded by: Niranjan Roy
- Constituency: Gaighat

Personal details
- Party: Janata Dal (United)
- Profession: Politician

Komal Singh is an Indian politician and a member of Janata Dal (United) political party led by Nitish Kumar. She is a daughter of JDU's member of Bihar Legislative Council, Dinesh Prasad Singh. She was elected to Bihar Legislative Assembly from Gaighat Assembly constituency in the 2025 Bihar Legislative Assembly election.
