= Ram Vichar Ray =

Indian politician

Member of Bihar Legislative Assembly
- In office 2015–2020
- Preceded by: Raju Kumar Singh
- Succeeded by: Raju Kumar Singh
- Constituency: Sahebganj

Personal details
- Born: 2 January 1954 Madhopur Buzurg, Muzaffarpur, India
- Died: 2021 (aged 66–67)
- Party: Rashtriya Janata Dal
- Education: Matric
- Profession: Politician

Ram Vichar Ray or Ram Vichar Yadav was an Indian politician.

He served as a member of the Bihar Legislative Assembly for Sahebganj from 2015 to 2020 and 1990 to 2005 representing the Rashtriya Janata Dal.

He died in 2021 from COVID-19.
