= Ashok Kumar Singh (Paroo politician) =

Indian politician

Member of Bihar Legislative Assembly
- In office November 2005 – 14 November 2025
- Preceded by: Mithilesh Prasad Yadav
- Succeeded by: Shankar Prasad Yadav
- Constituency: Paroo

Personal details
- Born: 5 November 1967 (age 58)
- Party: Bharatiya Janata Party
- Occupation: Politician

Ashok Kumar Singh is an Indian politician from Bharatiya Janata Party, Bihar, a four term Member of Bihar Legislative Assembly, and senior leader of BJP in Bihar. He has won elections four times in a row from Paroo (Vidhan Sabha constituency).

Recently he was in the news for getting phone calls threatening his life.
