= Gaighat Assembly constituency =

Coordinates: 26°05′06″N 85°40′01″E

Gaighat
- Constituency No. 88 for the Bihar Legislative Assembly

Constituency details
- Country: India
- Region: East India
- State: Bihar
- District: Muzaffarpur
- Established: 1967
- Total electors: 322,326
- Reservation: None

Member of Legislative Assembly
- 18th Bihar Legislative Assembly
- Incumbent Komal Singh
- Party: JD(U)
- Alliance: NDA
- Elected year: 2025

Gaighat (earlier called Gaighatti) is an assembly constituency in Muzaffarpur district in the Indian state of Bihar.

== Overview ==
As per Delimitation of Parliamentary and Assembly constituencies Order, 2008, No. 88 Gaighat Assembly constituency is composed of the following: Gaighat and Bandra community development blocks; Katra, Sonpur, Berai South, Dhanaur, Madhepura and Shivdaspur gram panchayats of Katra CD Block.

Gaighat Assembly constituency is part of No. 15 Muzaffarpur (Lok Sabha constituency).

== Members of the Legislative Assembly ==
Year	Name	Party
1967	Nitishwar Prasad Singh	Indian National Congress
1969	Nitishwar Prasad Singh	Indian National Congress
1972	Nitishwar Prasad Singh	Indian National Congress
1977	Vinodanand Singh	Janata Party
1980	Jitendra Prasad Singh	Bharatiya Janata Party
1985	Virendra Kumar Singh	Indian National Congress
1990	Maheshwar Prasad Yadav	Independent politician
1995	Maheshwar Prasad Yadav	Janata Dal
2000	Virendra Kumar Singh	Janata Dal (United)
2005	Maheshwar Prasad Yadav	Rashtriya Janata Dal
2005	Maheshwar Prasad Yadav	Rashtriya Janata Dal
2010	Veena Devi	Bharatiya Janata Party
2015	Maheshwar Prasad Yadav	Rashtriya Janata Dal
2020	Niranjan Roy	Rashtriya Janata Dal
2025	Komal Singh	Janata Dal (United)

== Election results ==
=== 2025 ===
Bihar Assembly election, 2025: Gaighat
Party	Candidate	Votes	%	±%
JD(U)	Komal Singh	108,104	48.31	+19.56
RJD	Niranjan Roy	84,687	37.84	+4.92
JSP	Ashok Kumar Singh	10,790	4.82	
Independent	Subodh Kumar Singh	6,157	2.75	
Independent	Mithilesh Manjhi	3,264	1.46	
Jan Sahmati Party	Kunal Kumar	2,969	1.33	
BSP	Ishrat Perween	2,794	1.25	
NOTA	None of the above	3,788	1.69	+0.44
Majority		23,417	10.47	+6.3
Turnout		223,779	69.43	+11.98
JD(U) gain from RJD		Swing		

=== 2020 ===
2020 Bihar Legislative Assembly election: Gaighat
Party	Candidate	Votes	%	±%
RJD	Niranjan Roy	59,778	32.92	−7.88
JD(U)	Maheshwar Pd Yadav	52,212	28.75	
LJP	komal singh	36,851	20.29	
Independent	Ganesh Jha	3,142	1.73	
JP	Sudhir Kumar Jha	3,019	1.66	
Independent	Subhash Chaudhary	2,606	1.43	
Aam Janmat Party	Vipalav Kumar Paswan	2,466	1.36	
The Plurals Party	Subodh Kumar Singh	2,260	1.24	
Independent	Suresh Sahani	2,065	1.14	
AIFB	Shubhankar Kumar Singh	2,015	1.11	+0.73
NOTA	None of the above	2,277	1.25	+0.6
Majority		7,566	4.17	+2.05
Turnout		181,613	57.45	+0.05
RJD hold		Swing		

=== 2015 ===
Bihar Assembly election, 2020: Gaighat
Party	Candidate	Votes	%	±%
RJD	Maheshwar prasad yadav	67,313	40.8	
BJP	Veena Devi	63,812	38.68	
Independent	Ashok Kumar Singh	7,826	4.74	
Janta Dal Rashtravadi	Vishal Kumar	2,822	1.71	
Sarvajan Kalyan Loktantrik Party	Vakil Sahani	2,421	1.47	
BSP	Abdul- Wahab	2,324	1.41	
Independent	Rani Singh	2,262	1.37	
Independent	Md. Najul Ansari	2,112	1.28	
Independent	Raghunandan Pd Singh	1,885	1.14	
CPI(ML)L	Jitendra Yadav	1,698	1.03	
NOTA	None of the above	1,070	0.65	
Majority		3,501	2.12	
Turnout		164,965	57.4	
RJD hold		Swing		
