= Mahnar Assembly constituency =

Mahnar
- Constituency No. 129 for the Bihar Legislative Assembly

Constituency details
- Country: India
- Region: East India
- State: Bihar
- District: Vaishali
- Lok Sabha constituency: 21. Hajipur (SC)
- Established: 1957
- Total electors: 301,439

Member of Legislative Assembly
- 18th Bihar Legislative Assembly
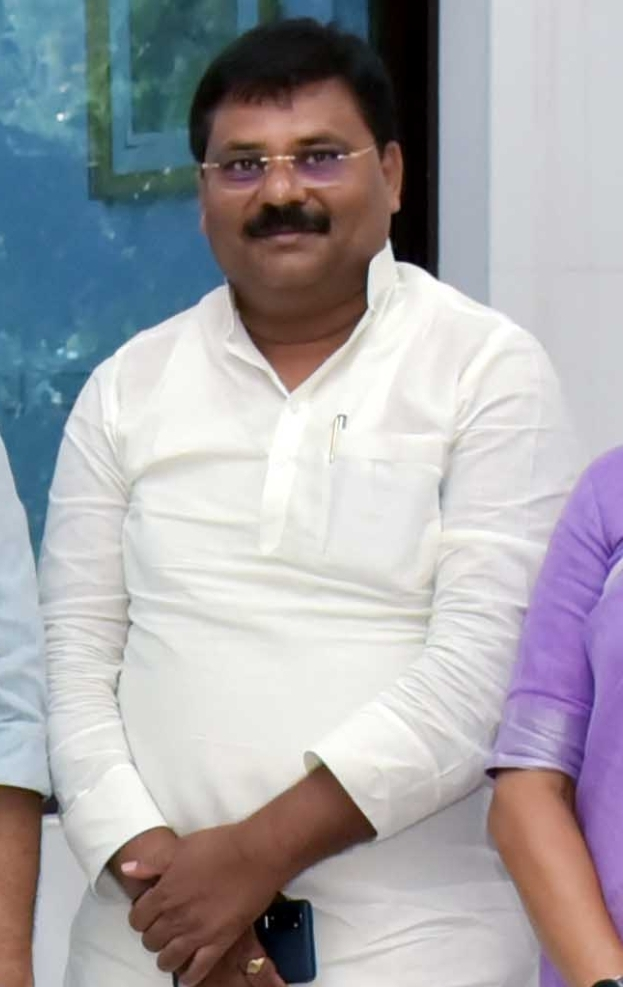
- Incumbent Umesh Singh Kushwaha
- Party: JD(U)
- Alliance: NDA
- Elected year: 2025

Mahnar is an assembly constituency in Vaishali district in the Indian state of Bihar.

== Overview ==
As per Delimitation of Parliamentary and Assembly constituencies Order, 2008, No. 129 Mahnar Assembly constituency is composed of the following: Mahnar community development block; Borhan urf Rasulpur Gaus, Basantpur, Mohiuddinpur Garahi, Harprasad, Mahipura, Sohrathi, Mahisaur, Chandsarai, Dihbuchauli, Peerapur, Rasalpur Purushottam, Bishunpur Bedauliya, Saiyad Mahammad urf Salha, Khopi, Arniyan, Hazrat Jandaha, Bahsi Saidpur, Mukundpur Bhath and Loma gram panchayats of Jandaha community development block.

Mahnar Assembly constituency is part of No. 21 Hajipur (Lok Sabha constituency) (SC).

== Members of the Legislative Assembly ==
Year	Member	Party
1952	Deep Narayan Singh	Indian National Congress
1957	Banarsi Devi	Indian National Congress
1962	Muneshwar Prasad Singh	Praja Socialist Party
1967	Muneshwar Prasad Singh	Samyukta Socialist Party
1969	Muneshwar Prasad Singh	Samyukta Socialist Party
1972	Muneshwar Prasad Singh	Socialist Party
1977	Muneshwar Prasad Singh	Janata Party
1980	Munshilal Rai	Janata Party
1985	Munshilal Rai	Lok Dal
1990	Muneshwar Prasad Singh	Socialist Party-Lohia
1995	Munshilal Rai	Janata Dal
2000	Rama Kishore Singh	Janata Dal (United)
2005	Rama Kishore Singh	Lok Janshakti Party
2005	Rama Kishore Singh	Lok Janshakti Party
2010	Achyutanand Singh	Bharatiya Janata Party
2015	Umesh Kushwaha	Janata Dal (United)
2020	Bina Singh	Rashtriya Janata Dal
2025	Umesh Kushwaha	Janata Dal (United)

== Election results ==
=== 2025 ===
Bihar Legislative Assembly Election, 2025: Mahnar
Party	Candidate	Votes	%	±%
JD(U)	Umesh Singh Kushwaha	98,050	48.59	+16.05
RJD	Ravindra Kumar Singh	59,492	29.48	−7.86
Independent	Sanjay Kumar Ray	14,153	7.01	
Independent	Vipin Kumar	7,657	3.79	
JSP	Dr. Rajesh Kumar	4,512	2.24	
RLJP	Achutanand	2,554	1.27	
Independent	Subodh Singh	2,029	1.01	
Independent	Ramesh Sahni	1,974	0.98	
NOTA	None of the above	1,321	0.65	−2.06
Majority		38,558	19.11	+14.31
Turnout		201,787	66.94	+12.56
JD(U) gain from RJD		Swing		

=== 2020 ===
In 2015 Janata Dal (United) deflected from the National Democratic Alliance and allied with its chief rival Rashtriya Janata Dal to form a coalition called Mahagathbandhan. In the elections to Mahnar constituency in 2015 Umesh Kushwaha of JD (U) defeated Achyutanand Singh with a large margin of 27000 votes. However, in 2020 Umesh Kushwaha lost to Bina Singh, the wife of Rama Kishore Singh who contested the 2020 election on Rashtriya Janata Dal symbol.

2020 Bihar Legislative Assembly election: Mahnar
Party	Candidate	Votes	%	±%
RJD	Bina Singh	61,721	37.34	
JD(U)	Umesh Singh Kushwaha	53,774	32.54	▼14.58
LJP	Rabindra Kr. Singh	31,315	18.95	
RLSP	Triveni Kumar Choudhary	2,547	1.54	
Sathi Aur Aapka Faisala Party	Shyam Babu Singh	1,960	1.19	
Janshakti Vikas Party (Democratic)	Hareram Kumar	1,840	1.11	
JAP(L)	Raghupati Singh	1,507	0.91	▼2.75
NOTA	None of the above	4,481	2.71	▲1.66
Majority		7,947	4.8	▼13.05
Turnout		165,274	54.38	▲0.09
RJD gain from JD(U)		Swing		

=== 2015 ===
2015 Bihar Legislative Assembly election: Mahnar
Party	Candidate	Votes	%	±%
JD(U)	Umesh Singh Kushwaha	69,825	47.12	
BJP	Dr. Achuta Nand	43,370	29.27	
JAP(L)	Amod Kumar Ray	5,425	3.66	
Independent	Rabindra Kumar Singh	2,881	1.94	
BSP	Braj Nandan Kumar Singh	2,777	1.87	
Rastriya Sadabahar Party	Ram Sagar Hajra	2,733	1.84	
LKD	Sanjit Thakur	2,601	1.76	
Independent	Arjun Das	2,307	1.56	
Independent	Annpurna Singh	1,993	1.34	
Sarvajan Kalyan Loktantrik Party	Kundan Kumar	1,598	1.08	
Independent	Mahesh Paswan	1,546	1.04	
NOTA	None of the above	1,561	1.05	
Majority		26,455	17.85	
Turnout		148,186	54.29	

=== 2010 ===
In the 2010 state assembly elections, Dr. Achyutanand Singh of BJP won the Mahnar assembly seat defeating Rama Kishore Singh of LJP. Contests in most years were multi cornered but only winners and runners up are being mentioned. Rama Kishore Singh of LJP defeated Munshilal Rai of RJD in October 2005 and February 2005. Rama Kishore Singh of JD(U) defeated Munshilal Rai of RJD in 2000. Munshilal Rai of JD defeated Rama Kishore Singh, Independent, in 1995. Muneshwar Prasad Singh of SOP(L) defeated Raghupati of JD in 1990. Munshilal Rai of LD defeated Mithleshwar Prasad of Congress in 1985. Munshilal Rai of Janata Party (Secular – Charan Singh) defeated Ram Prasad Singh of Congress in 1980. Muneshwar Prasad Singh of JP defeated Akhilesh Kumar Ray of Congress in 1977.
