= Sarmastpur =

- village
- Country: India
- State: Bihar

Languages
  - Official: Maithili, Hindi
- Time zone: UTC+5:30 (IST)
- ISO 3166 code: IN-BR

Sarmastpur, also known as Shrawastipuram, is a village located in Muzaffarpur District, Bihar state, India. The village has a population of around 11,098 as of 2011.

== Location ==
It is near to the Gandak river which flows west to east in the vicinity of the village. The village is administered by Geyaspur panchayat, Paroo block and is about 45 km east of Muzaffarpur town. The village has many castes - Rajputs, Yadav, Harijans, Paswans, Barbers, etc. but is dominated by Rajput caste.

== Education ==
There is a primary school, high school and intermediate college. Students from other local villages come for education to this village. As of the 2011 Census, the literacy rate is 72.38% (men: 81.07%; women: 62.90%), higher than the Bihar statewide rate of 72.38%.

== Temples ==
Four temples are situated near the high school. There is a Sun Temple in the center of the pond.
