= Vaishali Lok Sabha constituency =

Constituency of the Indian parliament in Bihar

Coordinates: 26.00°N 85.08°E

Vaishali
- Lok Sabha constituency

Constituency details
- Country: India
- Region: East India
- State: Bihar
- Assembly constituencies: Minapur; Kanti; Baruraj; Paroo; Sahebganj; Vaishali
- Established: 1977
- Reservation: None

Member of Parliament
- 18th Lok Sabha
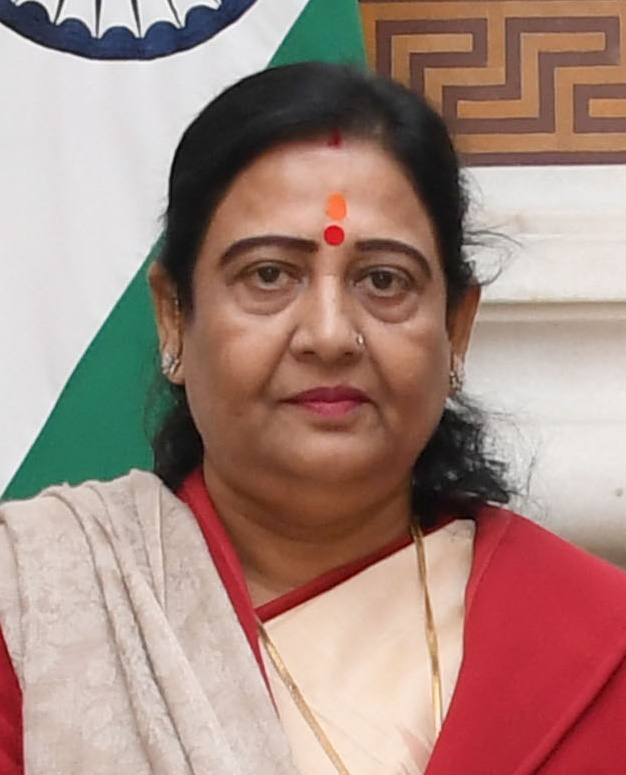
- Incumbent Veena Devi
- Party: LJP(RV)
- Alliance: NDA
- Elected year: 2024
- Preceded by: Rama Kishore Singh

Vaishali is one of the 40 Lok Sabha constituencies in Bihar state in eastern India.

== Assembly segments ==
Vaishali Lok Sabha constituency comprises the following six Vidhan Sabha (legislative assembly) segments:

#	Name	District	Member	Party	2024 lead
90	Minapur	Muzaffarpur	Ajay Kushwaha	JD(U)	LJP(RV)
95	Kanti	Muzaffarpur	Ajit Singh	JD(U)	LJP(RV)
96	Baruraj	Muzaffarpur	Arun Kumar Singh	BJP	LJP(RV)
97	Paroo	Muzaffarpur	Shankar Yadav	RJD	LJP(RV)
98	Sahebganj	Muzaffarpur	Raju Kumar Singh	BJP	LJP(RV)
125	Vaishali	Vaishali	Siddharth Patel	JD(U)	LJP(RV)

== Members of Parliament ==
Year	Name	Party
1952-77 : Seat did not exist
1977	Digvijay Narain Singh	Janata Party
1980	Kishori Sinha	Janata Party
1984	Kishori Sinha	Indian National Congress
1989	Usha Sinha	Janata Dal
1991	Shiva Saran Singh	Janata Dal
1994^	Lovely Anand	Bihar People's Party
1996	Raghuvansh Prasad Singh	Janata Dal
1998	Raghuvansh Prasad Singh	Rashtriya Janata Dal
1999	Raghuvansh Prasad Singh	Rashtriya Janata Dal
2004	Raghuvansh Prasad Singh	Rashtriya Janata Dal
2009	Raghuvansh Prasad Singh	Rashtriya Janata Dal
2014	Rama Kishore Singh	Lok Janshakti Party
2019	Veena Devi	Lok Janshakti Party
2024	Veena Devi	Lok Janshakti Party (Ram Vilas)

^ by-poll

== Election results ==
=== 2024 ===
2024 Indian General Election: Vaishali
Party	Candidate	Votes	%	±%
LJP(RV)	Veena Devi	567,043	48.38	
RJD	Munna Shukla	4,77,409	40.37	
Independent	Vikky kumar	34,256	2.92	
BSP	Shambhu Kumar Singh	21,436	1.83	
NOTA	None of the above	27,460	2.34	
Margin of victory		89,634		
Turnout		11,72,436	62.63	
LJP(RV) gain from LJP		Swing		

=== 2019 ===
2019 Indian general elections: Vaishali
Party	Candidate	Votes	%	±%
LJP	Veena Devi	568,215	52.87	
RJD	Raghuvansh Prasad Singh	3,33,631	31.04	
IND.	Abha Rai	27,497	2.56	
IND.	Ismohamad Alias Md. Munna	21,857	2.01	
IND.	Rinkoo Devi	16,738	1.56	
Margin of victory		2,34,584	21.83	+11.00
Turnout		10,74,751	61.91	
LJP hold		Swing	+19.88	

=== 2014 ===
2014 Indian general elections: Vaishali
Party	Candidate	Votes	%	±%
LJP	Rama Kishore Singh	3,05,450	32.99	
RJD	Raghuvansh Prasad Singh	2,06,183	22.17	
JD(U)	Vijay Kumar Sahni	1,44,807	15.71	
Independent	Anu Shukla	1,04,229	11.26	
AAP	Raaj Mangal Prasad	7,768	0.84	
NOTA	None of the Above	6,060	0.65	
Majority		99,267	10.82	
Turnout		9,25,951	59.12	
Swing to LJP from RJD		Swing		

=== 2009 ===
2009 Indian general elections: Vaishali
Party	Candidate	Votes	%	±%
RJD	Raghuvansh Prasad Singh	2,83,454	45.53	
JD(U)	Vijay Kumar Shukla	2,62,049	41.96	
BSP	Sankar Mahto	17,448	2.79	
INLD	Jitendra Prasad	16,057	2.57	
INC	Hind Kesari Yadav	11,925	1.91	
Majority		21,405	3.57	
Turnout		6,24,859	48.86	
RJD hold		Swing		

=== 2004 ===
2004 Indian general election: Vaishali
Party	Candidate	Votes	%	±%
RJD	Raghubansh Prasad Singh	361,503	48.28	
Independent	Vijay Kumar Shukla	255,568	34.13	
JD(U)	Dr. Harendra Kumar	73,287	9.79	
BSP	Jitender Kumar Singh	14,474	1.93	
SP	Nitya Nand Singh	3,925	0.52	
AD	Upendra Pd. Singh	2,832	0.38	
JD(S)	Jainendra Kumar	1,238	0.17	
Independent	9 Independent Candidates	35,932	4.80	
Majority		105,935	14.15	
Turnout				
RJD hold		Swing		

=== 1999 ===
1999 Indian general election: Vaishali
Party	Candidate	Votes	%	±%
RJD	Raghuvansh Prasad Singh	308,458	43.46	
BPP	Lovely Anand	263,066	37.06	
Independent	Shashi Kumar Rai	112,450	15.84	
Independent	Mohammad Umar Ansari	7,566	1.07	
Independent	Yogendra Ram	6,952	0.98	
Independent	Maheshwar Paswan	4,966	0.70	
NCP	Shambhu Sharan Thakur	2,261	0.32	
AJBP	Prabhat Kiran	2,092	0.29	
Independent	Upendra Choudhary	1,248	0.18	
Independent	Ramekbal Ram	693	0.10	
Majority		45,392	6.40	
Turnout		721,601	68.79	
RJD hold		Swing		

=== 1998 ===
1998 Indian general election: Vaishali
Party	Candidate	Votes	%	±%
RJD	Raghuvansh Prasad Singh	322,101	43.97	
SAP	Brishim Patel	280,607	38.31	
JD	Shashi Kumar Rai	111,067	15.16	
BJC	Bharat Pd. Singh	6,600	0.90	
Independent	Lakhichandra Ray	5,982	0.82	
Independent	Badri Ram	1,477	0.20	
SP	Shashi Bhushan Singh	1,448	0.20	
Independent	Vasudeo Ram	1,070	0.15	
Independent	Jagdeo Paswan	982	0.13	
Independent	Sukhdeo Kesari	681	0.09	
Independent	Umashanker Paswan	528	0.07	
Majority		41,494	5.66	
Turnout		742,358	70.71	
Swing to RJD from JD		Swing		

=== 1996 ===
1996 Indian general election: Vaishali
Party	Candidate	Votes	%	±%
JD	Raghuvansh Prasad Singh	354,226	50.33	
SAP	Vrishin Patel	291,543	41.42	
INC	Raghunath Pandey	39,170	5.57	
AIIC(T)	Aliraza Ansari	836	0.12	
Independent	52 Independent Candidates	18,088	2.56	
Majority		62,683	8.91	
Turnout				
JD hold		Swing		

=== 1991 ===
1991 Indian general election: Vaishali
Party	Candidate	Votes	%	±%
JD	Sheo Sharan Singh	346,003	54.72	▼8.12
INC	Usha Singh	236,160	37.35	▲4.85
BJP	Shyam Narain Thakur	16,503	2.61	New entry
JP	Valendra Pd. Singh	13,306	2.10	New entry
Independent	29 Independent Candidates	19,134	3.04	Steady
Others	4 Other Party Candidates	1,156	0.19	Steady
Majority		109,843	17.37	▼12.97
Turnout				
JD hold		Swing		

=== 1989 ===
1989 Indian general election: Vaishali
Party	Candidate	Votes	%	±%
JD	Usha Singh	441,514	62.84	New entry
INC	Kishori Sinha	228,297	32.50	▼14.97
Independent	19 Independent Candidates	29,106	4.15	Steady
Others	2 Other Party Candidates	3,640	0.52	Steady
Majority		213,217	30.34	▲26.80
Turnout				
Swing to JD from INC		Swing		

=== 1984 ===
1984 Indian general election: Vaishali
Party	Candidate	Votes	%	±%
INC	Kishori Sinha	267,546	47.47	▲33.76
LKD	Tarkeshwari Sinha	247,593	43.93	New entry
Independent	Baleshwar Rusul Puri	14,942	2.65	Steady
Independent	Rita Bahi	11,265	2.00	Steady
JP	Shyam Nandan Mishra	6,496	1.15	▼83.88
Independents	9 Independent Candidates	15,775	2.79	Steady
Majority		19,953	3.54	▼67.78
Turnout				
Swing to INC from JP		Swing		

=== 1977 ===
1977 Indian general election: Vaishali
Party	Candidate	Votes	%	±%
JP	Digvijoy Narain Singh	435,757	85.03	New entry
INC	Nawal Kishore Singh	70,260	13.71	New entry
Independent	Nafrullah	2,435	0.48	Steady
Independent	Gopal Paswan	2,290	0.45	Steady
Independent	Ram Janam Rai	1,748	0.34	Steady
Majority		365,497	71.32	New entry
Turnout		516,082	76.10	New entry
JP win (new seat)				

== See also ==
- Muzaffarpur district
- List of constituencies of the Lok Sabha
