= Hazrat Jandaha =

Jandaha
- Town
- Location in Bihar, India
- Coordinates: 25°43′0″N 85°32′0″E
- Country: India
- State: Bihar
- District: Vaishali
- Elevation: 43 m (141 ft)

Languages
  - Official: Maithili, Hindi, Bajjika
- Time zone: UTC+5:30 (IST)
- PIN: 844505
- Telephone code: 06227
- Nearest city: Hajipur

Hazrat Jandaha, also commonly called Jandaha, is a town in the Vaishali district of the Indian state of Bihar .

== History ==
It took its name from Hazrat Makhdoom Shah Abul Fateh revered as Hazrat Diwan Ali Shah, a Sufi saint who flourished Sufism and its teachings all around Hajipur and is buried at Tangoal. He named the river Biah (come) and the town Hazrat Jandaha (don't drown).

== Location ==
Located close to National Highway 322, the town is situated near the border of Samastipur District and is approximately 30 km to the east of Hajipur.

== Transport ==
Rail link

Nearest Railway stations:

- Hajipur - 30 km
- Patori
- Muzaffarpur
- Samastipur

Airport

Patna Airport - 55 km.

Roads

Jandaha is connected to other parts of India through national and state highways. The major highways are:

- National Highway 322 (NH 322) which starts from Hajipur and joins NH 28A at Musri Gharari (Samastipur).
