= Jandaha Assembly constituency =

Coordinates: 25°42′58″N 85°31′58″E

Jandaha
- Former constituency for the Bihar Legislative Assembly

Constituency details
- Country: India
- Region: East India
- State: Bihar
- District: Vaishali
- Lok Sabha constituency: Hajipur
- Established: 1962
- Abolished: 2010

Jandaha Assembly constituency was an assembly constituency in Vaishali district in the Indian state of Bihar.

== Overview ==
As a consequence of the orders of the Delimitation Commission of India, Jandaha Assembly constituency emerged in 1962 and ceased to exist in 2010.

It was part of Hajipur Lok Sabha constituency.

== Members of Vidhan Sabha ==
Year	Member	Party
1962	Tulsidas Mehta	Socialist Party
1967	Bhuvneshwar Chaudhary	Indian National Congress
1969	Tulsidas Mehta	Samyukta Socialist Party
1972	Bhagdeo Singh	Independent
1977	Munshi Lal Ray	Janata Party
1980	Birendra Singh	Independent
1985	Tulsidas Mehta	Lokdal
1990	Tulsidas Mehta	Janata Dal
1995	Tulsidas Mehta	Janata Dal
2000	Upendra Kushwaha	Samata Party
2005	Achyutanand Singh	Lok Janshakti Party
2005	Achyutanand Singh	Lok Janshakti Party
2010 onwards: Constituency does not exist
