= Niranjan Roy =

Indian politician

Niranjan Roy is an Indian politician. He is a member of Rashtriya Janata Dal and a Member of the Bihar Legislative Assembly from Gaighat constituency.
