= Raju Kumar Singh =

Indian politician

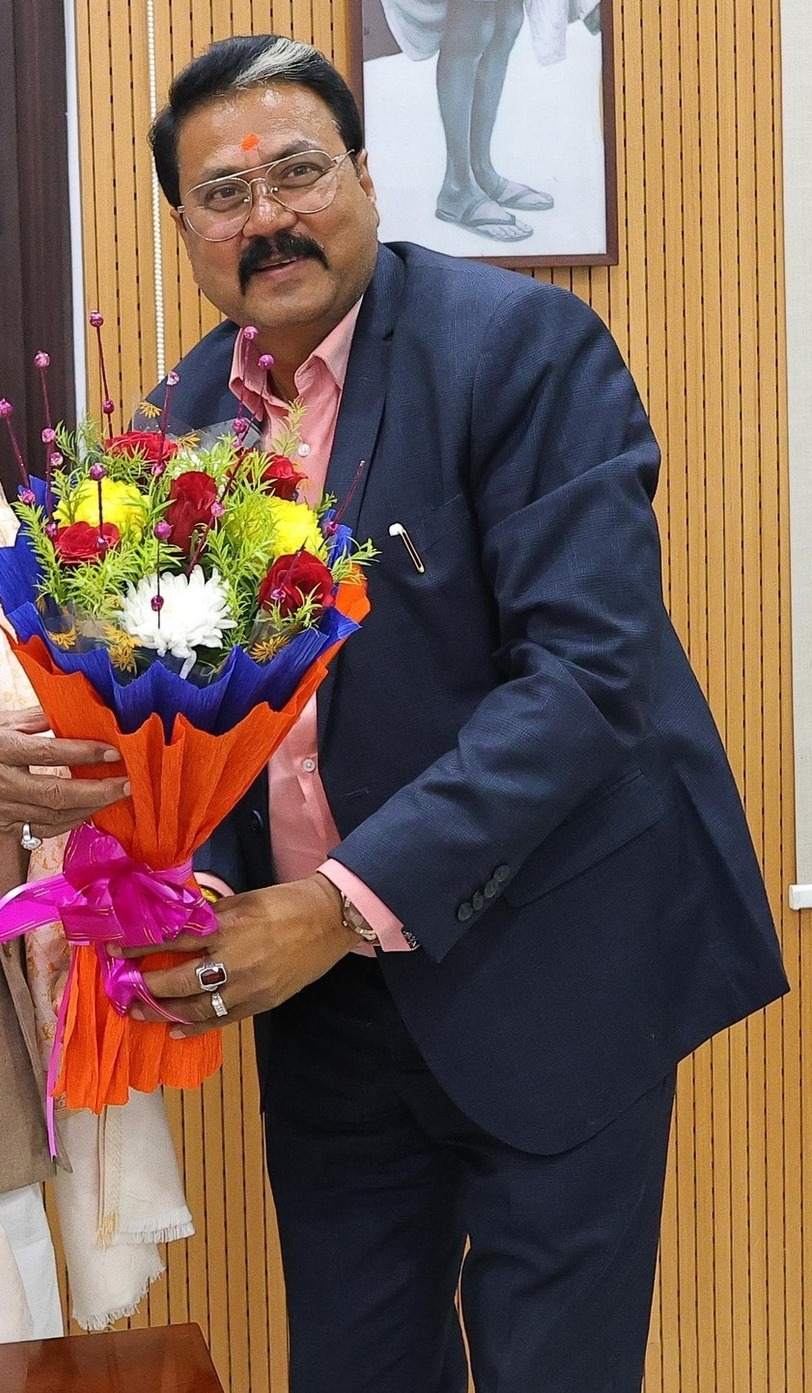

Member of the Bihar Legislative Assembly
- Incumbent
- Assumed office 2020
- Preceded by: Ram Vichar Ray
- Constituency: Sahebganj

Minister of Tourism, Government of Bihar
- In office February 2025 – July 2026
- Premier: Nitish Kumar
- Governor: Rajendra Arlekar

Member of the Bihar Legislative Assembly
- In office 2005–2015
- Preceded by: Ram Vichar Ray
- Succeeded by: Ram Vichar Ray
- Constituency: Sahebganj

Personal details
- Born: Muzaffarpur, Bihar, India
- Party: Bharatiya Janata Party (2022–present); Vikassheel Insaan Party (2020–2022); Janata Dal (United) (2009–2015); Lok Janshakti Party (2005–2009)
- Spouse: Renu Singh

Raju Kumar Singh (born c. 1974) is an Indian politician from Bihar who serves as a member of the Bihar Legislative Assembly, representing the Sahebganj Assembly constituency. Initially elected in 2005, he has served multiple terms representing the constituency, and has been affiliated with the Lok Janshakti Party, Janata Dal (United), Vikassheel Insaan Party, and the Bharatiya Janata Party. He briefly served as the Minister of Tourism in the Government of Bihar in 2025.

In June 2026, Singh was convicted in connection with a 2018 celebratory firing incident that resulted in the death of a woman, and was sentenced to four years of imprisonment in July 2026, putting his legislative seat at risk of disqualification under the Representation of the People Act, 1951.

== Political career ==
Singh began his political career with the Lok Janshakti Party (LJP), contesting and winning the Sahebganj Assembly constituency in the February 2005 Bihar Legislative Assembly elections. He successfully retained the seat in the subsequent October 2005 elections.

In 2009, Singh joined the Janata Dal (United) (JD(U)) and won the seat in the 2010 elections. During his tenure with JD(U), he was disqualified from the Bihar Legislative Assembly in 2014 by the Speaker, along with three other MLAs, for anti-party activities and cross-voting during Rajya Sabha by-elections.

Singh joined the Bharatiya Janata Party (BJP) ahead of the 2015 elections, but lost the Sahebganj seat to Ram Vichar Ray of the Rashtriya Janata Dal (RJD).

In the 2020 elections, he joined the Vikassheel Insaan Party (VIP) and successfully re-won the Sahebganj seat. In March 2022, Singh and two other VIP MLAs joined the BJP, leaving the VIP with no representation in the state assembly. He successfully contested and won the 2025 elections as a BJP candidate. In February 2025, he was appointed Minister of Tourism in the cabinet led by Chief Minister Nitish Kumar.

== Legal issues ==
According to his election affidavits, Singh has faced multiple criminal cases, including charges under the Arms Act, and allegations of kidnapping and murder.

=== 2018 celebratory firing case and conviction ===
On the night of 31 December 2018, during a New Year's Eve party held at Singh's farmhouse in Fatehpur Beri, South Delhi, a celebratory firing incident took place. A bullet fired during the event struck a 45-year-old female guest, architect Dr. Archana Gupta, who succumbed to her injuries at a hospital on 3 January 2019.

Following the incident, Singh fled the scene but was later arrested in Gorakhpur, Uttar Pradesh. A case was registered, originally under charges of murder, which were subsequently amended during trial.

On 6 June 2026, the Rouse Avenue Court in Delhi convicted Singh under Section 304 Part II (culpable homicide not amounting to murder with the knowledge that the act is likely to cause death, but without intent) of the Indian Penal Code, and Section 30 of the Arms Act for violating the conditions of his arms license. Singh's wife, Renu Singh, and two others were acquitted of charges related to the destruction of evidence due to a lack of material proof.

On 4 July 2026, Special Judge Vishal Gogne sentenced Singh to four years of simple imprisonment for the culpable homicide charge and two months under the Arms Act, to run concurrently. The court also imposed a fine of ₹ 25 lakh, to be paid to the victim's husband as compensation. During the sentencing, the judge condemned the culture of celebratory firing, stating that "gun culture" is antithetical to a society governed by the rule of law.

Following the sentencing, Singh moved the Delhi High Court. On 27 July 2026, the High Court suspended his sentence and granted him bail pending appeal, noting the likelihood of delay in hearing the appeal, though the conviction itself was not stayed. Under Section 8(3) of the Representation of the People Act, 1951, the four-year conviction places Singh's membership in the Bihar Legislative Assembly at risk of automatic disqualification.
