= Daudpur =

- Town
- Location of Daudpur Bihar, India
- Coordinates: 25.905919°N 84.593987°E
- Country: India
- State: Bihar
- District: Saran
- Legislative Constituency: 114, Manjhi
- Parliamentary constituency: 19, Maharajganj
- Elevation: 60 m (200 ft)
- Time zone: UTC+5:30 (IST)
- Pincode(s): 841205
- Area code(s): +91-6155

Daudpur is a market town in the Saran district of Bihar located on NH-85 (Chapra Siwan Gopalganj Highway), 13 miles (21 km) West of Chhapra, connected by railways (station code DDP).
