= Raghuvansh Prasad Singh =

Indian politician (1946–2020)

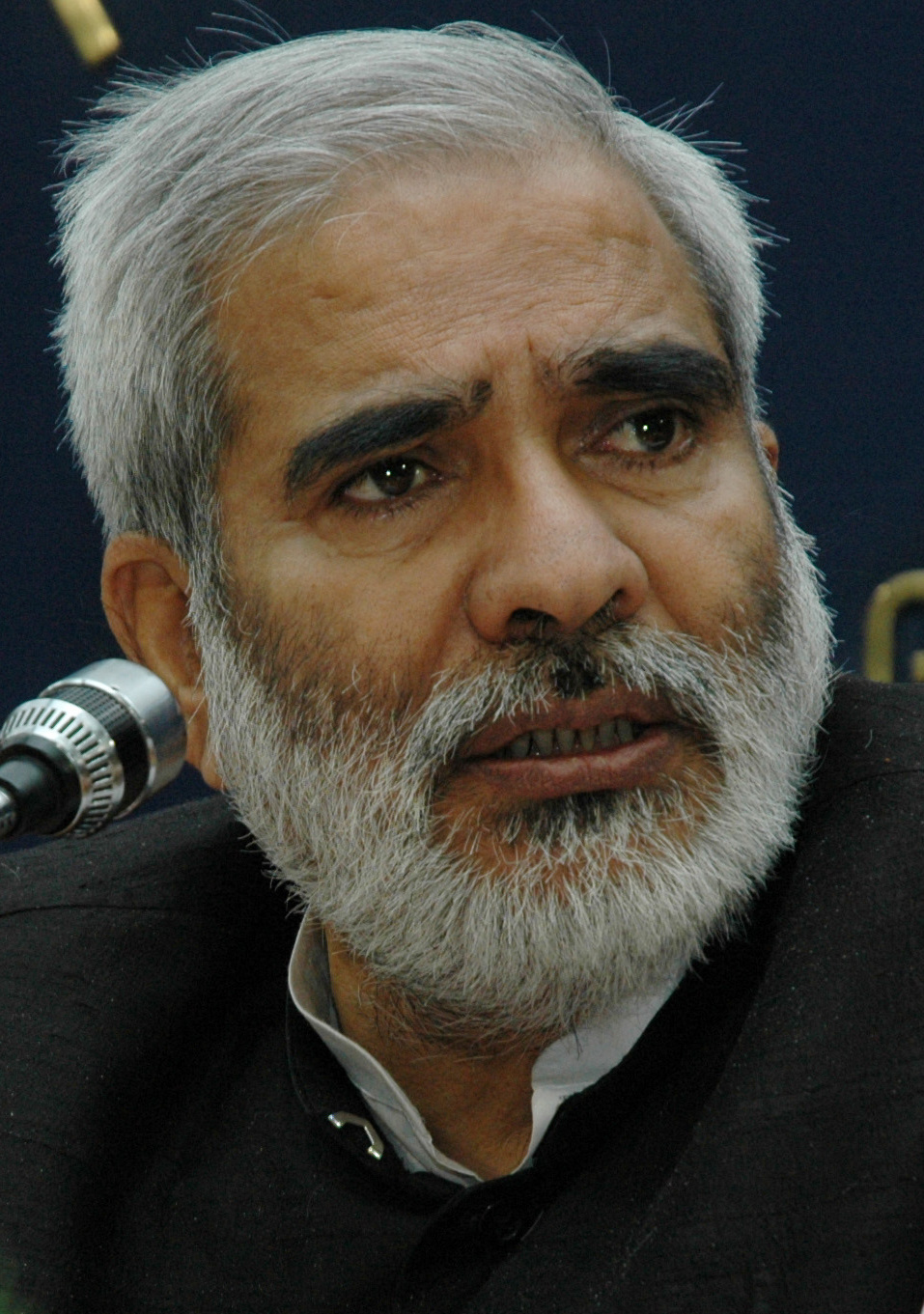
- Raghuvansh Prasad Singh

Member of Parliament, Lok Sabha
- In office 15 May 1996 — 22 May 2014
- Preceded by: Shiva Saran Singh
- Succeeded by: Rama Kishor Singh
- Constituency: Vaishali

Personal details
- Born: 6 June 1946 Vaishali, Bihar, British India
- Died: 13 September 2020 (aged 74) New Delhi, India
- Party: Rashtriya Janata Dal
- Spouse: Kiran Singh
- Children: 3
- Website: Official website
- As of 25 February, 2006

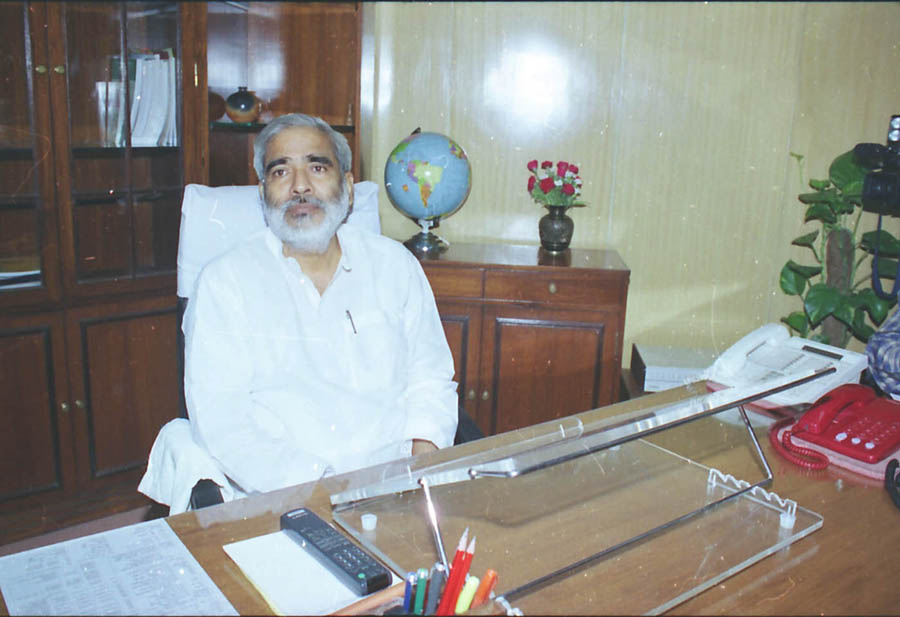
Raghuvansh Prasad Singh in his office after taking charge as the Union Minister of Rural Development in New Delhi on 24 May 2004

Raghuvansh Prasad Singh (6 June 1946 – 13 September 2020) (Note: Raghuvansh Prasad Singh, was former Professor of Mathematics.) was an Indian socialist politician. In the Lok Sabha, he represented the Vaishali constituency of Bihar and was the national vice president of the Rashtriya Janata Dal political party. He was one of the senior most politicians in India as a people's representative in the legislature for four decades from 1977.

He started his political career when he was elected as an MLA and was subsequently made the Energy minister of Bihar in the Karpoori Thakur ministry. He had represented Belsand constituency five times in the Bihar vidhan sabha. He was made the member of Bihar legislative council in a 1991 post. He became the chairman of Bihar legislative council. He has represented Vaishali constituency from Bihar in Lok Sabha consecutively for five terms and has been in the Union cabinet for three terms. He was the Union Cabinet Minister for Rural Development in UPA-I of Manmohan Singh's government and is credited with conceptualization and implementation of NREGA (National rural employment guarantee act).

Singh died from complications from COVID-19 during the COVID-19 pandemic in India at All India Institutes of Medical Sciences in New Delhi on 13 September 2020, at age 74. In his final days, Singh wrote an emotional letter to Lalu Prasad Yadav mentioning the humiliation meted out to him in his last days.

== Early life and education ==
Singh was born in a Rajput family (Note: Despite belonging to an upper caste - he was a Rajput - he practised the upliftement of Lower castes.) of Bihar. He was born to Ramvriksh Singh in the year 1946. He was a Professor and Ph.D. in mathematics and an expert in rural and agricultural landscape in India.

== Political history ==
- Secretary, Samyukta Socialist Party (S.S.P.), Sitamarhi district (1973–77)
- Member, Bihar Legislative Assembly (1977–90)
- Minister of State (Independent charge), Power, Government of Bihar (1977–79)
- President, Lok Dal, Sitamarhi district (1980–85)
- Deputy Speaker, Bihar Legislative Assembly (1990)
- Deputy Leader, Bihar Legislative Council (1991–94)
- Member, Bihar Legislative Council (1991–95)
- Chairman, Bihar Legislative Council (1994–95)
- Minister, Energy, Relief, Rehabilitation and Department of Official Languages, Government of Bihar (1995–96)
- Elected to 11th Lok Sabha (1996)
- Union Minister of State, Animal Husbandry and Dairying (Independent Charge) (1996–97)
- Union Minister of State, Food and Consumer Affairs (Independent Charge) (1997–98)
- Re-elected to 12th Lok Sabha (2nd term) (1998)
- Re-elected to 13th Lok Sabha (3rd term) (1999)
- Leader, Rashtriya Janata Dal Parliamentary Party, Lok Sabha (1999–2000)
- Re-elected to 14th Lok Sabha (4th term) (2004)
- Union Cabinet Minister, Rural Development (2004–09)
- Vice President, Parliamentary Forum on Water Conservation & Management
- Re-elected to 15th Lok Sabha (5th term) (2009)

== Family ==
Singh married Kiran Singh and has 2 sons and 1 daughter.

== Social and cultural activities ==
He was associated with the socialist, Teachers' and Farmers' movements as well as activities related to nation building.

Special Interests

His special interests included social service, the struggle against exploitation, legal aid to the farmers, the labourers and the oppressed, as well as promotion of education and educational reforms.

Sports, clubs, favourite pastimes and recreation

He was interested in Yoga, exercise and music. Among the countries he visited were South Korea, Germany, U.K., Mauritius and U.S.A.

== Other information ==
He was imprisoned during the socialist movement, Lok Nayak Jayaprakash Narayan movement and involved in several political agitations.

== See also ==
- List of politicians from Bihar

== Notes ==
Lok Sabha
Preceded by Lovely Anand	Member of Parliament for Vaishali; 1996 – 2014	Succeeded by Rama Kishore Singh
