= Rama Kishore Singh =

Indian politician

Rama Kishor Singh

Member of the Indian Parliament for Vaishali
- In office 26 May 2014 – 23 May 2019
- Preceded by: Raghuvansh Prasad Singh
- Succeeded by: Veena Devi

Personal details
- Born: Vaishali, Bihar, India
- Party: Lok Janshakti Party (Ram Vilas) (2024–present) Rashtriya Janata Dal (2015–2024) Lok Janshakti Party (2000–2015)
- Spouse: Bina Singh
- Children: 4
- Education: Langat Singh College

Rama Kishore Singh is an Indian politician and is a former member of the Indian Parliament from Vaishali, Bihar. He won the 2014 Indian general election as a Lok Jan Shakti Party candidate. He defeated vice-president of RJD Raghuvansh Prasad Singh by around 1 lakh votes. He enjoys considerable support from the Rajput caste despite having criminal antecedent. Singh hails from the Mahror branch of Rajput clan. He quit all party posts he held on 15 September 2015.

== Life ==
Rama Kishore Singh belongs to a Rajput community and is married to Bina Singh, with whom they have four children. One of their sons, Rajiv Singh, died in a road accident in Uttar Pradesh. Singh was previously a member of the Lok Janshakti Party. In 2020 Tejashwi Yadav tried to include him into Rashtriya Janata Dal to attract Rajput voters, but the induction was put off due to interference by Lalu Prasad Yadav. Singh later managed to get on the ticket from Rashtriya Janata Dal for his wife Bina Singh, who contested in Bihar Assembly polls 2020 from Mahnar constituency.

== Legal cases ==
Rama Singh has been accused of a number of crimes, including murder and kidnapping, but has never been convicted. He has been a member of Bihar Legislative Assembly several times from the Mahnar constituency, which falls under Hajipur Lok Sabha constituency. The Hajipur Lok Sabha constituency is a stronghold of Lok Janshakti Party and Ram Vilas Paswan has represented it several times. Singh was not given a chance to be on the ticket by LJP from Vaishali Lok Sabha constituency in 2019, although he defeated Raghuvansh Prasad Singh in an election for the same seat in 2014.

== Legal proceedings ==
Rama Kishore Singh has been named in a number of criminal investigations and legal proceedings during his political career. The reported status and outcomes of these proceedings have varied.

=== False implication in Chandrama Singh murder case (2004) ===
Following the murder of Chandrama Singh, a candidate in local body elections in Desari, on 25 August 2004, an FIR was lodged naming Rama Kishore Singh and several others as accused. During the trial, the court found that Singh had been in judicial custody at Hajipur for approximately three months prior to the incident, including on the date of the murder. He was subsequently acquitted of the charges.

=== Jaychand Vaidya kidnapping case (2001) ===
Rama Kishore Singh was falsely named as an accused in the 2001 kidnapping case involving businessman Jaychand Vaidya in Bhilai. According to media reports, Singh surrendered before a court after remaining absent from the proceedings for several years. He denied the allegations against him. The cited report notes that other accused in the case were convicted, while proceedings relating to Singh continued separately and ultimately Singh was found to be not guilty.

== Philanthrophy and Community Leadership ==
Rama Kishore Singh has been associated with a range of philanthropic and social initiatives focused on education, community welfare, and charitable service. Over the years, he has supported the establishment and development of educational institutions with the objective of expanding access to quality education for young people, particularly those from economically disadvantaged backgrounds. Through these efforts, numerous students have been provided opportunities to pursue their education and improve their future prospects.

Beyond education, Singh has contributed to charitable causes through donations to orphanages, religious institutions, and community welfare programmes. His philanthropic work has been directed towards supporting underprivileged families, encouraging educational advancement, and promoting social development across Bihar.

Singh has also been associated with the development of the ISKCON temple in Patna and is credited by supporters with assisting in facilitating the acquisition of land for the temple complex, which has since become an important spiritual and cultural centre in the state. He has continued to support religious and community institutions engaged in educational, cultural, and humanitarian activities.

Within the Rajput community, Singh is regarded by many supporters as an influential leader and community representative. Throughout his public life, he has advocated for issues affecting the community and has been recognized by several social and community organizations for his leadership and public service. Supporters credit him with standing alongside members of the community during periods of social and political tension and with promoting their welfare and representation.

His supporters view his public life as being defined not only by his political career but also by his commitment to education, charitable initiatives, community service, and social development. These activities have contributed to his reputation as a prominent public figure in Bihar and among sections of the Rajput community.

== See also ==
- Pradeep Mahto
