= Paroo Assembly constituency =

Coordinates: 26°05′17″N 85°03′54″E

Paroo
- Constituency No. 97 for the Bihar Legislative Assembly

Constituency details
- Country: India
- Region: East India
- State: Bihar
- District: Muzaffarpur
- Lok Sabha constituency: 16. Vaishali
- Established: 1957
- Total electors: 313,093

Member of Legislative Assembly
- 18th Bihar Legislative Assembly
- Incumbent Shankar Prasad Yadav
- Party: RJD
- Alliance: MGB
- Elected year: 2025

Paroo Assembly constituency (also spelt Paru) is an assembly constituency in Muzaffarpur district in the Indian state of Bihar.

== Overview ==
As per Delimitation of Parliamentary and Assembly constituencies Order, 2008, No. 97 Paroo Assembly constituency is composed of the following: Saraiya community development block; Manikpur Bhagwanpur Simra, Chintamanpur, Jagdishpur Baya, Kamalpura, Koriya Nizamat, Laloo Chhapra, Paroo North, Paroo South, Raghunathpur, Rampur Kesho alias Malahi, Bajitpur and Mangurahiyan gram panchayats of Paroo CD Block.

Paroo Assembly constituency is part of No. 16 Vaishali (Lok Sabha constituency).

== Members of the Legislative Assembly ==
Year	Name	Party
1957	Chandu Ram	Indian National Congress
1957	Nawal Kishore Sinha	Indian National Congress
1962	Chandu Ram	Indian National Congress
1967	Shiv Sharan Singh	Samyukta Socialist Party
1969	Virendra Kumar Singh	Indian National Congress
1972	Virendra Kumar Singh	Indian National Congress
1977	Shyam Kumar Prasad Singh	Janata Party
1980	Nitishwar Prasad Singh	Janata Party
1985	Usha Singh	Lokdal
1990	Virendra Kumar Singh	Independent politician
1995	Mithilesh Prasad Yadav	Janata Dal
2000	Mithilesh Prasad Yadav	Rashtriya Janata Dal
2005	Mithilesh Prasad Yadav	Rashtriya Janata Dal
2005	Ashok Kumar Singh	Bharatiya Janata Party
2010	Ashok Kumar Singh	Bharatiya Janata Party
2015	Ashok Kumar Singh	Bharatiya Janata Party
2020	Ashok Kumar Singh	Bharatiya Janata Party
2025	Shankar Prasad Yadav	Rashtriya Janata Dal

== Election results ==
=== 2025 ===
2025 Bihar Legislative Assembly election: Paroo
Party	Candidate	Votes	%	±%
RJD	Shankar Prasad	95,272	41.76	
RLM	Madan Chaudhary	66,445	29.12	
Independent	Ashok Kumar Singh	40,661	17.82	
JSP	Ranjana Kumari	6,825	2.99	
BSP	Vijay Kumar	4,509	1.98	
Independent	Manish Kumar Singh	2,856	1.25	
Independent	Vijay Thakur	2,692	1.18	+0.0
Independent	Niraj Kumar	2,301	1.01	
Independent	Ashutosh Kumar	2,248	0.99	
NOTA	None of the above	2,701	1.18	+0.31
Majority		28,827	12.64	+4.87
Turnout		228,163	72.87	+12.63
RJD gain from BJP		Swing		

=== 2020 ===
2020 Bihar Legislative Assembly election: Paroo
Party	Candidate	Votes	%	±%
BJP	Ashok Kumar Singh	77,392	40.92	−7.29
Independent	Shankar Prasad	62,694	33.15	
INC	Anunay Sinha	13,861	7.33	
RLSP	Madan Chaudhary	7,281	3.85	
Rashtriya Jansambhavna Party	Deepak Tiwari	6,010	3.18	
Independent	Mithu Kumar	3,558	1.88	
API	Sakindar Ram	2,901	1.53	
Independent	Vijay Thakur	2,224	1.18	
Independent	Rajesh Rai	2,191	1.16	+0.81
Rashtriya Jan Jan Party	Prakash Kumar	1,749	0.92	
NOTA	None of the above	1,654	0.87	−2.62
Majority		14,698	7.77	−0.34
Turnout		189,120	60.24	+0.13
BJP hold		Swing		

=== 2015 ===
2015 Bihar Legislative Assembly election: Paroo
Party	Candidate	Votes	%	±%
BJP	Ashok Kumar Singh	80,445	48.21	
RJD	Shankar Prasad	66,906	40.1	
BSP	Phooldeo Sahani	2,899	1.74	
Independent	Vijay Kumar	2,476	1.48	
Independent	Sikendar Ram	1,744	1.05	
JAP(L)	Avinash Kunwar	1,508	0.9	
NOTA	None of the above	5,825	3.49	
Majority		13,539	8.11	
Turnout		166,855	60.11	
