= Jagran Prakashan =

Indian newspaper publisher and mass media company

Jagran Prakashan Limited
- Type: Public
- Traded as: BSE: 532705; NSE: JAGRAN
- Industry: Mass media
- Founded: 18 July 1975 (51 years ago)
- Headquarters: Kanpur, Uttar Pradesh, India
- Key people: Sanjay Gupta (CEO)
- Products: Publishing; Radio; Entertainment; Web portals
- Website: jplcorp.in

Jagran Prakashan Limited is an Indian publishing house listed on the Bombay Stock Exchange and the National Stock Exchange. The company is in the business of printing and publishing newspapers, magazines, journals, and other media. Outdoor advertising, event management and activation services, and internet business are among the Company's other interests. Dainik Jagran Kanpur, Dainik Jagran Gorakhpur, Daily Action Kanpur, and a monthly magazine called Kanchan Prabha Kanpur had been purchased by the company.

== History ==
Jagran Prakashan Limited was incorporated on 18 July 1975 under the Companies Act as "Jagran Prakashan Private Limited" and, subsequently, became a deemed public limited company under Section 43A of the Companies Act. In 2000, upon amendment of Section 43A of the Companies Act, The Company chose to keep its status as a public limited company pursuant to shareholders resolution passed on 31 August 2000. In 2004, The Company was again converted into a private limited company as per the stipulations under the Original Shareholders Agreement and pursuant to shareholders resolution passed on 28 September 2004. Further, on 23 November 2005. The Company was converted into a public limited company in the light of the Issue pursuant to a shareholders resolution passed on 18 November 2005.

The birth of JPL was the brainchild of the late Indian freedom warrior Shri Puran Chandra Gupta. In 1975, a lease arrangement was done to buy the plant and machinery needed for the publishing of newspapers and magazines. The Lucknow version of the Dainik Jagran was first published in 1979, while the Agra edition was first published in 1986. From 1 April 1989, the company's name was changed for the first time from Jagran Prakashan Private Limited to Jagran Prakashan Limited.

== Publications and activities ==
The company produces about 100 editions of around 12 print products in over five distinct languages across 15 states. Dainik Jagran, iNext, Mid-Day, Nai Dunia, Mid-Day Gujarati, Inquilab, Sakhi, Punjabi Jagran, and Jagran Josh are among the Company's print media brands. Jagran New Media, Jagran.com, The Daily Jagran, Jagranjosh.com, Jagran Post, Jagran Junction and Jeetle are some of the company's digital media brands. Jagran Pehel is the company's social initiative.

=== Dainik Jagran ===
Dainik Jagran was founded when the Quit India Movement was launched. Shri Puran Chandra Gupta, JC Arya, and Shri Gurudev, revolutionary liberation warriors, founded the publication in 1942. It was founded on the principle of reflecting the people's free will. Dainik Jagran is now India's largest Hindi language newspaper and the world's 17th most widely read newspaper. The first edition of Dainik Jagran was published in Jhansi in 1942, while the Kanpur edition was published in 1947. The next editions were held in Rewa and Bhopal in 1953 and 1956, respectively. Following that, Dainik Jagran continued to expand, and with the publication of numerous editions, it began to cover the entire Northern India region.

=== Nai Dunia ===
The Madhya Pradesh-based Hindi daily Nai Dunia was purchased by Dainik Jagran for an effective enterprise value of ₹150 crore. Suvi Info Management (Indore) Pvt. Ltd, which manages Nai Dunia through its subsidiary Nai Dunia Media Pvt. Ltd, was acquired by JPL.

=== Radio City ===
Radio City is one of India's biggest radio networks consisting of 79 operational stations. In 2019, Under the Grant of Permission Agreement (GOPA) of Information and Broadcasting Ministry 40 stations were acquired from BIG FM and Radio City also operates 39 other stations. Due to the presence of Radio City in other cities, the radio network could not buy the remaining 18 stations

=== Punjabi Jagran ===
Punjabi Jagran is a Punjabi-language daily newspaper. Amritsar, Bathinda, Chandigarh, Doaba, Gurdaspur, Jalandhar, Kapurthala, Ludhiana, Malwa, and Patiala are among the newspaper's editions. Punjabi Jagran epaper covers all national and international political, business, and sports news on a daily basis.

=== Mid-Day ===
In 2010, Jagran had acquired the print business of Mid-Day Multimedia Ltd (MML), the Mumbai based publishing house that owned the English-language afternoon daily Mid-Day.

=== The Daily Jagran ===
In June 2025, Jagran announced a revamp of Dainik Jagran's English news subdomain as TheDailyJagran.com.

=== HerZindagi.com ===
HerZindagi.com is a website focusing on women's lifestyle and is owned by Jagran New Media.

== Controversies ==
Allegations of bias against the Jagran group and its papers have been raised since it was censured in 1990 by the Press Council of India for inflammatory content following the demolition of the Babri Masjid. One of the examples cited of such reporting involved reports of persons killed by the police; while most papers put the number based on information received at 32, Dainik Jagran reported it as 300 deaths. These reports coincided with the Dainik Jagran's expansion from reporting within Uttar Pradesh to outside the state as well, with a Delhi edition launched in 1990. Dainik Jagran has consistently advocated for the construction of the Ram Mandir on the ground where the Babri Masjid was demolished, which is also a political stance adopted by the Bharatiya Janata Party.

In 2010, Dainik Jagran was one of two newspapers (in addition to Dainik Bhaskar) that was flagged by the Press Council of India for carrying paid news.

In 2017, Dainik Jagran published an exit poll favouring the Bharatiya Janata Party before the results of the Uttar Pradesh state election results were declared in 2017, which violated the Election Commission of India's regulations that prohibit the publication of exit polls before election results are declared. Following this, the Election Commission ordered the Uttar Pradesh police to register a case against the editor of the Dainik Jagran for violating the Representation of People's Act and the Indian Penal Code. The editor, Sanjay Gupta, who was also the CEO of the Jagran Group CEO stated to The Indian Express that the poll was carried by their advertising department, i.e. it had been posted for compensation to the group.

The published poll was attributed to "RDI" and later, officials from an entity called the Resource Development International (I) Private Limited were also listed by the Election Commission of India as having violated election laws. Resource Development International (I) Private Limited and one other organisation engaged in electoral research in India bearing the same abbreviation of 'RDI' both denied involvement in preparing the exit poll. The second organization named RDI is run by Devendra Kumar, an affiliate of the Bharatiya Janata Party. Following the registration of First Information Reports, police raided Dainik Jagran's offices and the homes of some employees, and arrested their online editor, Shekhar Tripathi. He was later released on bail.

In relation to the exit poll publication as well as multiple editorial posts supporting the Bharatiya Janata Party, the Jagran Prakashan publications, including Dainik Jagran and its English equivalent, Jagran Josh, have been criticised by media watchdog Newslaundry, news website DailyO, and news magazine Caravan for carrying one-sided coverage supporting the Bharatiya Janata Party and its policies while in government, particularly in the state of Uttar Pradesh, where the company sent vans bearing the Dainik Jagran logo to support and conduct publicity on behalf of the Uttar Pradesh Government led by Adityanath. Both, Caravan and Newslaundry have pointed to the doubling of advertisement revenue from government sources since the Bharatiya Janata Party formed the government at the Center as being linked with increasing pro-government content in Jagran's English, Hindu and Urdu publications. In 2018, investigative journalism website Cobrapost published videos purporting to show that employees of several news organisations, including from the Jagran Group, were willing to promote political and religious content relating to Hindutva and the Bharatiya Janata Party in exchange for compensation. Jagran Group CEO Sanjay Gupta denied the allegations, stating that the Jagran Group employee identified in the videos did not have the authority to make any such commitments on behalf of the Group.

In July 2020, Gupta was added to the board of Prasar Bharati, India's public broadcasting body.
