= Garibnath Temple =

Hindu temple in India

Baba Garibnath Dham Muzaffarpur
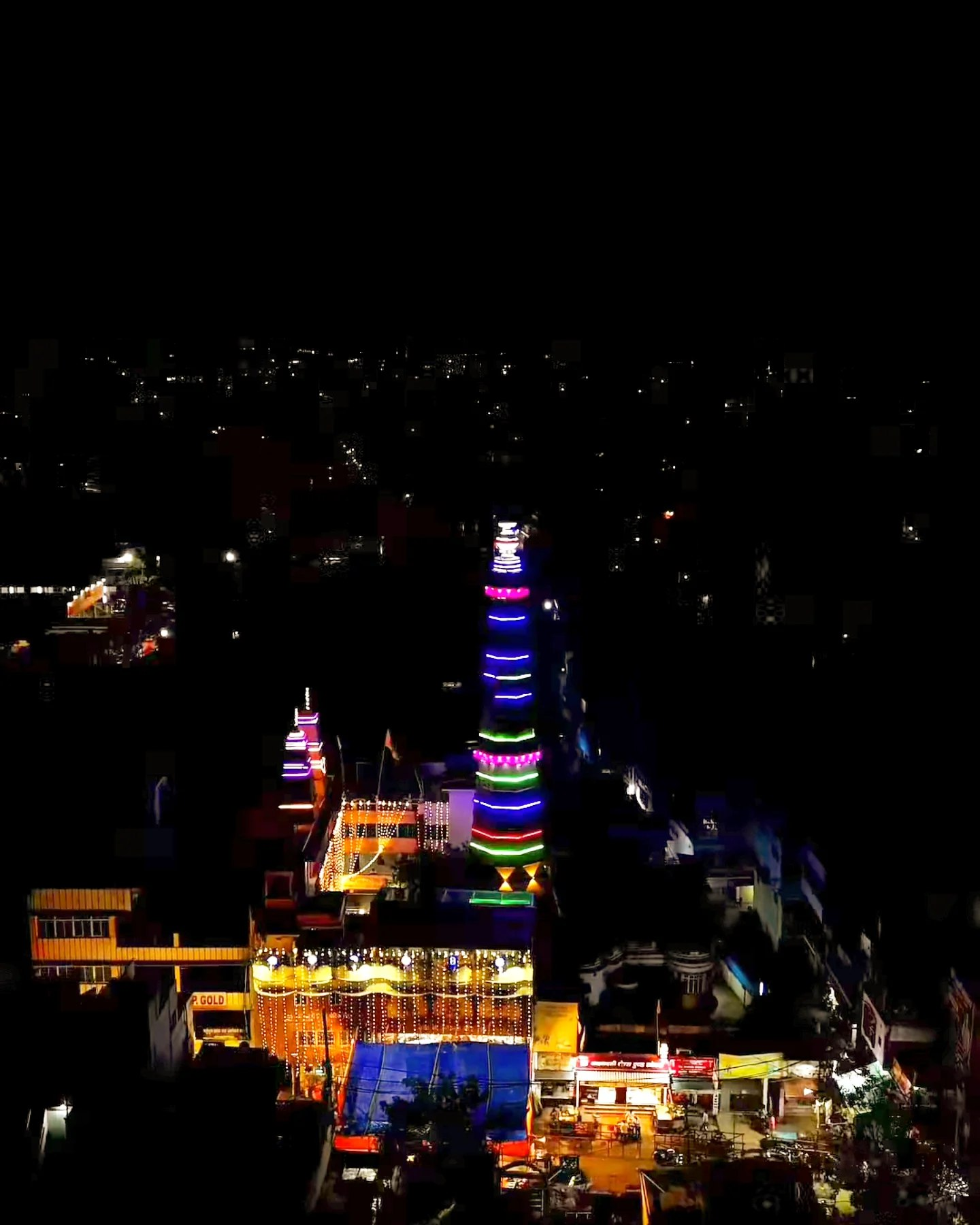

- Location within Bihar Location within India

Religion
- Affiliation: Hinduism
- District: Muzaffarpur
- Deity: Garibeshwara Or Garibnath (Lord Shiva)
- Festivals: Maha Shivaratri; Sharabani Mela; Naag Panchami
- Governing body: Bihar State Board of Religious Trusts
- Status: Functioning

Location
- State: Bihar
- Country: India
- Interactive map of Baba Garibnath Dham Muzaffarpur
- Coordinates: 26°7′28″N 85°23′25″E

Architecture
- Type: Nagara architecture
- Creator: Mahavir Chachan

Website
- garibnathdham.in

Garibnath Temple Muzaffarpur is a Hindu holy place in Muzaffarpur in the Indian state of Bihar. The temple is one of the oldest temples dedicated to Lord Shiva and known as the "Deoghar of Bihar" Devotees from all across the district and state come here to pray and wish for their better life ahead. It is believed that prayer during the month of Sawan has special significance, which helps to fulfill all wishes. The temple is very crowded during these days. The presiding deity is known by the names Garibnath and Garibeshwara , meaning Lord of the poors.

== History ==
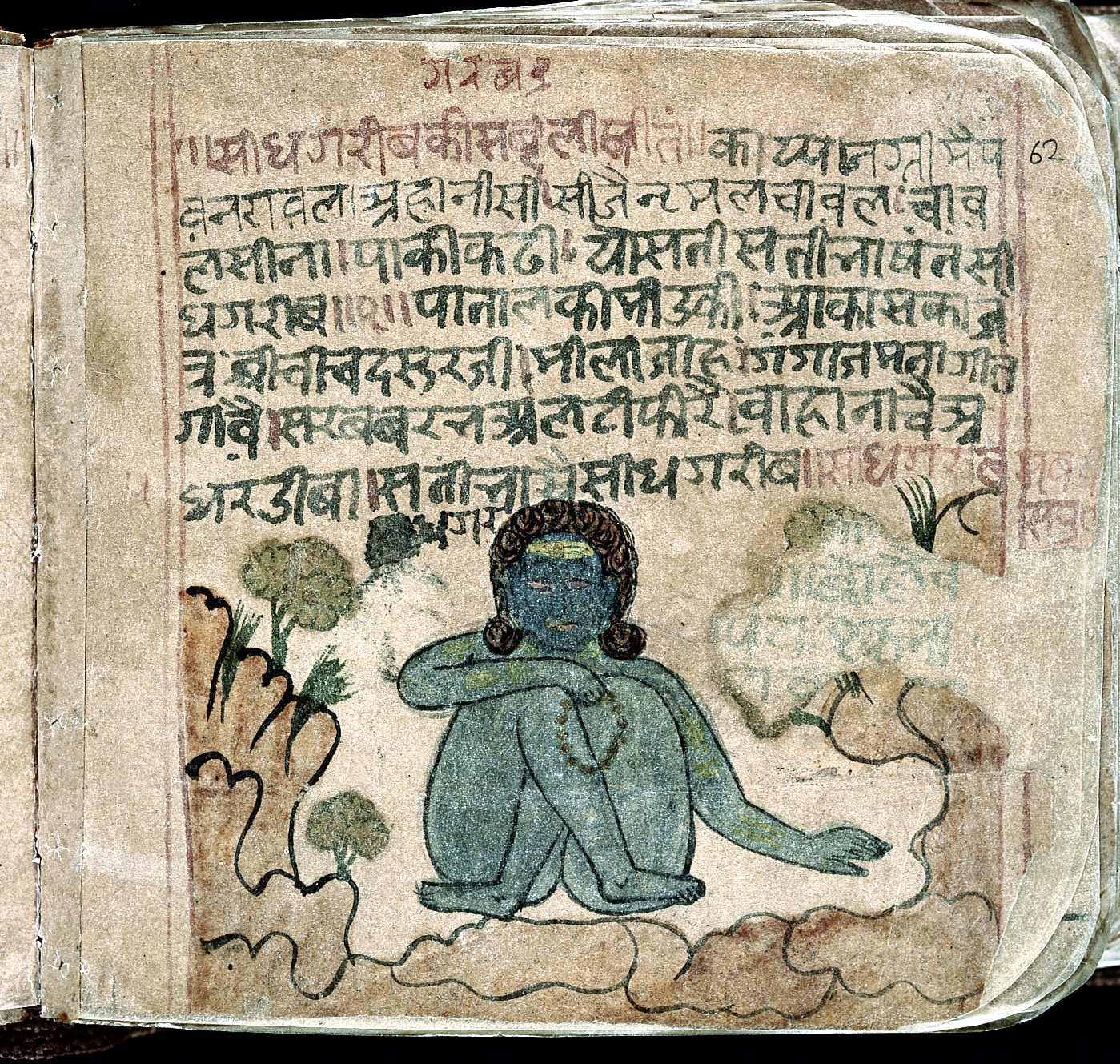
Illustrated manuscript depiction of Siddha Gariba.

According to religious beliefs, Baba Garibnath Dham has a history of about three hundred years. It is believed that earlier there was a dense forest and there were seven peepal trees in between. It is said that at the time of the cutting of these trees, blood-red substances started coming out and a huge lingam was found here. People tell that Baba appeared in the land owner's dream, since then worship is being here.

== Location ==
Baba Garibnath Dham is located near Purani bazar in Muzaffarpur.

Nearby Railway Station:- Muzaffarpur jn. (MFP)

Nearby Bus Stand:- Imlichatti Government Bus Stand, Muzaffarpur

People can also take other public transport via road, such as auto rikshaw or e-rickshaw.

== Gallery ==
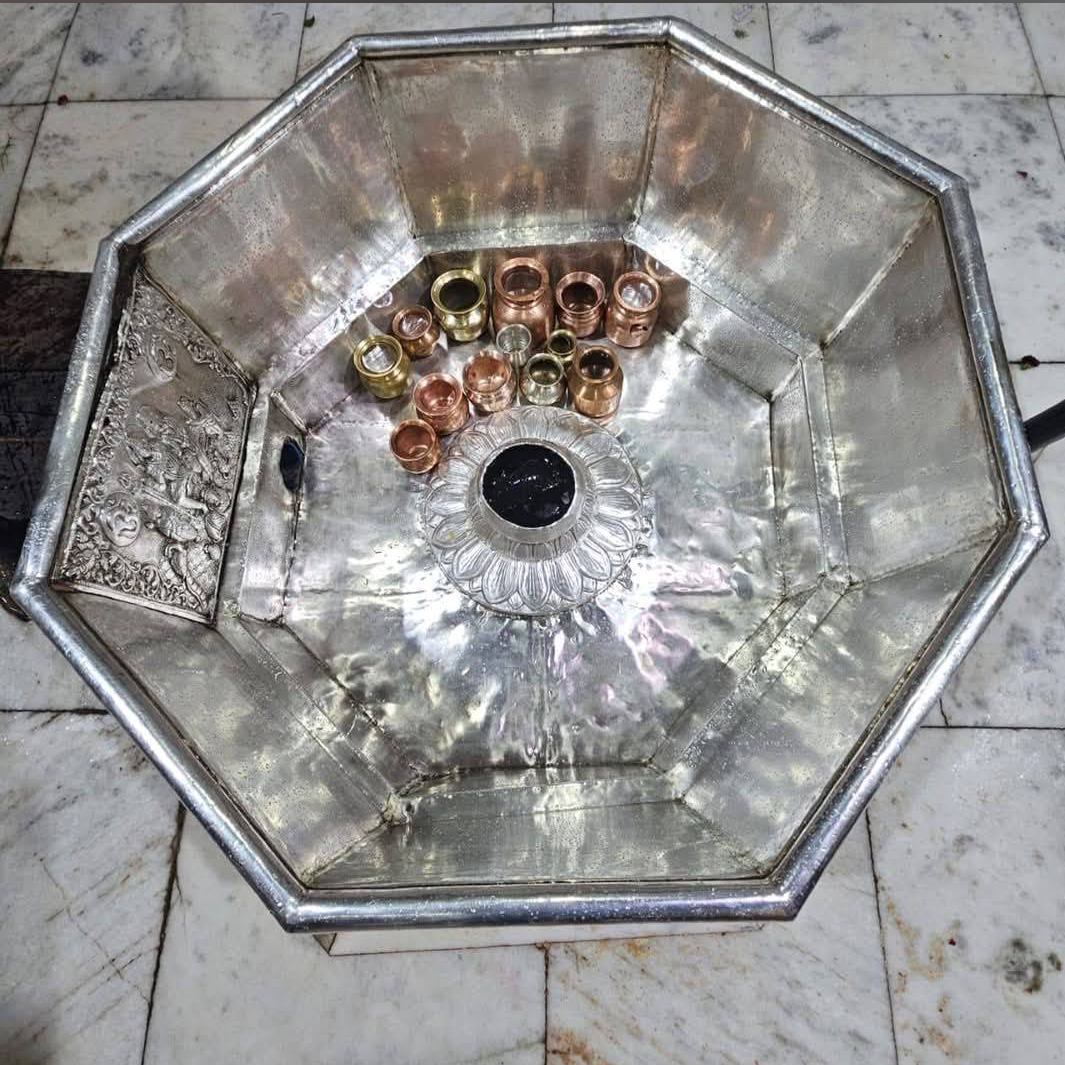
Shivling

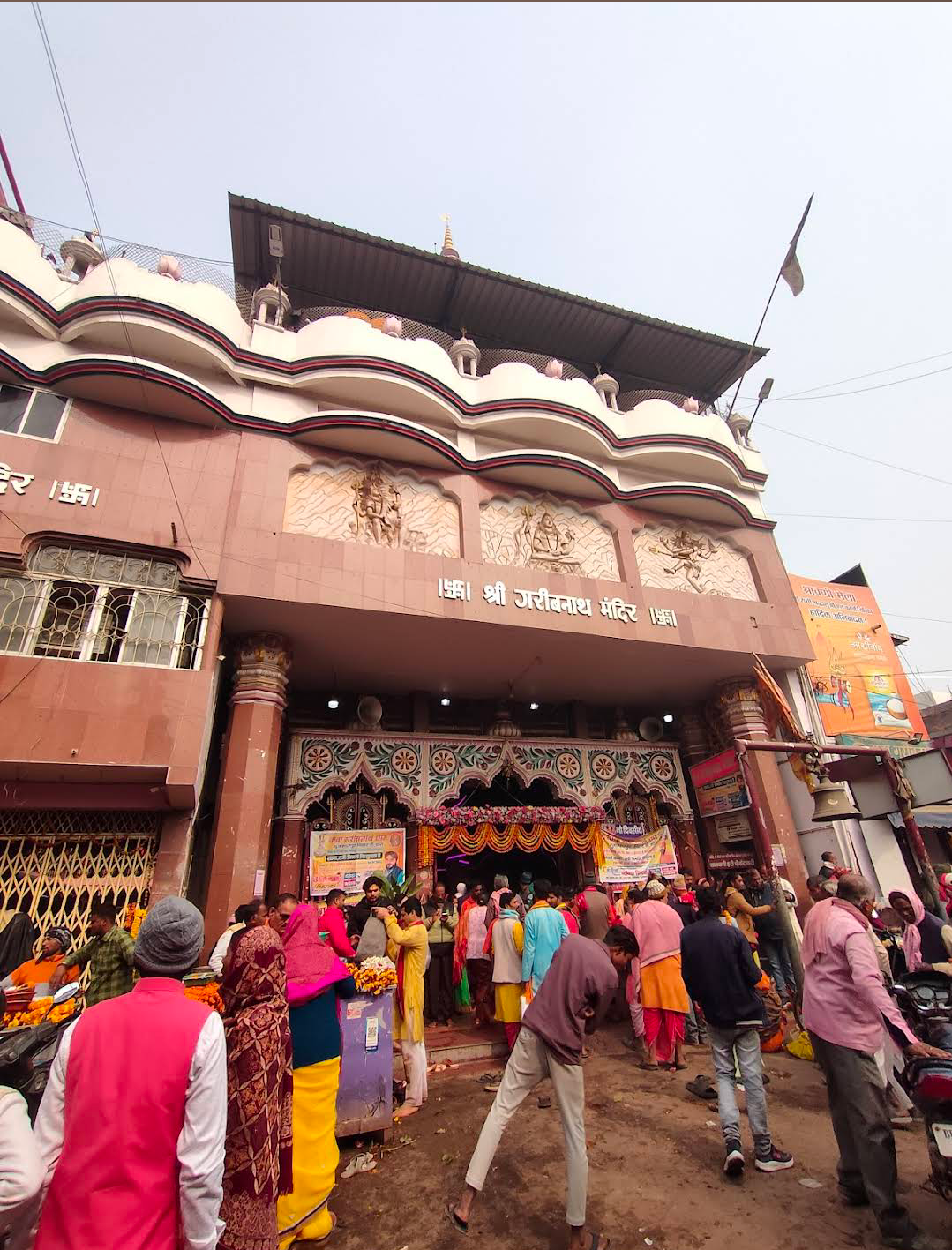
Main Entrance

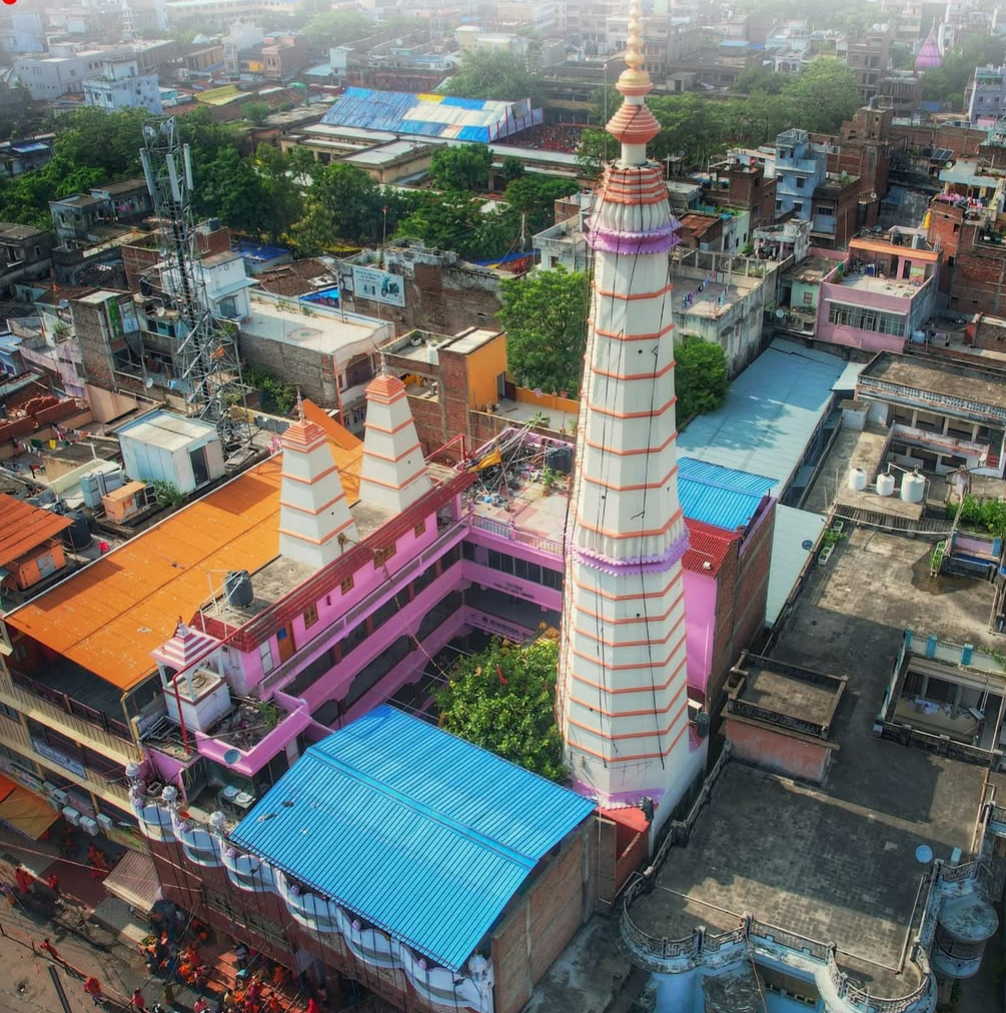
Aerial View

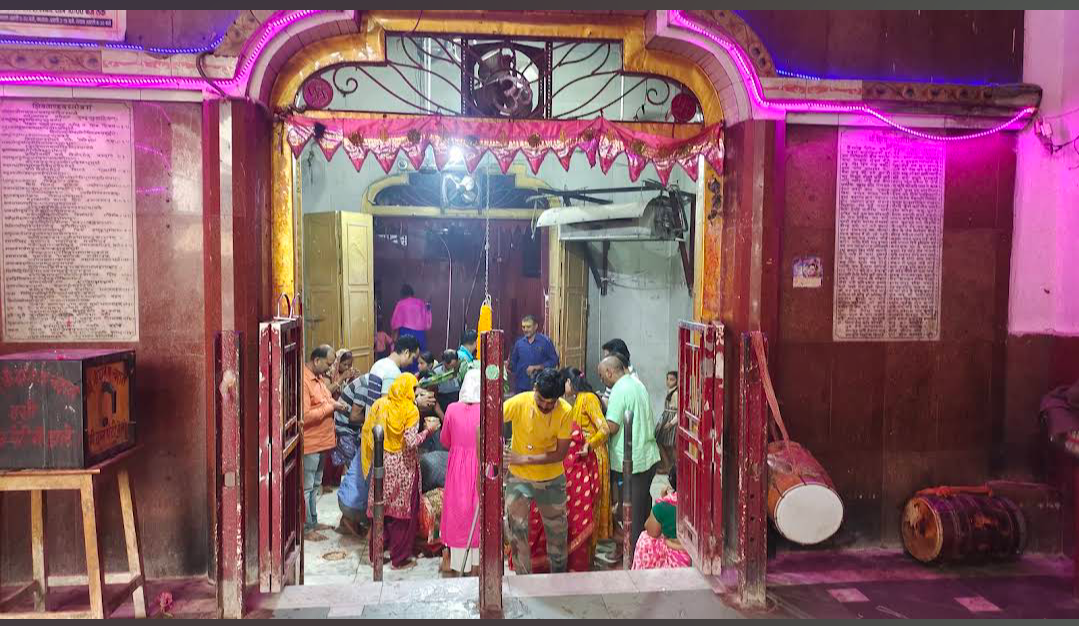
Front View of Garbhagriha

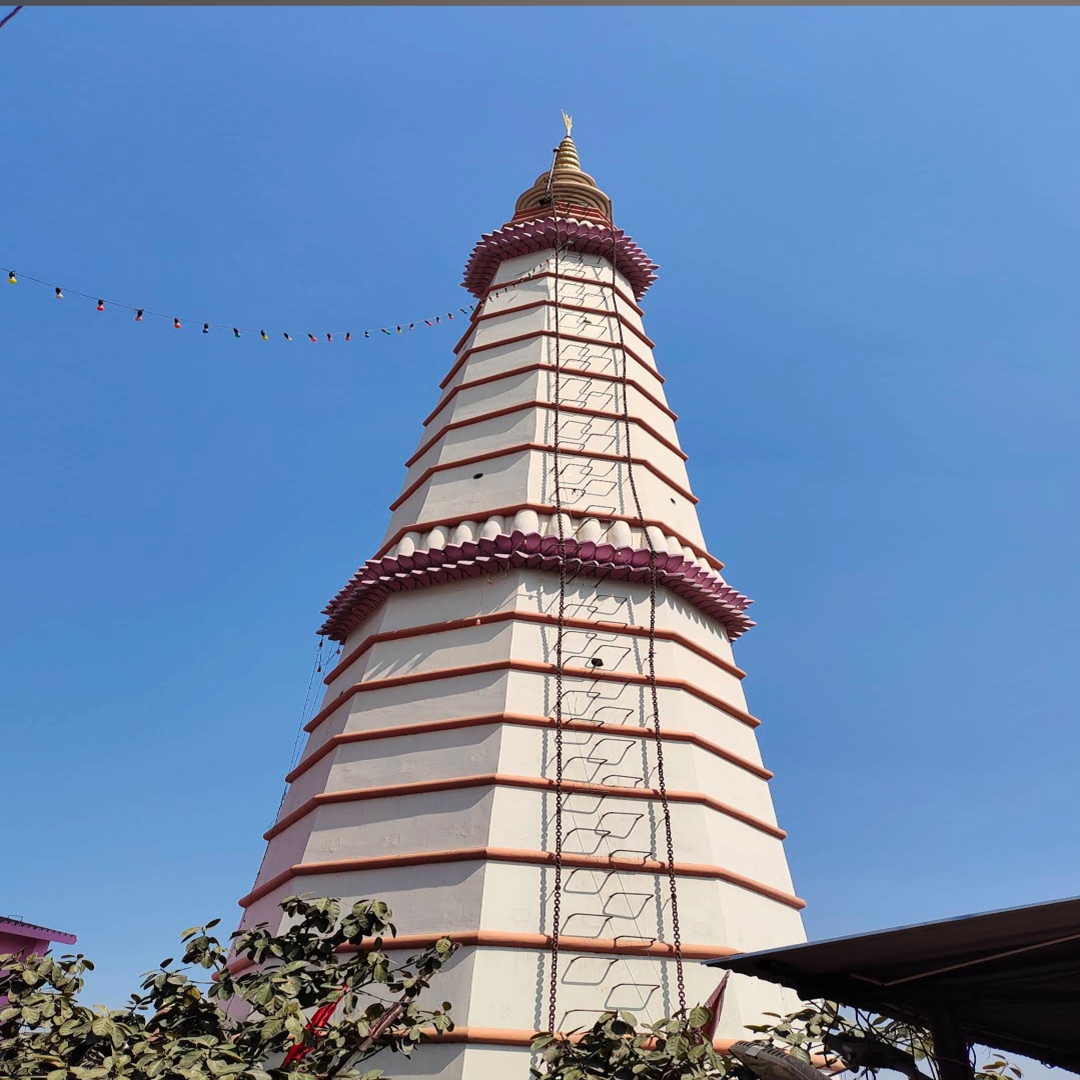
Shikhar
