= Sujini embroidery =

Embroidery tradition of Bihar, India and registered geographic indication

Sujini Embroidery
- Geographical indication
- Alternative names: Sujani
- Description: Sujani embroidery tradition of Muzaffarpur District of Bihar
- Type: Textile art
- Area: Muzaffarpur District
- Country: India
- Registered: 21 September 2006
- Material: A traditional textile fabric of the simplest stitches, with any fabrics and also old pieces of cloth

The Sujini embroidery or Sujani embroidery is a textile-based expressive art product, protected under the GI registration act. It is usually a quilt or bedspread, which was earlier made from old clothes, but is now generally made from readily available fabric, with embroidery done using the simplest stitches, with motifs narrating stories. It is exclusively made by women in 15 villages of Bhusra in the Gaighat block of Muzaffarpur and a few villages of Madhubani in the Indian state of Bihar.

The Sujani embroidery work of Bihar is protected under the Geographical Indications of Goods (Registration & Protection) Act (GI Act) 1999 of the Government of India. It was registered by the Controller General of Patents Designs and Trademarks under the title "Sujani Embroidery Work of Bihar" and recorded under GI Application number 74, Class 26 as a textile item. The GI tag was approved on 21 September 2006.

== Location ==
Bhusra, the village where the craft work originated, is 100 kilometres (62 mi) away from where the art of Mithila painting started. It was done in the olden days and even now by rural women of Muzaffarpur district of north Bihar.

== History ==
The earliest known traditional practice of making the embroidered Sujani quilt is traced to the 18th century. Its basic purpose was to give a soft cover to the newly born babies immediately after birth. It was then made with pieces of cloth in different colors derived from used saris and dhotis by sewing them together, adopting a simple running stitch. This process involved the use of three or four patches of old saris or dhotis, fitted one over the other and then quilting them together using the thread that was also drawn from the discarded garments. Motifs expressing the desire of the mother for her newborn child were sewn on the quilt, generally done with a chain stitch in dark color.

The Sujani technique is based on two ancient beliefs. In one ritualistic tradition, it represented the presence of a deity known as "Chitiriya Ma, the Lady of the Tatters". It symbolized the concept of unifying together incongruous elements holistically into a unified whole. The second objective was to make a soft coverlet to wrap the newly born child as if the child was in the soft hug of its mother.

The word Sujani is a compound word of ‘su’ meaning "easy and facilitating" and ‘jani’ meaning "birth".

The motifs sewn on the quilt represented sun and cloud, indicative of life-giving forces, fertility symbols, sacred animals, and mythical animals to protect against evil forces, and to attract blessings from the gods. Use of different shades of threads symbolized life's forces such as red, symbolic of blood and yellow denoting the sun.

The above pattern of making the Sujani product had almost become extinct till it was revived in 1988 at the initiative of Nirmal Devi of the Mahila Vikas Sahyog Samiti (MVSS), an autonomous society, located in the village of Bhusra near Muzaffarpur. Now, there are about 600 women of 22 villages around Bhusra who actively pursue this craft work.

== Product details ==
The quilt that is made with this embroidery work represents the feelings of agony and ambitions of women in a man's world. She is making the craft work in the form of specific motifs embroidered on both sides of the product. On one face of the fabric the motifs express the women's anguish to the form of the violent behavior of drunk men towards his wife, act of giving dowry seeking a groom during the marriage, village men gathered at a village meeting place, and women covered with a veil. The other face of the product depicts a woman's ambition of earning a living by selling her product in a marketplace or a woman lecturing in an assembly of people, a woman holding court and showing her prowess.

The materials used in making this product now are expensive pieces of cotton such as "Salita" or a cheaper variety of white or coloured marking, Tussar silk, casement cloth, and embroidery threads such as moon thread or rangoli or anchor thread. The motifs are designed by the women sewing the quilt, usually of their choice. The embroidery is done as a fine running stitch with the thread of the same colour as the background cloth. For the main outline of the proposed pattern, chain stitch using black, brown and red thread is used.

The products made now are as quilts or bed sheets. They have designs of rural scenes, episodes of Hindu epics, current social themes such as female infanticide, violence during elections, women's education, and domestic abuse. Also, notable designs seen are of health aspects, about the environment and expression of women's rights.
