= Muzaffarpur =

City in Bihar, India

- City
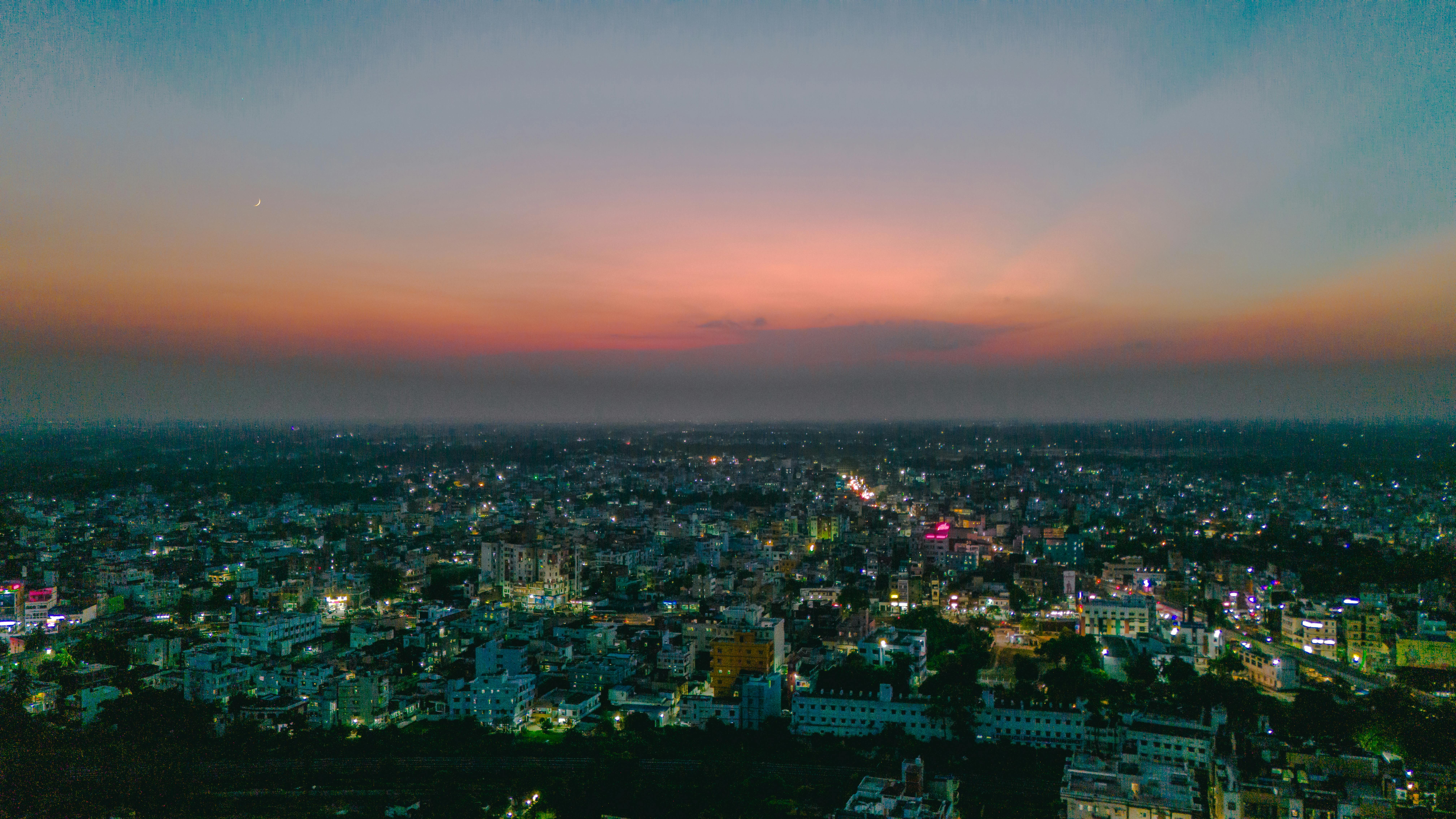
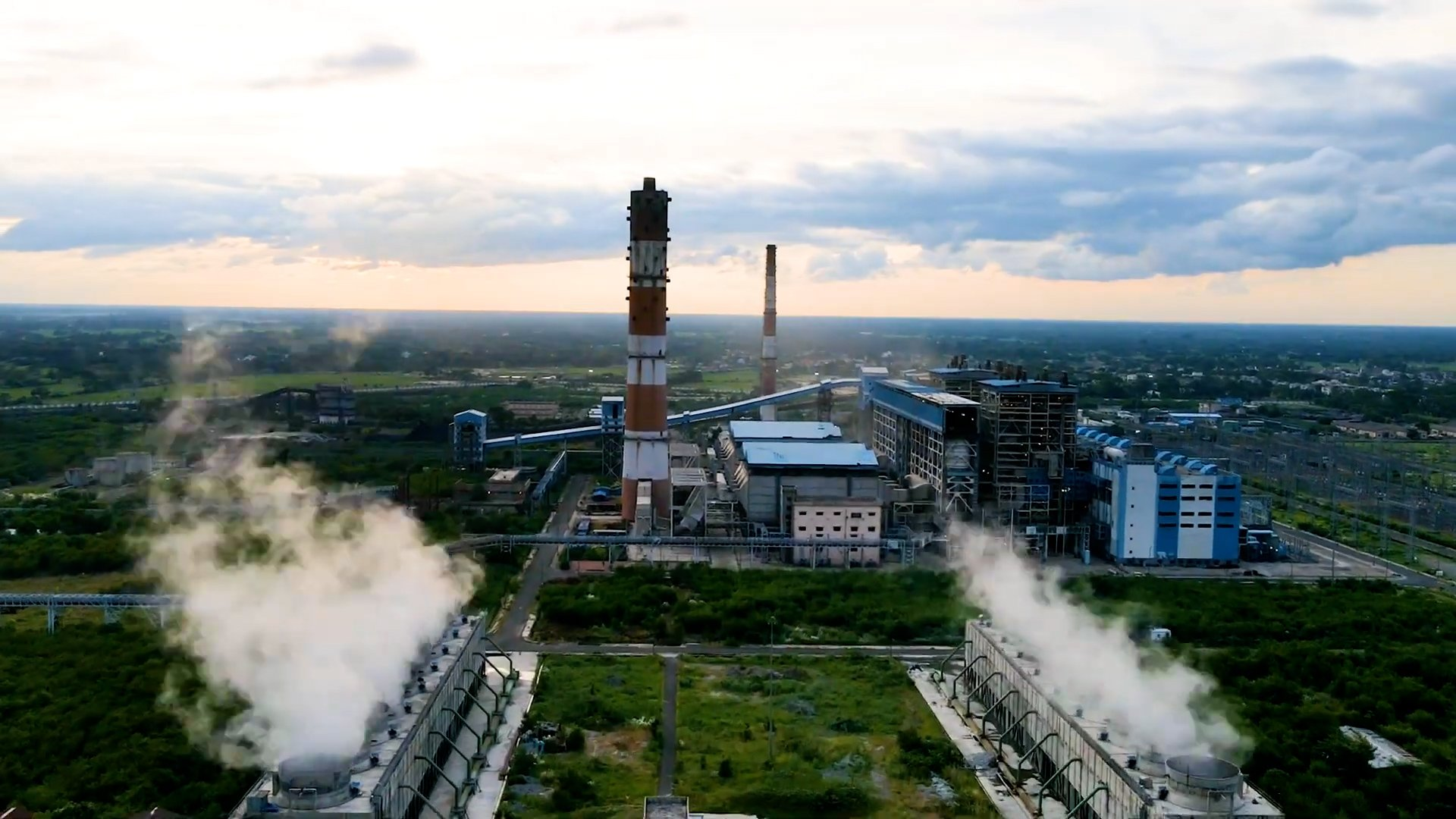
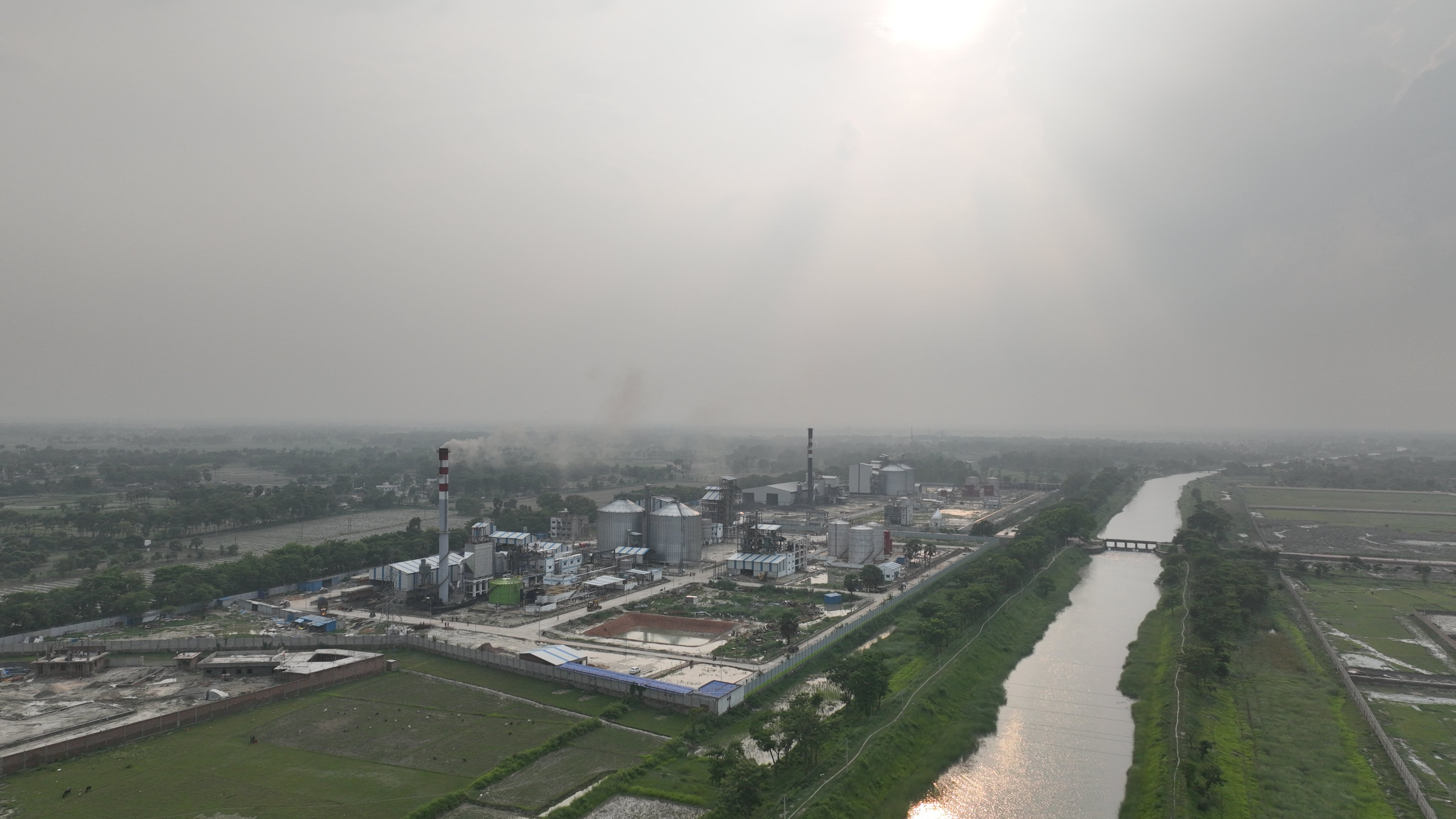
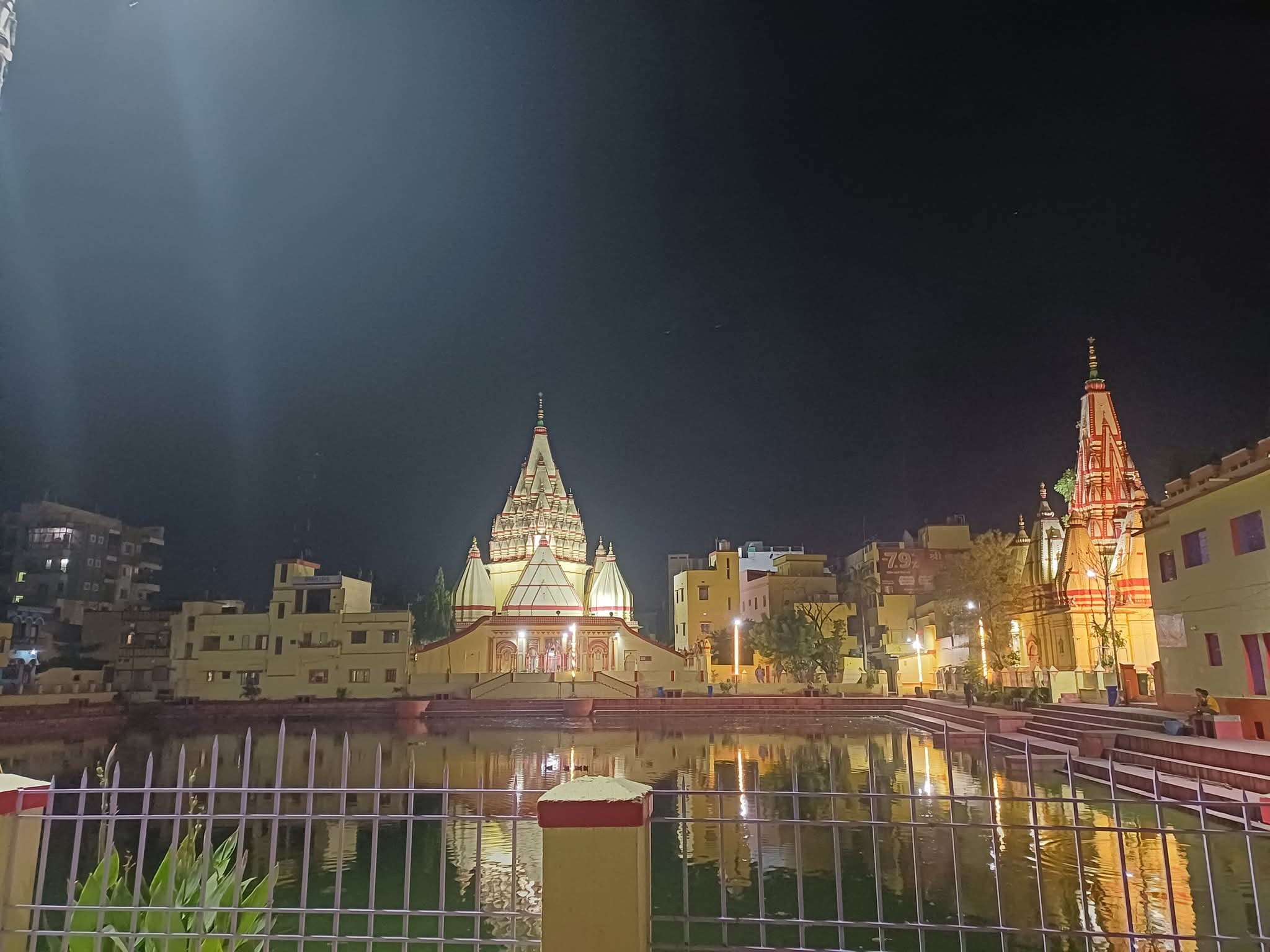
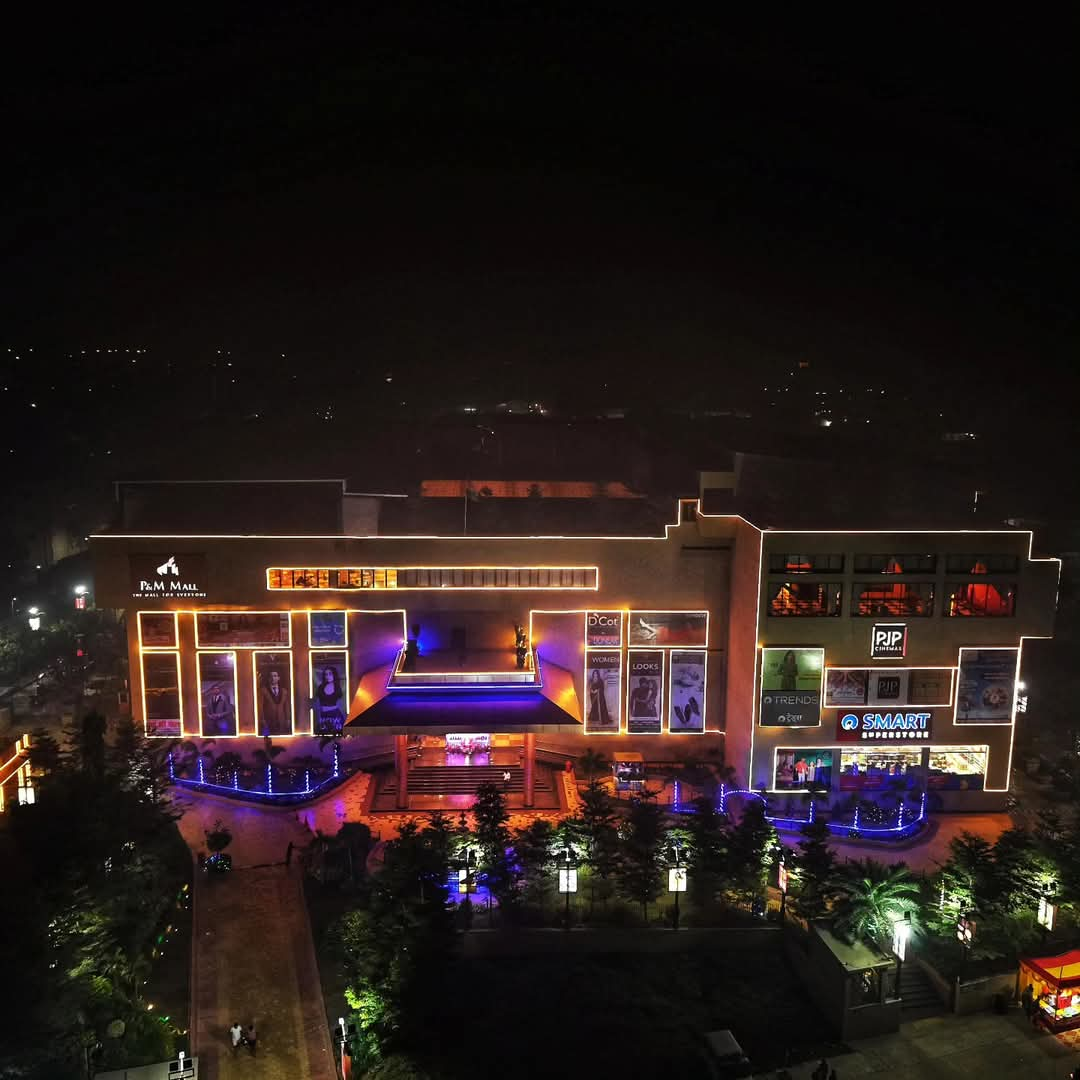
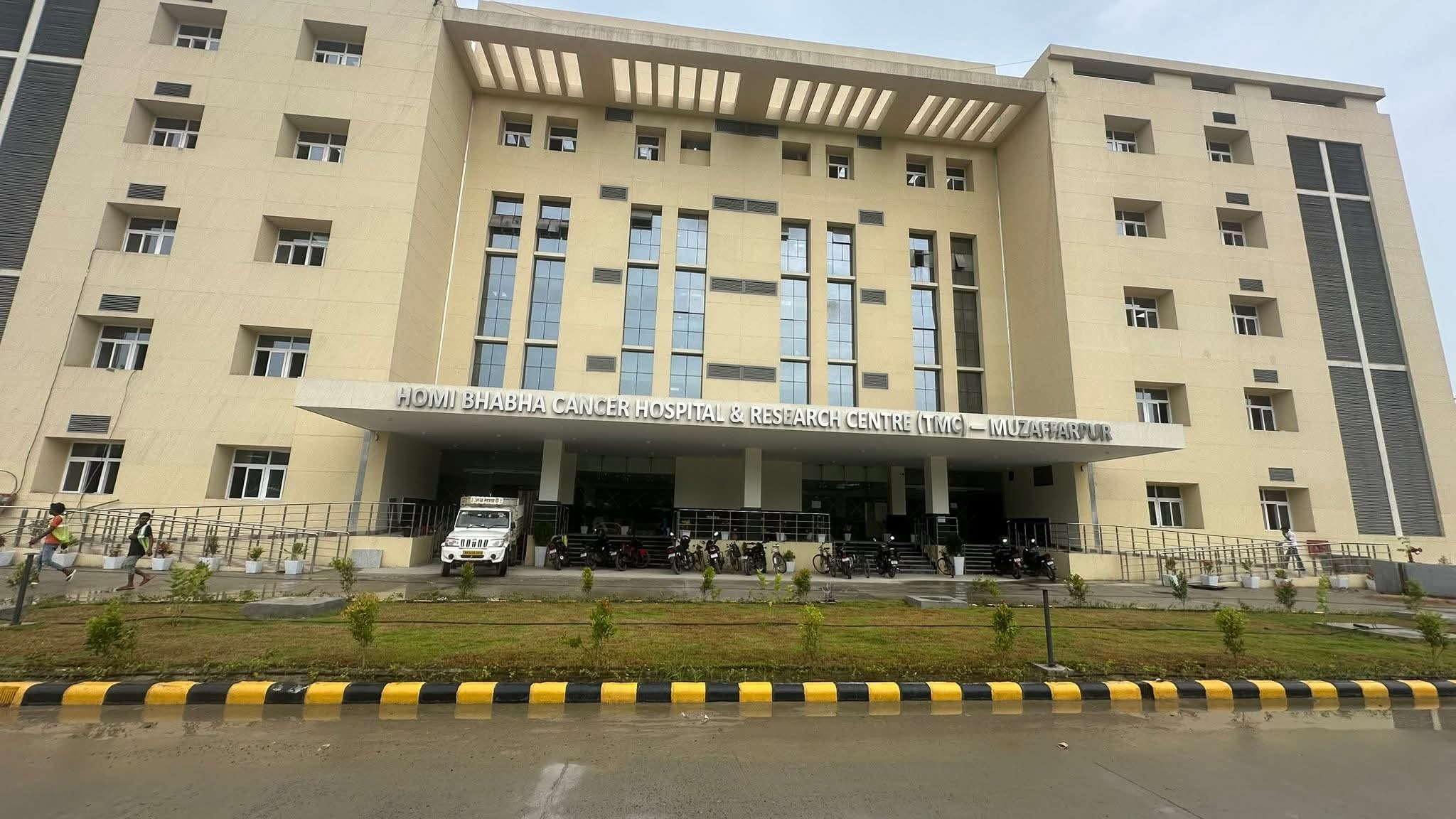
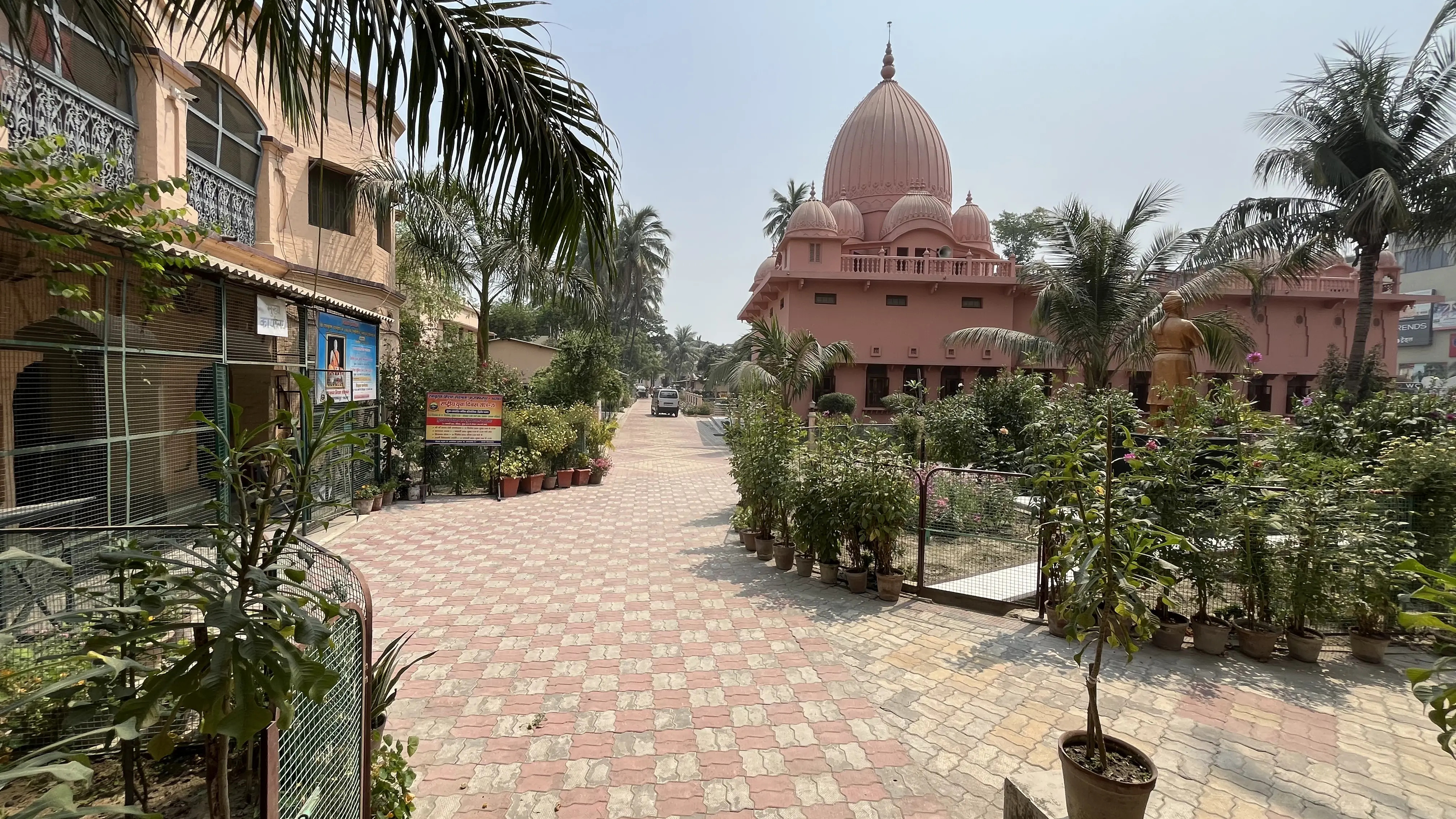
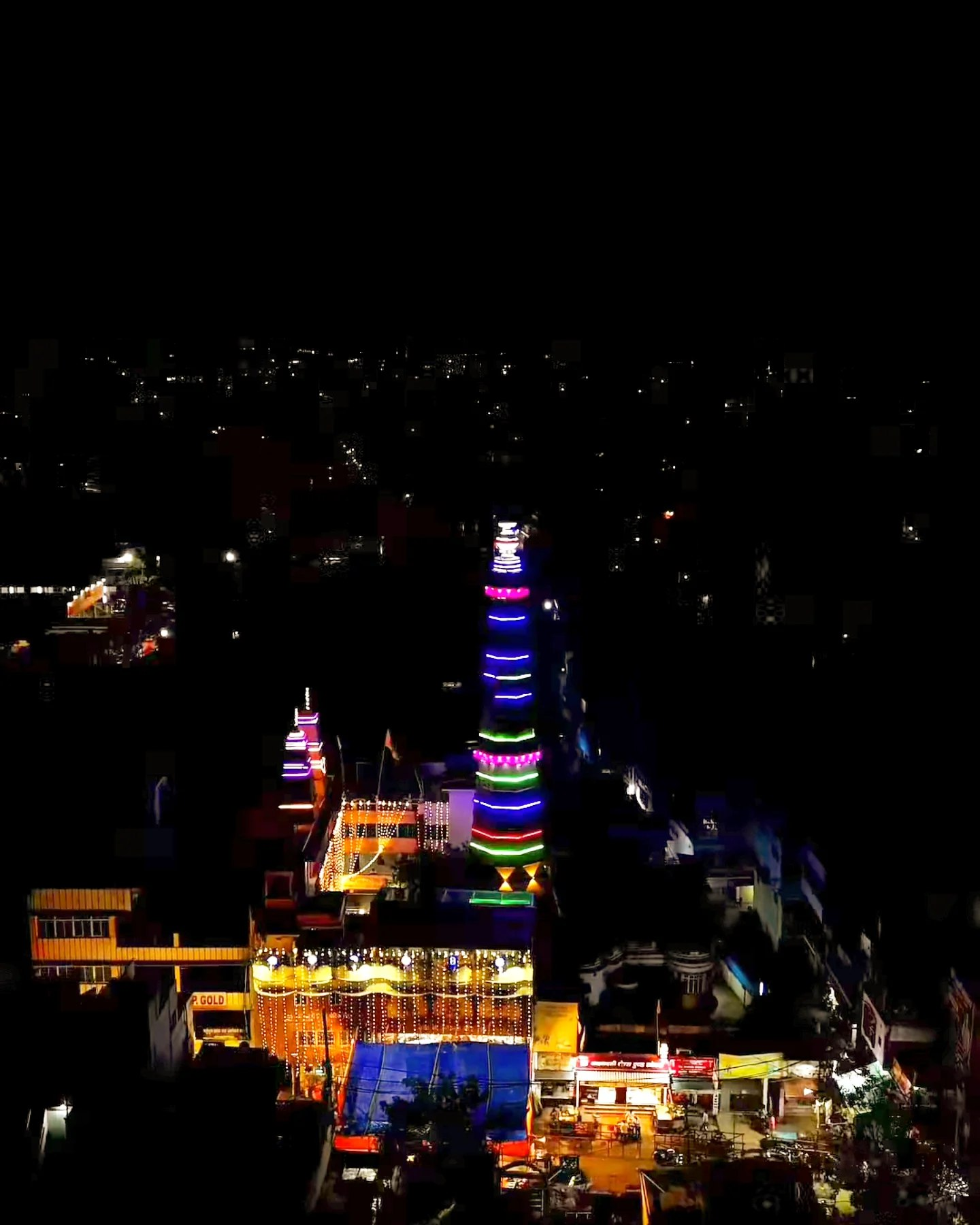
- Muzaffarpur City Aerial View NTPC Kanti Bio Fuel Unit Sahu Pokhar P&M Mall Cancer Hospital RamaKrishna Mission Seva Sharam Garibnath Temple
- Nickname: Capital of North Bihar
- Interactive map of Muzaffarpur
- Coordinates: 26°7′21″N 85°23′26″E
- Country: India
- State: Bihar
- Region: Tirhut division
- District: Muzaffarpur
- Established: 01 January 1875

Government
  - Type: Municipal Corporation
  - Body: Muzaffarpur Municipal Corporation
  - Mayor: Nirmala Sahu
  - Municipal Commissioner: Vikram Virkar (IAS)
  - SP City: Kota Kiran (IPS)
  - Member of Parliament: Raj Bhushan Choudhary (BJP)
  - MLA: Ranjan Kumar (BJP)

Area
  - Total: 91 km^{2} (35 sq mi)
- Elevation: 60 m (200 ft)

Population (2011)
  - Total: 354,462

Languages
  - Official: Hindi
  - Additional official: English
  - Regional: Bajjika
- Time zone: UTC+5:30 (IST)
- PIN: 842001–842005
- Telephone code: 0621
- ISO 3166 code: IN-BR
- Vehicle registration: BR-06
- Sex ratio: 1000:890 ♂/♀
- Lok Sabha constituency: Muzaffarpur
- Vidhan Sabha constituency: Muzaffarpur,
- Website: muzaffarpur.bih.nic.in

Muzaffarpur also spelled as Mozufferpore, is a city located in Muzaffarpur district on the banks of Burhi Gandak river in the Tirhut division of the Indian state of Bihar. It serves as the headquarters of the Tirhut division, the Muzaffarpur district. It is the fourth most populous city in Bihar. (Note: It is also one of the largest cities in Bihar.)

Muzaffarpur is known for Shahi litchis and is known as the Lychee Kingdom. Shahi lychee is the fourth product from Bihar to get the Geographical Indication (GI) tag, after jardalu mango, katarni rice and Magahi paan (betel leaf). The city is situated on the banks of the perennial Budhi Gandak River, which flows from the Someshwar Hills of the Himalayas.

== Etymology ==
The current city was established in 1875 during the British Raj for administrative convenience, by dividing the Tirhut district and was named after an aumil, Muzaffar Khan; thus the city came to be known as Muzaffarpur.

== History ==
The city was founded in 18th century during British Raj period and was constituted a municipality in 1864. A major road and rail hub, it is a trade centre on the route between Patna (south) and Nepal (north). Lychee, sweet corn, mango, vegetables, rice and sugar milling alongside cutlery manufacturing are the chief industries.

In 1972, the Sitamarhi and Vaishali districts were split off from Muzaffarpur.

== Geography ==
Muzaffarpur is located at 26°07′N 85°24′E. The city lies in a highly active seismic zone of India. In the disastrous earthquake on 15 January 1934, much of the town suffered severe damage and many people died. It has an average elevation of 47 meters (154 feet). This saucer shaped, low-centered town lies on the great Indo-Gangetic plains of Bihar, over Himalayan silt and sand brought by the glacier-fed and rain-fed meandering rivers of the Himalayas.

== Demographics ==
As of the 2011 India census, Muzaffarpur had a population of 393,724. Males constituted 52.96% (208,509) of the population and females 47.04% (185,215). Muzaffarpur had a literacy rate of 85.16%. Male literacy was 88.83%, and female literacy was 81.05%.

As per 2011 census data, there are total 275,233 Hindus whereas 74,680 Muslims and 1,352 Christians along with other small minorities.

Religion in Muzaffarpur (2011)
1. Hinduism (77.7%)
2. Islam (21.1%)
3. Other (1.28%)

=== Gallery ===
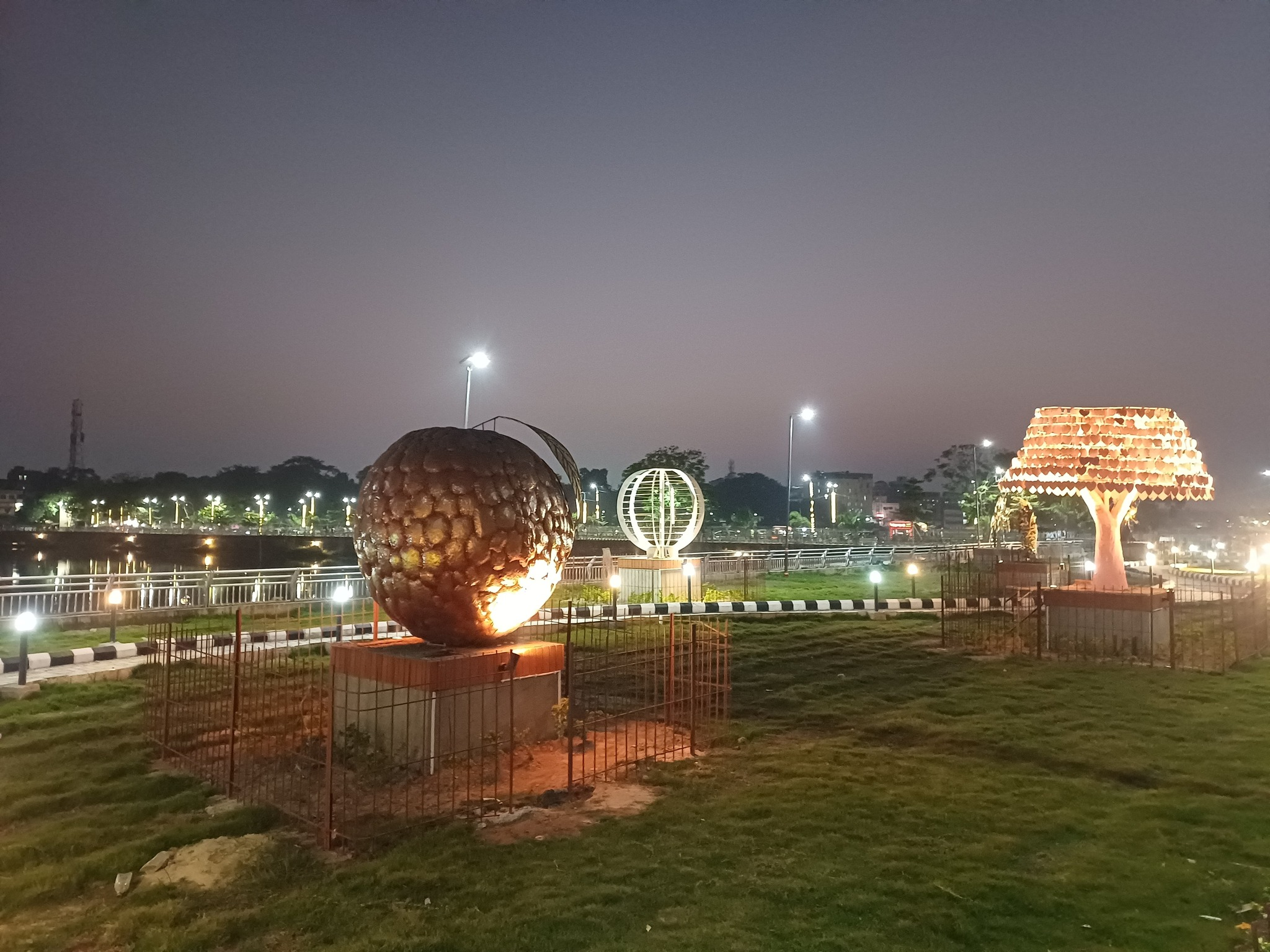
Sikanadarpur Mann

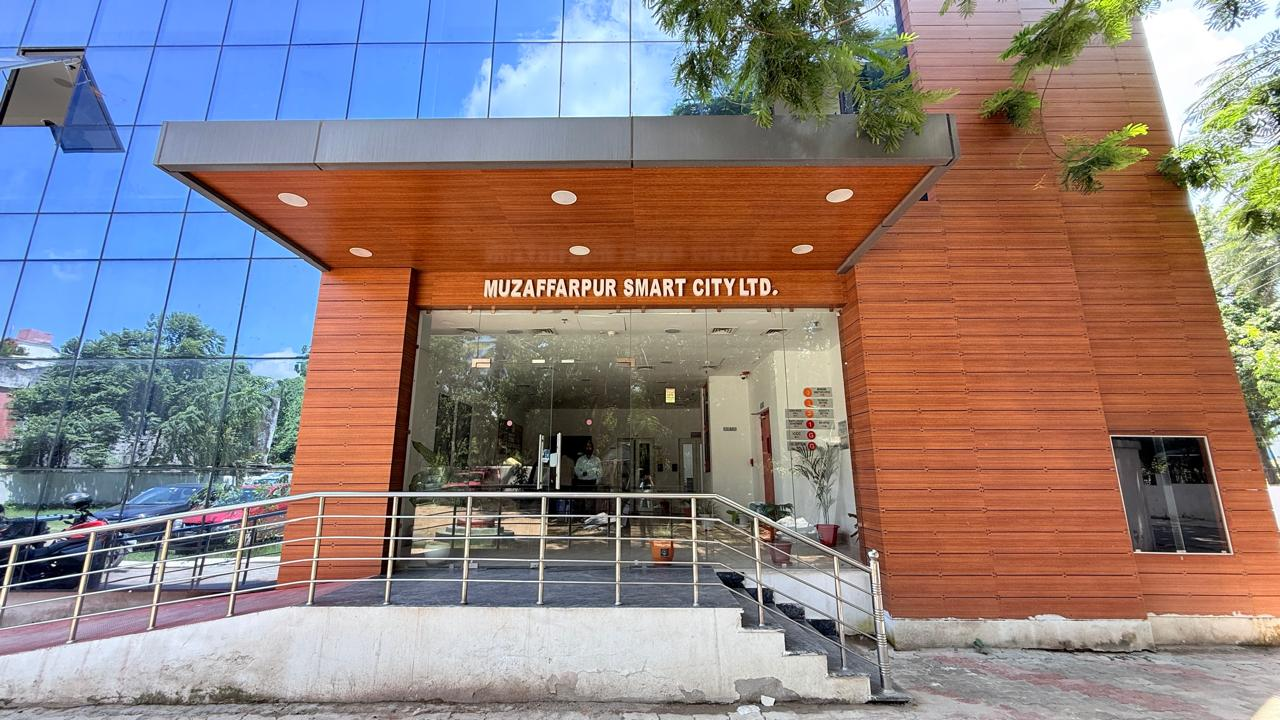
Smart City Office

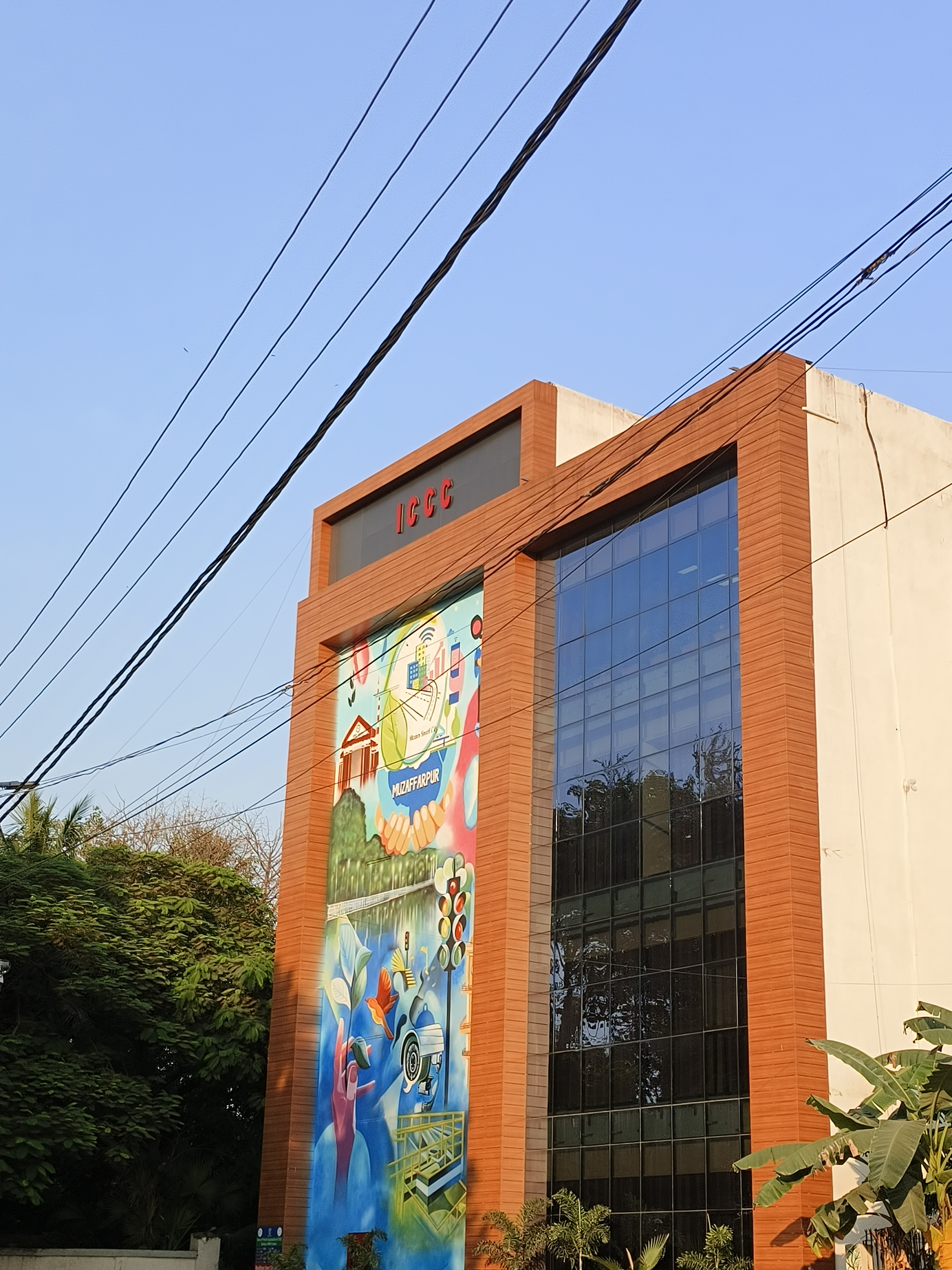
ICCC Building Muzaffarpur

== Economy ==
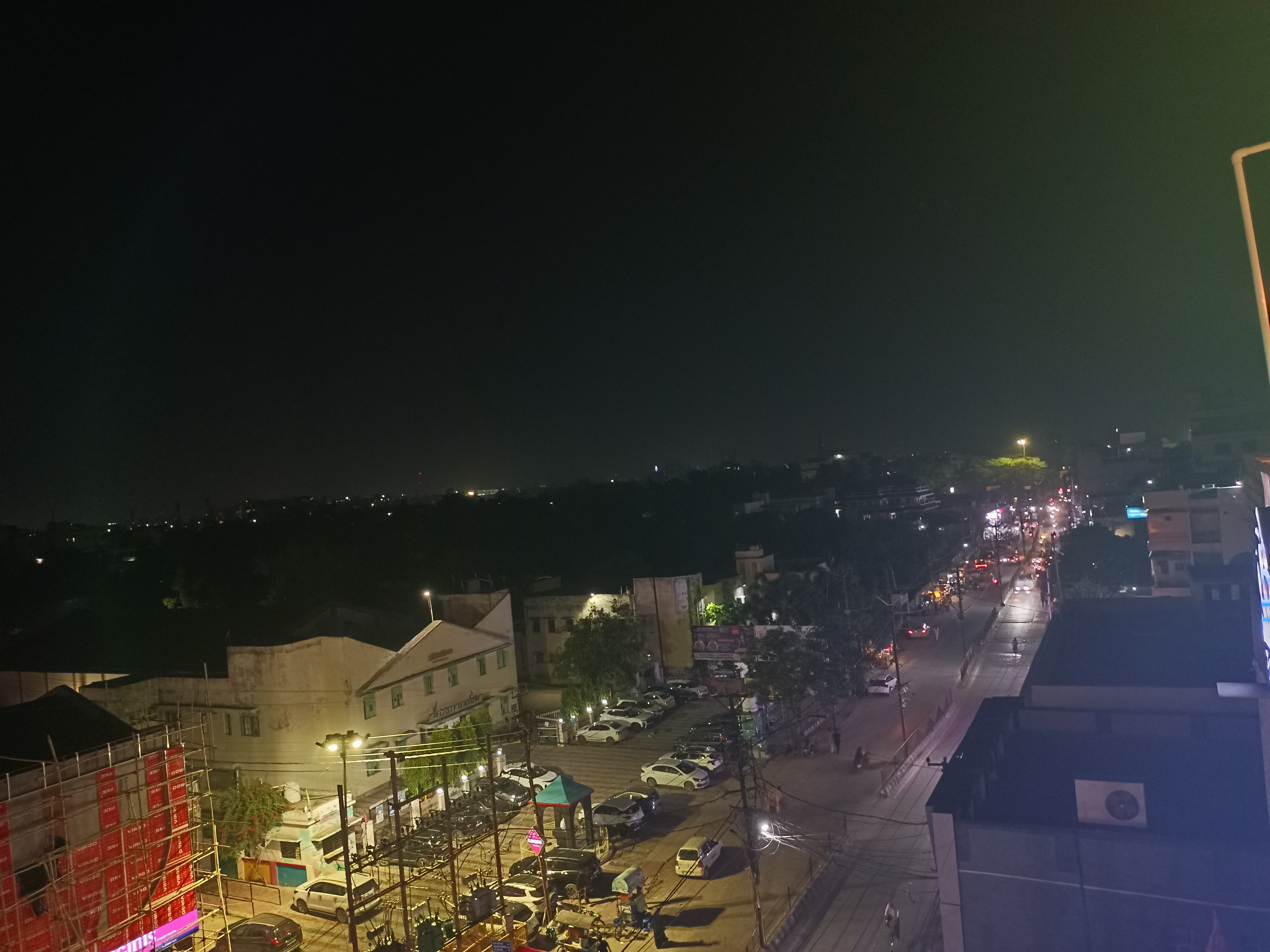
Muzaffarpur at Night in 2026

== Education ==
Notable Colleges in Muzaffarpur
Name	Type	Website
Langat Singh College	General Degree College	www.lscollege.ac.in
S.K.J. Law College	Law College	www.skjlawcollege.ac.in
RDJM Medical College & Hospital	Private Medical College	rdjmmch.in
L.N. Mishra College of Business Management	Business Management College	lnmcbm.org

Notable Schools in Muzaffarpur
Name	Affiliation/Type	Website
Sunshine Prep/High School Muzaffarpur	Private School	www.sphs.com
D.A.V. Public School, Bakhri	CBSE - Private School	davpsbakhri.in
D.A.V. Public School, Khabra	CBSE - Private School	davpskhabra.in
G.D. Mother International School	CBSE - Private School	gdmis.in
Kendriya Vidyalaya Muzaffarpur	Central Government School	muzzaffarpur.kvs.ac.in
Kendriya Vidyalaya, CRPF Camp Jhaphan	Central Government School	crpfjhaphan.kvs.ac.in
Prabhat Tara School	ICSE -Private School	www.prabhattaraschool.in
Delhi Public School, Muzaffarpur	CBSE	www.dpsmuzaffarpur.com
Shemford Futuristic School, Muzaffarpur	Private School	

== Notable people ==
Name	Description
Rambriksh Benipuri	Indian freedom movement activist, eminent writer of Hindi literature
George Fernandes	Former Defence Minister of India
Maghfoor Ahmad Ajazi	Freedom fighter and political activist
Raj Bhushan Choudhary	Indian politician, Member of 18th Lok Sabha, Member of Third Modi ministry
Devaki Nandan Khatri	Author of Chandrakanta, first modern Hindi novel
Arunabh Kumar	Founder and ex-CEO of The Viral Fever
Dinesh Prasad Singh	Indian politician, Member of Bihar Legislative Council
Veena Devi	Indian politician, Member of Lok Sabha, Vaishali (Lok Sabha constituency)
Rajendra Prasad	India's first president, worked as a professor of English in Langat Singh College
Sudhir Kumar Chaudhary	Sports spectator and fan of the Indian Cricket Team
Shreya Narayan	Bollywood actress
Aishwarya Nigam	Bollywood playback singer
Jai Narain Prasad Nishad	Indian politician and member of parliament from Muzaffarpur Lok Sabha Constituency of Bihar
Ajay Nishad	Indian politician, Member of 17th Lok Sabha
Raghunath Pandey	Famous entrepreneur who founded Shri Krishna Medical College & Hospital (SKMCH), Muzaffarpur
Jubba Sahni	Freedom fighter
Rajni Ranjan Sahu	Member Rajya Sabha, 1984–1996
Sunil Sahu	Educator in the US
Uday Shankar	Media executive and former journalist, president of FICCI, The Walt Disney Company Asia Pacific, and chairman of Star India and The Walt Disney Company India
Janki Ballabh Shastri	Hindi poet, writer and critic
Baikunth Shukla	Revolutionary hanged by the British in 1934
Yogendra Shukla	Revolutionary, Indian freedom movement activist, served time at Kalapani
Basawon Singh	Revolutionary, Indian freedom movement activist
Chandeshwar Prasad Narayan Singh	Diplomat and freedom fighter
Kishori Sinha	Indian politician and educationalist
Mridula Sinha	Former Governor of Goa (2014–2019)
Bapi Tutul	Music composer

== Climate ==
Muzaffarpur has a humid subtropical climate (Cwa) under the Köppen climate classification. The summer, between April and June, is extremely hot and humid (28–40 °C, 90% max). and winter is pleasantly cool, around 6–20 °C. Rainfall in Muzaffarpur City is comparatively less compared to other parts of Bihar.

Climate data for Muzaffarpur (1991–2020, extremes 1901–2009)
Month	Jan	Feb	Mar	Apr	May	Jun	Jul	Aug	Sep	Oct	Nov	Dec	Year
Record high °C (°F)	30.8 (87.4)	34.6 (94.3)	39.4 (102.9)	42.2 (108.0)	44.5 (112.1)	43.4 (110.1)	43.5 (110.3)	40.6 (105.1)	38.2 (100.8)	35.9 (96.6)	33.2 (91.8)	29.6 (85.3)	44.5 (112.1)
Mean daily maximum °C (°F)	21.7 (71.1)	26.1 (79.0)	31.4 (88.5)	35.8 (96.4)	35.3 (95.5)	35.0 (95.0)	33.0 (91.4)	33.1 (91.6)	32.6 (90.7)	32.0 (89.6)	28.6 (83.5)	24.1 (75.4)	30.7 (87.3)
Mean daily minimum °C (°F)	10.4 (50.7)	13.6 (56.5)	17.8 (64.0)	22.6 (72.7)	25.1 (77.2)	26.7 (80.1)	27.0 (80.6)	27.0 (80.6)	26.0 (78.8)	23.0 (73.4)	16.8 (62.2)	12.0 (53.6)	20.6 (69.1)
Record low °C (°F)	2.7 (36.9)	2.2 (36.0)	7.2 (45.0)	12.6 (54.7)	18.3 (64.9)	19.4 (66.9)	20.9 (69.6)	20.6 (69.1)	19.6 (67.3)	14.4 (57.9)	7.7 (45.9)	4.0 (39.2)	2.2 (36.0)
Average rainfall mm (inches)	10.5 (0.41)	12.5 (0.49)	7.1 (0.28)	20.9 (0.82)	74.9 (2.95)	168.6 (6.64)	270.7 (10.66)	276.5 (10.89)	192.4 (7.57)	48.5 (1.91)	3.8 (0.15)	2.8 (0.11)	1,089.2 (42.88)
Average rainy days	0.9	0.9	0.7	1.5	4.4	7.0	12.4	11.9	8.2	1.7	0.2	0.3	50.1
Average relative humidity (%) (at 17:30 IST)	79	70	57	52	63	74	82	83	83	78	76	80	73
Source: India Meteorological Department

Muzaffarpur has been ranked 32nd best "National Clean Air City" under (Category 2 3-10L Population cities) in India.

== See also ==
- Muzaffarpur district
- Tirhut division
- Garibnath Temple
- Muzaffarpur Junction
- List of cities in Bihar
- Sujini embroidery work of Bihar
- Muzaffarpur Shirsh Bihar United Football Club
